= History of France's civil nuclear program =

The history of France's civil nuclear program traces the evolution that led France to become the world's second largest producer of nuclear-generated electricity by the end of the 20th century, based on units deployed, installed capacity, and total production. Since the 1990s, nuclear energy has furnished three-fourths of France's electricity; by 2018, this portion had reached 71.7%.

At the start of the 20th century, France made significant contributions to the discovery of radioactivity and its initial uses. In the 1930s, French scientists uncovered artificial radioactivity and the mechanisms behind nuclear fission, placing the nation in a leading position within the field. However, World War II halted France's ambitions. When Germany occupied France, research relocated to the UK and subsequently to the US, where the first nuclear reactors and weapons were developed.

After World War II, France initiated an extensive nuclear program with the establishment of the Commissariat à l'Energie Atomique (CEA), but due to resource constraints, it took a considerable amount of time to achieve substantial progress. In the 1950s, the pace accelerated as France initiated a military nuclear program, which led to the creation of a deterrent force in the subsequent decade. Simultaneously, France commenced the construction of its first nuclear power plants, which were intended to produce plutonium and electricity.

In the 1970s, fueled by the oil shocks, the Pierre Messmer government decided to utilize "all-nuclear" power generation in France. This decision led to the construction of 58 standardized nuclear power reactors throughout the country for the next 25 years. Even though domestic technology was abandoned, French industrialists quickly incorporated the American technology they had chosen and exported it to South Africa, South Korea, and China. At the same time, France was developing expertise in managing the nuclear fuel cycle by constructing the largest civil reprocessing plant in the world at La Hague, as well as experimental fast-breeder reactors.

Although the anti-nuclear movement had less of an impact in France than in other European countries from the 1980s onward, radioactive waste management emerged as a crucial issue in public discourse in France.

In addition, the conclusion of the equipment phase, along with the liberalization of the electricity market, and the growing anti-nuclear movement bolstered by nuclear disasters such as Chernobyl and Fukushima, are causing changes in the French nuclear industry. Consequently, since 2015, initiatives have been made to decrease the proportion of electricity created by civil nuclear power in France, in order to accommodate renewable energy sources. Nevertheless, construction of new-generation French reactors, including the European Pressurized Reactor (EPR), persists domestically and internationally.

Research for future solutions is concentrated on Generation IV reactors and nuclear fusion. Meanwhile, shutting down reactors presents new challenges.

President Macron announced in February 2022 his plan to restart the civil nuclear program to construct six to fourteen new reactors while also expanding the lifespan of current nuclear reactors "as much as possible."

== The scientific adventure of the atom (1895-1945) ==
In just fifty years, from the initial detection of X-rays to the development of nuclear reactors and weapons, the scientific pursuit of the atom completely changed the world. France was a prominent player in the field, courtesy of the Curie family's contributions, until World War II caused a severe setback to national efforts.

=== The origins (1895-1932) ===
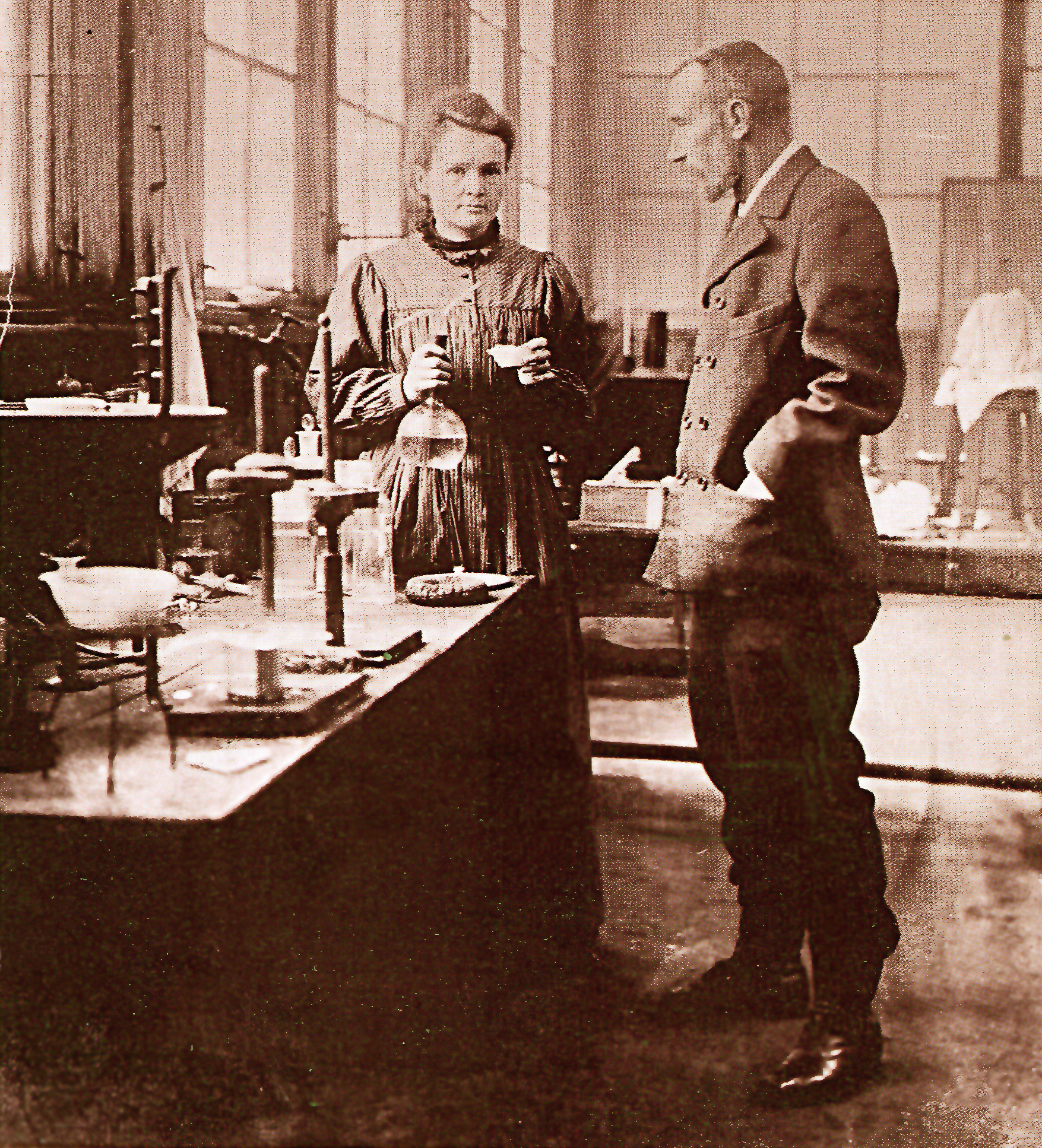
Pierre and Marie Curie in their laboratory, circa 1900.

By the end of 1895, German physicist Wilhelm Röntgen demonstrated that a cathode-ray tube produced invisible radiation capable of penetrating matter. This discovery, named "X-rays," earned him the first Nobel Prize in Physics and piqued the scientific community's interest. The next year, French physicist Henri Becquerel searched for a connection between phosphorescence and X-rays. He subsequently observed that uranium salts, also known as phosphorescent rocks, emitted radiation even if they weren't exposed to light. These emissions came to be known as Becquerel rays or uranic rays because they were believed to be unique to the element.

Pierre and Marie Curie discovered that uranic rays vary in intensity depending on the uranium ore. Starting in 1898, they aimed to isolate the element responsible for this phenomenon. By manually refining hundreds of kilograms of uraninite, they discovered the first element in July, which they named polonium in honor of Marie's homeland. In December, they found a second, even more reactive element: radium. Additionally, they co-discovered the activity of thorium. The Curies were awarded the Nobel Prize in Physics in 1903, jointly with Henri Becquerel, for their discovery of natural radioactivity. In 1911, Marie Curie was presented with the Nobel Prize in Chemistry for her isolation of radium and polonium.

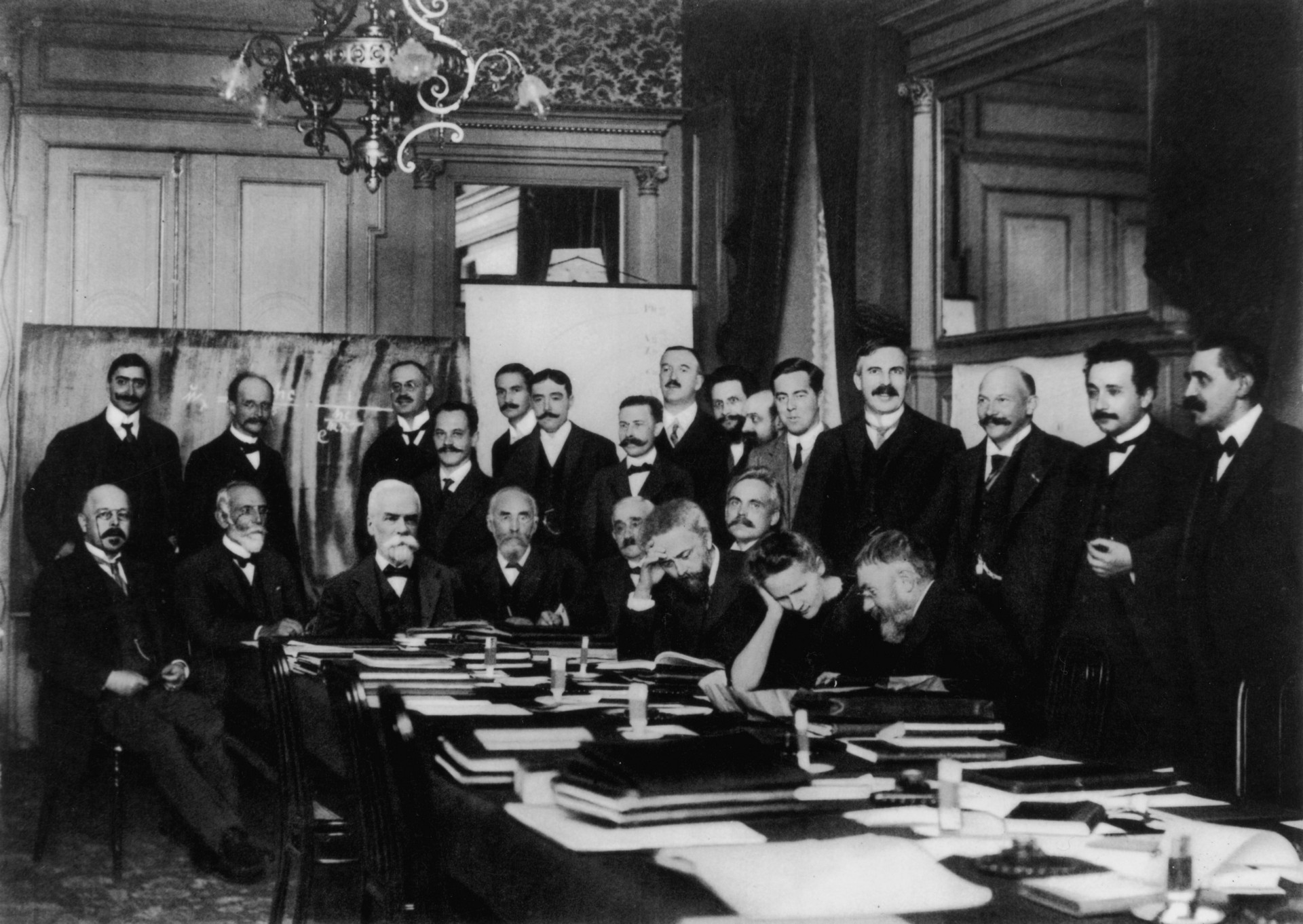
Participants at the first Solvay Conference in 1911, including Marie Curie, Ernest Rutherford, Max Planck and Albert Einstein.

In 1899, New Zealand-born physicist Ernest Rutherford discovered two types of radiation, alpha and beta rays, which were less penetrating than X-rays. In 1903, he linked these rays to the Curies' discoveries and proposed a hypothesis that the radioactive elements in uranium and thorium were linked together, with the heavier element spontaneously losing its substance through decay to give rise to a lighter element and so forth. In 1911, Rutherford suggested a novel depiction of the atom's structure subsequent to a well-known experiment: a nucleus that bears positively-charged particles attracting negative charges, namely electrons. Niels Bohr, a Danish physicist, modified Rutherford's model using Max Planck's initiated quantum theory and showed that electrons do not collapse towards the nucleus due to attraction, and rather remain at a specific level, which is also known as Bohr's model. Finally, in 1919, Rutherford demonstrated that the hydrogen atom's nucleus was present in all other nuclei and labeled it the proton. He also hypothesized the presence of neutral, uncharged particles in the nucleus, alongside protons.

In 1930, the Germans Walther Bothe and Herbert Becker noticed that when alpha rays bombarded lithium, beryllium, and boron, these elements emitted "ultra-penetrating" rays. Intrigued by these findings, Irène Curie, the daughter of Pierre and Marie Curie, and her husband Frédéric Joliot, embarked on a mission to comprehend the radiation's nature. They found that it could set protons in motion in January 1932. Following this discovery, James Chadwick, an Englishman and a former disciple of Rutherford, uncovered the last piece of the atomic puzzle: neutrons, the following month.

=== Discovery of nuclear energy (1933-1939) ===
"We have every right to believe that researchers, breaking or building elements at will, may find the means to achieve veritable transmutations of an explosive nature, genuine chemical chain reactions."

— Frédéric Joliot-Curie, Official acceptance speech for the Nobel Prize in Chemistry, December 12, 1935.

Nuclear physics was born from the work of Frédéric Joliot and Irène Curie. In late 1933, they used alpha radiation to bombard aluminum foil and demonstrated the production of radioactive phosphorus-30, a phosphorus isotope. They concluded that irradiation could produce new radioactive elements. From the outset, they anticipated numerous applications in medicine, particularly with radioactive tracers. For their groundbreaking discovery, they were honored with the 1935 Nobel Prize in Chemistry.

In 1934, Enrico Fermi of Italy found that slowed-down neutrons (such as those that have passed through kerosene) were more efficient than regular ones, leading to the necessity for the use of "moderating" materials like heavy water in future facilities. Numerous European research laboratories were subjecting nuclei to bombardment for analysis of their effects. In December 1938, two German exiles residing in Sweden, Lise Meitner and Otto Frisch, discovered a crucial explanation for nuclear energy: the phenomenon of fission. In February 1939, Niels Bohr confirmed that inside natural uranium, there exist two isotopes; ^{238}U and ^{235}U. However, only uranium 235 is "fissile". Although it is the rarer of the two, accounting for only 0.72% of uranium, enriching uranium ore is necessary to increase the proportion of fissile material and obtain a more reactive fuel.

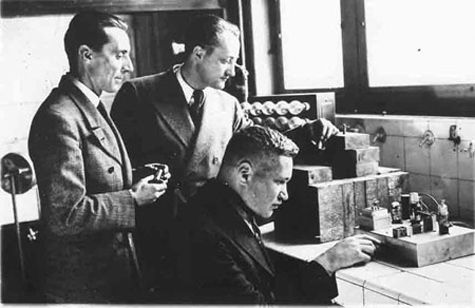
Frédéric Joliot, Hans von Halban and Lew Kowarski in the laboratory in 1933.

Finally, in April 1939, French physicists Frédéric Joliot-Curie, Hans von Halban, Lew Kowarski, and Francis Perrin (Note: Hans von Halban, Lew Kowarski and Francis Perrin were then employed by the Collège de France as part of a team headed by Frédéric Joliot.) published an article in the journal Nature. The article demonstrated that uranium nucleus fission accompanies the emission of 3.5 neutrons (later corrected to 2.4), which can subsequently fragment other nuclei resulting in a "chain reaction" phenomenon. This fundamental finding in nuclear physics was published shortly before their American competitors.

In May 1939, four French individuals filed three patents. The initial two patents concerned uranium energy production, and the third one, a confidential patent, was for improving explosive charges. Joliot, who strongly believed in the future significance of atomic energy, met Minister of Armament Raoul Dautry in the fall of the same year. Dautry provided full support for the development of explosives and the production of energy.

July 1939 saw the start of experiments at the Collège de France laboratory on the release of energy through chain reactions, which continued at the Atomic Synthesis Laboratory. (Note: In Ivry-sur-Seine, the Front Populaire founds an Atomic Synthesis Laboratory under the aegis of the Caisse Nationale pour la Recherche Scientifique, which has acquired the Ampère laboratory from the Compagnie Générale Électro-Céramique.) To safeguard his patents, Joliot established an industrial network around him, primarily via an agreement between CNRS and Union minière du Haut-Katanga, who owned the uranium in Belgian Congo.

In the fall of 1939, the Joliot team recognized that France lacked the capability to enrich natural uranium to its fissile isotope (^{235}U). As a result, they opted to employ heavy water to construct an atomic reactor. Following the request of the Collège de France in February 1940, Raoul Dautry dispatched Jacques Allier on a clandestine expedition to Norway to reclaim the complete inventory of heavy water held by Norsk Hydro, a partially French-owned corporation, which Germany also coveted.

=== Suspension of research in France (1940-1945) ===
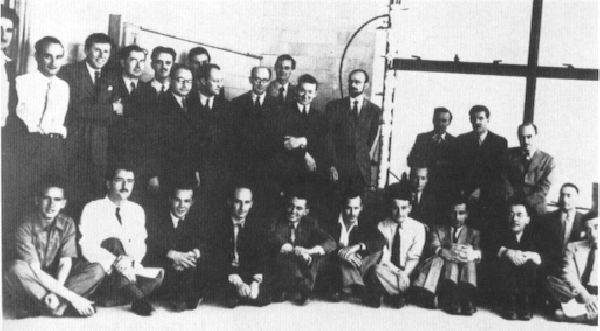
Researchers at the Montreal Laboratory in 1944, including Frenchmen Hans Halban, Pierre Auger and Bertrand Goldschmidt.

Germany's invasion of France in May 1940 halted work. In early June, the laboratory quickly relocated from Paris to Clermont-Ferrand, but the war was already lost. On June 18, 1940, as General de Gaulle launched his renowned appeal on London radio, Hans Halban and Lew Kowarski departed from Bordeaux to the United Kingdom with the heavy water stockreactor. The uranium stockreactor was concealed in Morocco and France. Joliot opted to remain in his position at the Collège de France and care for his unwell wife, instead of leaving. During a challenging period, German physicists arrived at his lab to examine the Collège de France cyclotron. After extensive questioning, Joliot-Curie agreed to work alongside the German physicists, headed by Wolfgang Gentner whom he had previously studied with at the Curie laboratory, to ensure his laboratory's continuation. In 1941–1942, he enlisted with the National Front for the Liberation and Independence of France, also known as the Front National de Lutte pour la Libération et l'Indépendance de la France, an underground resistance movement established by the French Communist Party. He went into hiding in April 1944.

The members of the Collège de France who were exiled deliver French secrets to the Allies, primarily to the British who were spearheading an atomic bomb project through the MAUD Committee. However, the US nuclear program excluded them (except for Bertrand Goldschmidt) for economic (pertaining to the three patents) and political reasons (due to the distrust of de Gaulle and Joliot). Isolated at the Cavendish lab in Cambridge and later at the Montreal lab starting from the end of 1942, they contributed to the work conducted by an Anglo-Canadian team. Louis Rapkine directed the establishment of a scientific office for the Delegation of Free France in New York shortly after the US joined the war in December 1941. This office facilitated the integration of French scientists in exile, including Pierre Auger and Jules Guéron, into the Anglo-Canadian project led by Halban, as they declined to acquire American citizenship and work with the American teams. This office facilitated the integration of French scientists in exile, including Pierre Auger and Jules Guéron, into the Anglo-Canadian project led by Halban, as they declined to acquire American citizenship and work with the American teams. Their amassed knowledge proved pivotal in revitalizing French research in this domain.

On July 11, 1944, Pierre Auger, Jules Guéron, and Bertrand Goldschmidt confidentially informed General de Gaulle, who was visiting Ottawa (Canada), about the United States' Manhattan Project. Shortly after the liberation of Paris in August 1944, the initial batch of French scientists, which included Auger, came back from Montreal. In April 1945, the German atomic scientists' towns were captured by the 1st French Army, while Operation Alsos raided the labs, including the Haigerloch atomic reactor, apprehended the Reich scientists, and only left behind a handful of technicians. The French nuclear program had to go it alone, having been ostracized by the Anglo-Saxons, deprived of uranium sources, and given meagre war prizes.

== The birth of a nuclear program (1945-1952) ==
In March 1945, during the ongoing war, Raoul Dautry (Minister of Reconstruction and Urban Planning in the Provisional Government) informed General de Gaulle (President of the Provisional Government) of the benefits of nuclear power for reconstruction efforts. The atomic bombings of Hiroshima and Nagasaki on August 6 and 9, 1945, revealed the advancements made by American research in this area to the global audience. On August 31, de Gaulle tasked Raoul Dautry and Frédéric Joliot (Director of the National Center for Scientific Research) with proposing an organization that could unify research to restore France's position in the global atomic science field.

=== Creation of the French Alternative Energies and Atomic Energy Commission (CEA) ===
" Unfortunately, it was through the shattering explosion of Hiroshima that this new conquest of Science was revealed to us. Despite this terrifying apparition, I am convinced that this conquest will bring mankind more good than harm."

— Frédéric Joliot-Curie, Speech to the French National Academy of Medicine, December 18, 1945.

The French Atomic Energy Commission (CEA) was established by General de Gaulle on October 18, 1945. Its objective was to "conduct research on scientific and technical aspects of atomic energy usage in multiple areas, including industry, science, and national defense". Reporting directly to the president of the French Council, CEA was responsible for managing atomic energy starting from uranium prospecting to constructing power reactors. To meet the demands of both scientists and politicians, the CEA was jointly organized by Joliot, serving as High Commissioner for Atomic Energy, and Dautry, the government's Deputy Director General.

As Joliot, a member of the French Communist Party, exerted his influence, opposition to the military application of atomic energy gained traction across the CEA. As the high commissioner, he advocated for France to take a stance against military nuclear power through a global ban on atomic weapon production and to prioritize the development of large-scale power reactors. Given France's neutral position between the two superpowers and the military's requirement for resources to manage decolonization, Ambassador Alexandre Parodi reinforced this political position on June 25, 1946, during the first UN Atomic Energy Commission hearing. It became the official stance of the Fourth Republic, allowing it to hide its vulnerabilities and later its classified information.

Despite the Quebec Agreement signed between the United States and the United Kingdom in August 1943, which prohibited the disclosure of their nuclear research, the British permitted the remaining French scientists to return home with a few notes as a gesture of gratitude to France. In 1946, "Canadians" Lew Kowarski, Jules Guéron, and Bertrand Goldschmidt were integrated into the CEA, with their valuable notes forming the foundation of French nuclear knowledge and enabling the CEA to train the first generation of atomic scientists, both civilian and military. On March 8, 1946, the CEA settled into the Fort de Châtillon in Fontenay-aux-Roses, located in the southwest of Paris. The initial plan proposed the immediate execution of two fuel cells, one utilizing heavy water, and the other graphite, and the establishment of a 100-megawatt (MWe) nuclear power plant within a decade.

=== The uranium rush ===
In order to carry out the CEA's program independently, France required uranium from sources it could control. Exploration permits were not granted in the French colonies as early as the summer of 1945. The pre-war reserve, brought back from Morocco discreetly, only met the requirements for constructing an initial cell. However, the existence of uranium ores in French territory in the Morvan region and Madagascar was verified in the 19th century. Starting in March 1946, trained prospecting commandos began their search at the Laboratoire de Minéralogie of the National Museum of Natural History.

The first CEA prospectors, former maquisards, scoured the area equipped with Geiger counters. Within two years, the CEA's Direction des Recherches et Exploitations Minières (DREM) workforce grew from 10 to nearly 300 employees. Eventually, in November 1948, the first uranium deposit was discovered at Saint-Sylvestre, located in the Limousin region. The La Crouzille deposit commenced production on July 10, 1950, and was succeeded by numerous others in Vendée (1951), Brittany, Auvergne (1954), and Languedoc (1957). These deposits were operated by either the CEA or private firms. Within a decade, France emerged as the leading producer of uranium in Europe, with a total of 217 active mines up to 2001.

Research conducted outside of mainland France, such as in Madagascar and Ivory Coast (1946), Morocco (1947), French Congo (1948), and Algeria and Cameroon (1950), proved inconclusive. To encourage prospecting in the colonies, the CEA abolished its research monopoly in 1954. Aerial prospecting eased the task, particularly over the Sahara. The first significant deposit was found in 1956 at Mounana in Gabon. The largest reserve, at Arlit and Imouraren in Niger, was discovered in 1965. Prospecting even expanded beyond French possessions, including Western Canada's Cluff Lake in 1968. These deposits, France's primary sources of supply, became foreign with decolonization but remained under the control of the CEA. This would contribute to the success of its successor, Compagnie Générale des Matières Nucléaires (Cogema), making it the top producer of natural uranium in the Western bloc by 1980.

=== Zoé, France's first atomic cell ===
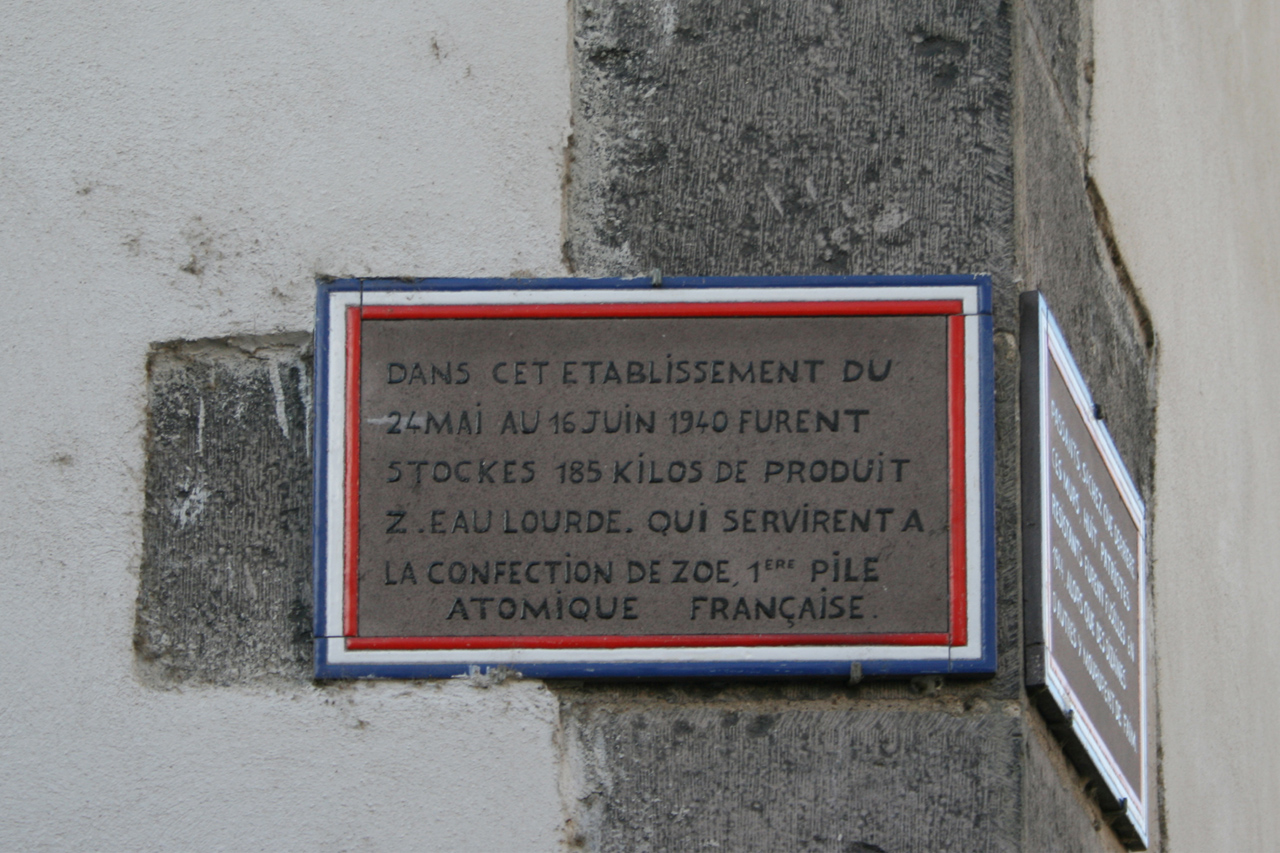
Commemorative plaque at the fuel storage site for Zoé, France's first atomic fuel cell.

The French Atomic Energy Commission (CEA) established a facility in a section of the Bouchet powder mine near Ballancourt-sur-Essonne in January 1948 to purify uranium ore into pure oxide. However, the conversion of this substance into uranium metal posed challenges, resulting in a postponed reactor construction. To meet the public and politicians' demands swiftly and secure the necessary CEA subsidies, a decision was made to construct a small reactor using natural uranium oxide as fuel, despite its limited technical value.

As the French-produced graphite remained too impure for use as a moderator, Kowarski, who drew upon his knowledge from building the Canadian ZEEP heavy-water atomic reactor, was tasked with constructing a comparable reactor. The first French atomic reactor began operating on December 15, 1948, with a process called "diverge". The Obninsk Nuclear Power Plant still remained a secret, but EL1 or "Zoé" was the first operational atomic reactor outside of an Anglo-Saxon nation and a source of national pride. Despite producing only a few kilowatts, it aided in gaining a deeper comprehension of nuclear reactions in physics studies as well as the production of radioisotopes for research and industry.

On November 20, 1949, Goldschmidt and his colleagues in Canada developed a process that enabled the isolation of the first four milligrams of plutonium from irradiated fuel and its removal from the Zoé fuel cell. This event was a significant milestone since the synthetic element was essential for designing the first atomic bomb. The construction of the Saclay center south of Paris also started in the same year, as the Châtillon fort became overcrowded. The center was designed by Auguste Perret. In 1952, the Van de Graaff accelerator was commissioned at the same site where the second heavy water reactor (EL2) became operational. This new accelerator was more powerful, utilizing uranium metal and cooled by gas. Its purposes included conducting physics and metallurgy experiments and producing artificial radioisotopes in greater quantities.

Following the Prague coup and Berlin blockade, the Soviet Union detonated its first atomic bomb, marking the start of the Cold War. Frédéric Joliot intentionally launched the Stockholm Appeal on March 19, 1950. However, he overstepped his bounds the next month when he stated: "Progressive and Communist scientists will never contribute their knowledge to wage war against the Soviet Union". (Note: Statement by Frédéric Joliot-Curie in Gennevilliers at the XIIth Congress of the French Communist Party, April 5, 1950.) As a result, he was promptly dismissed from his position. Raoul Dautry capitalized on the opportunity to restructure the CEA. The following year, he selected Francis Perrin as its new leader, who had not supported the appeal. Dautry died on August 21, 1951. On November 8, he was succeeded by Pierre Guillaumat, a Companion of the Liberation. Guillaumat eliminated communist scientists and steered the CEA in a fresh military-industrial direction.

== The deployment of the nuclear program (1952-1969) ==
As the CEA lacked the necessary technical and financial resources to enrich natural uranium to its fissile isotope (^{235}U), it was incapable of manufacturing nuclear weapons or developing light-water reactors. While heavy-water reactor technology represented one viable solution, the production of this nuclear fuel was a costly endeavor. Therefore, France opted to follow the footsteps of the UK in turning to graphite atomic cell technology to address this challenge. This nuclear technology utilized natural uranium as fuel, graphite as a neutron moderator, and gas as a coolant to cool the core and extract heat to a water-steam circuit that drove the turbo-alternator. The first three components could provide France with the means to build the bomb, whereas the next three could propel the country into the nuclear power industry.

=== Plutonigenic reactors ===
"Making gold is little compared to what modern alchemy has achieved in making plutonium, which is worth much more than gold and will become the source of the country's wealth and power sooner than gold."

— Félix Gaillard, Secretary of State for Finance, July 3, 1952.

The National Assembly approved the initial nuclear energy plan for a five-year term on July 24, 1952. The plan sought to build two experimental reactors at the Marcoule nuclear site, and construction began in 1955. Shortly thereafter, the construction of a third reactor commenced. In addition to generating electricity, these reactors would produce plutonium in sufficient quantities to support a civil advanced reactor program and potentially a military one, at a cost three times lower than highly enriched uranium.

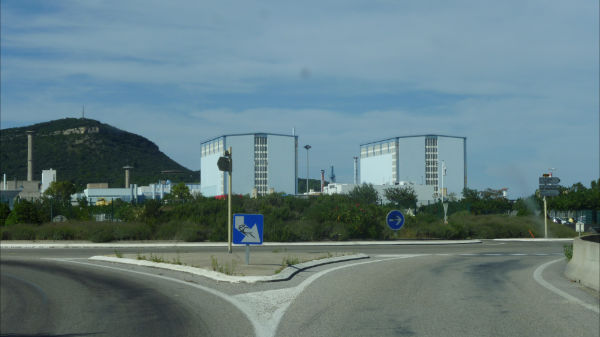
G2 and G3 reactors at the Marcoule nuclear site. Commissioned in 1958 and 1959.

The G1 reactor, a prototypical unit optimized for plutonium production, diverged on January 7, 1956, producing 40 MWt of energy. The G1 reactor, a prototypical unit optimized for plutonium production, diverged on January 7, 1956, producing 40 MWt of energy. However, it consumed more electrical energy than it generated. This launch marked the start of collaboration between CEA and the industry, supported by an agreement with Électricité de France (EDF) for electricity production, starting on September 28, with a capacity of 2 MWe. The G2 and G3 reactors, commissioned in 1958 and 1959 respectively, utilized pressurized carbon dioxide for cooling and were significantly more powerful (150 MWt, 40 MWe) than previous models. These reactors were poised to set the benchmark in the power generation industry. A reprocessing plant (UP1) was also commissioned in 1958 to extract plutonium from spent fuel.

On the military side, the decision to develop an atomic bomb was made by the Pierre Mendès France government at the end of 1954, but only became official after Charles de Gaulle's inauguration as President of the Council on June 1, 1958. During the initial Defense Council on June 17, de Gaulle terminated the military nuclear collaboration project established among France, Germany, and Italy in 1955, and hastened the national program by confirming the schedule of France's inaugural military test. Nuclear control and possessing atomic weapons as a deterrent formed the basis of De Gaulle's policy of national independence. It was applied in both the military and energy sectors. France detonated its first atomic bomb, the "Gerboise bleue" as planned on February 13, 1960, at the Reggane testing site in Algeria.

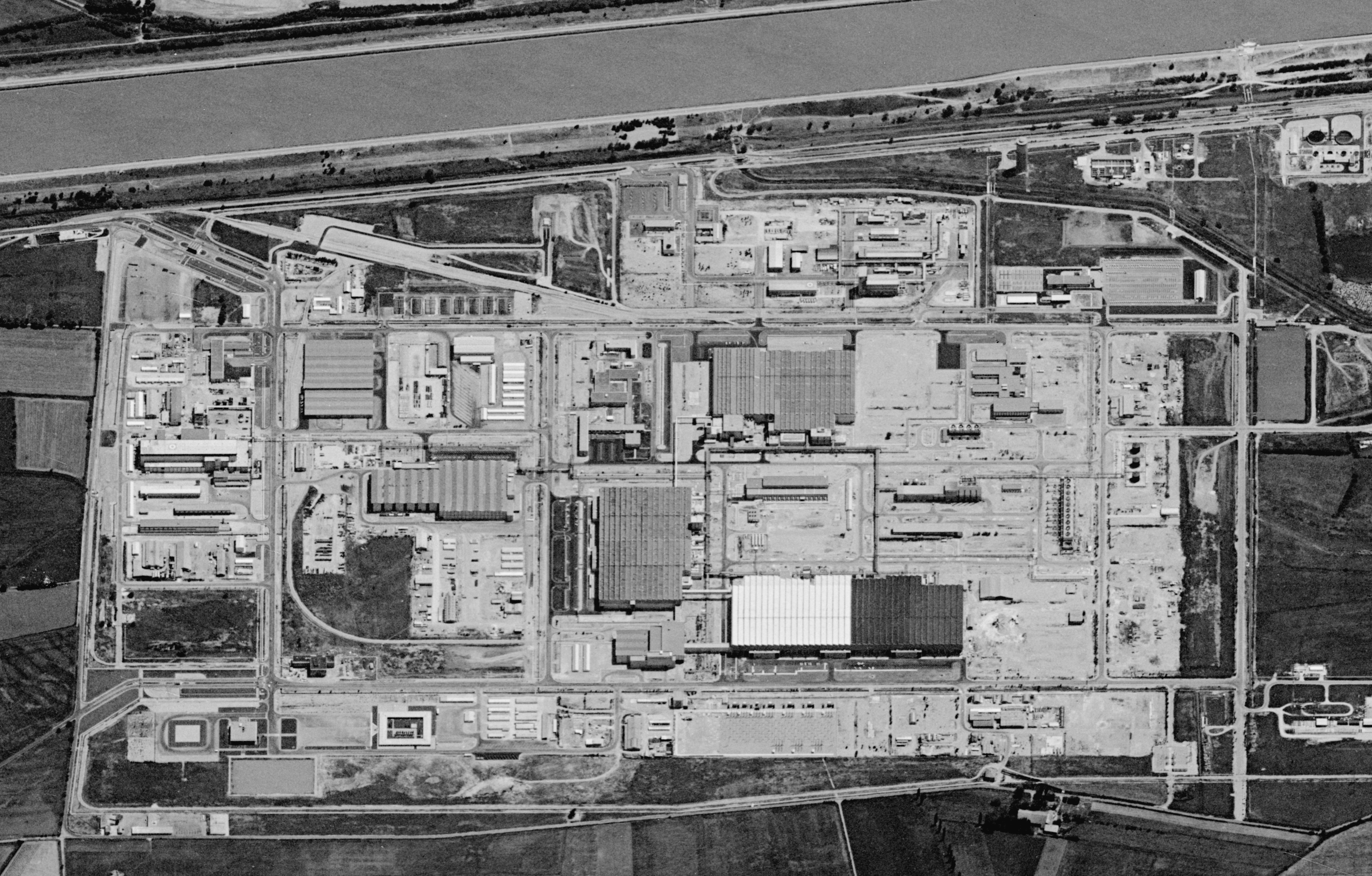
The Pierrelatte military plant, photographed by an American reconnaissance satellite in 1967.

In July 1957, Saclay inaugurated its third heavy water reactor (EL3) that utilized enriched uranium supplied by the United States, which had relaxed its non-proliferation policy since the Atomic Energy Act of 1954. Nonetheless, becoming self-sufficient in producing fuel was crucial to mastering the entire nuclear cycle for both military and civilian purposes. Therefore, Saclay began operating a pilot plant for uranium enrichment by gaseous diffusion (PS1) in April 1958. After the plan for a Franco-British and then European plant was scrapped due to national independence, construction began on a military uranium enrichment facility at the end of 1958. The selected process required substantial electricity, so the industrial complex was erected near the Donzère-Mondragon dam in Pierrelatte. The enrichment cascades, which were commissioned from 1964 to 1967, generated highly enriched uranium (20% or more isotope 235) for thermonuclear weapons.

=== Generating reactors ===
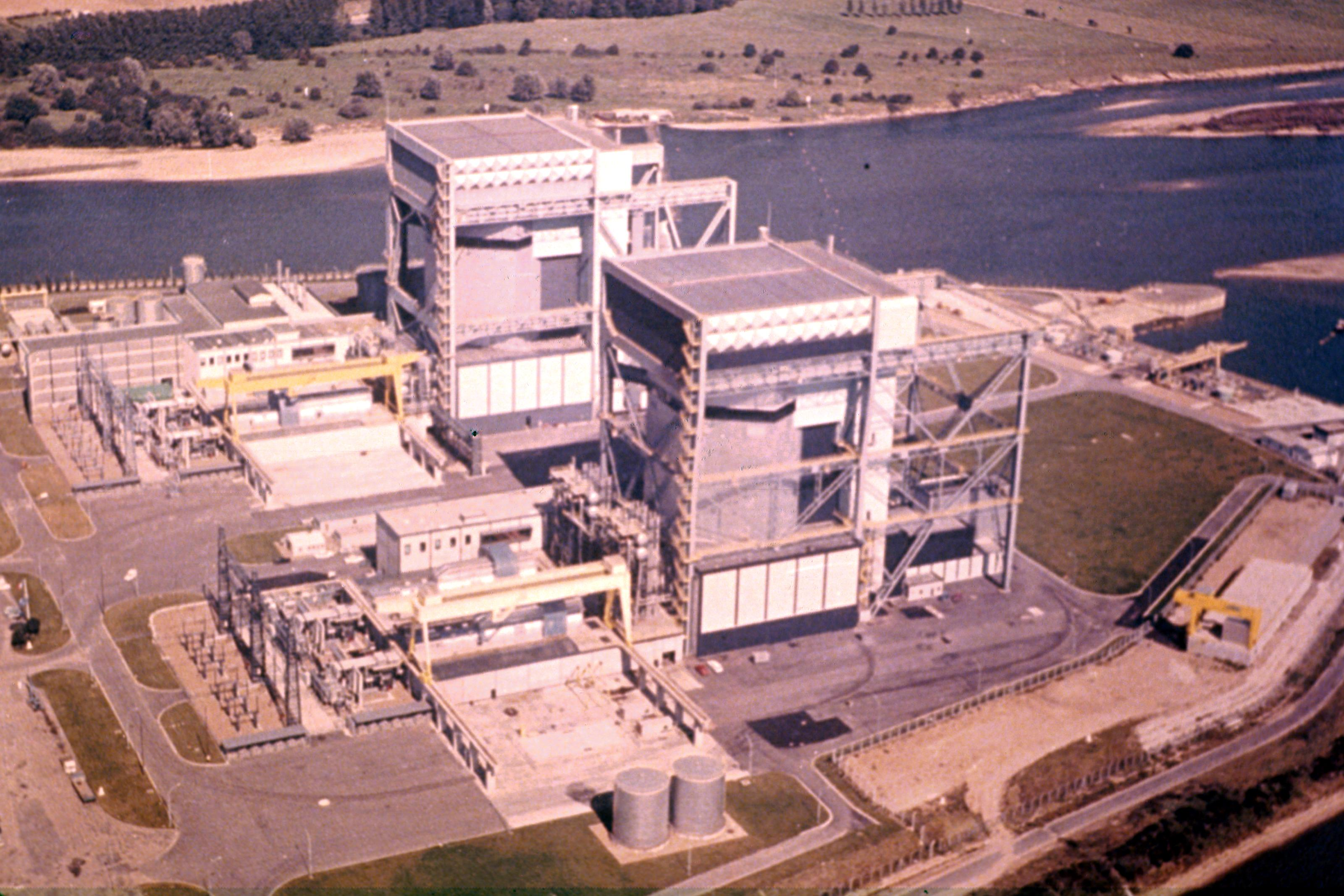
EDF4 and EDF5 UNGG reactors at the Saint-Laurent-des-Eaux nuclear power plant. Commissioned in 1969 and 1971.

Following the success of the experimental reactors at Marcoule, EDF was tasked with establishing the French nuclear power program using the same type of reactors, Uranium naturel graphite gaz (UNGG). In order to quickly achieve competitiveness, the state-owned company launched reactors of increasing power, learning from the construction of previous models without waiting for their commissioning. To minimize expenses, a series of prototypes were constructed: three at the Chinon location (EDF1, EDF2, and EDF3), followed by two at Saint-Laurent-des-Eaux (EDF4 and EDF5). The most recent prototype, situated at Bugey, aimed to begin a set of six identical power plants that pave the path towards 1,000 MWe of energy using new fuel varieties.

However, as the development of Bugey-1 progressed, it became clear that the UNGG technology had its limitations. Between 1957 and 1965, the unit power output increased from 70 MWe (EDF1) to 540 MWe (Bugey-1). However, any further increase would make the reactor difficult to control. To compete with domestic thermal power stations and the American light-water reactors that our European neighbors are adopting, increasing the power output and reducing the cost per kilowatt-hour (kWh) produced is the only way. Failing this, no new UNGGs were built, and only one was exported to Vandellòs, Spain. By the end of the decade, graphite-gas nuclear power only supplied 5% of the electricity generated in France. The future of this energy source was even more uncertain as oil prices hit rock bottom.

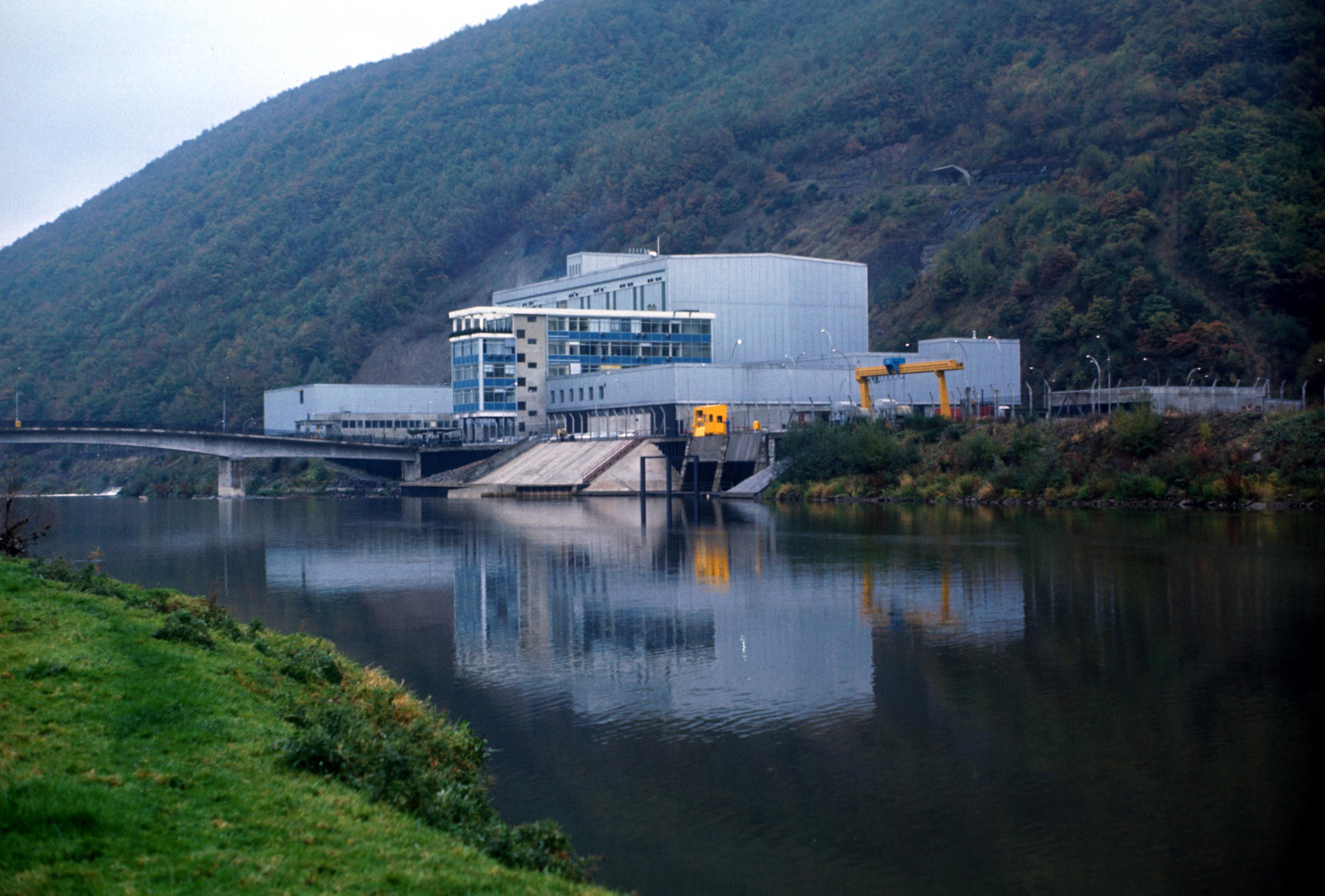
The Franco-Belgian Chooz A reactor, partly buried under a hill, was France's first civil PWR, commissioned in 1967.

Meanwhile, EDF was exploring other technologies alongside the French UNGG line.

- In 1966, French and Belgian electricians collaborated under the Euratom framework to construct an American pressurized water reactor (PWR) near the border of Belgium and France, which served as the prototype of the Ardennes power plant (later renamed Chooz A). This was not Belgium's initial endeavor toward such a facility, as they had previously hosted the first American PWR in Europe (BR-3) located in Mol in 1962.
- There was also a plan with Switzerland to construct another boiling water reactor (BWR) in Kaiseraugst, but it was eventually abandoned due to several postponements.

The CEA, which trusted its UNGG's, decided to do the same, but with the intention of preparing to build the UNGG itself:

- By participating in a British high-temperature gas reactor prototype (Dragon) in 1964.
- Building an experimental reactor moderated by heavy water and cooled with carbon dioxide (EL4) at Brennilis in 1966;
- Then, a fast neutron reactor (Rapsodie) was built in 1967. The latter served as the precursor to Phénix and Superphénix.

=== Research reactors ===
The Cadarache center, located near Manosque, was created in 1960 to house Rapsodie and to study nuclear propulsion for ships. It became the fifth nuclear research facility not reserved for military purposes, following Fort de Châtillon, Saclay, Marcoule, and Grenoble. Throughout the 1960s, each center had an average of two research reactors built, totaling ten. Minerve (1959), Marius (1960), Peggy (1961), César (1964), Éole (1965), and Isis (1966) were models critical for neutronic calculations on the fuel networks of various nuclear reactors. Cabri (1963) researched "power excursions", while Pégase (1963) and Osiris (1966) focused on materials and fuels for nuclear power plants. Osiris also manufactured doped silicon and radioelements for industrial and medical purposes, including technetium-99m, of which it is among the world's three exclusive producers. Harmonie (1965) and Masurca (1966) conducted experiments on overgeneration. The High Flux Reactor (RHF), the world's most powerful neutron source, facilitated essential materials research beginning in 1971. Phébus and Orphée were added in 1978 and 1980, respectively, to simulate accidents that could impact PWRs and to support the RHF.

== The industrial turning point (1969-1983) ==
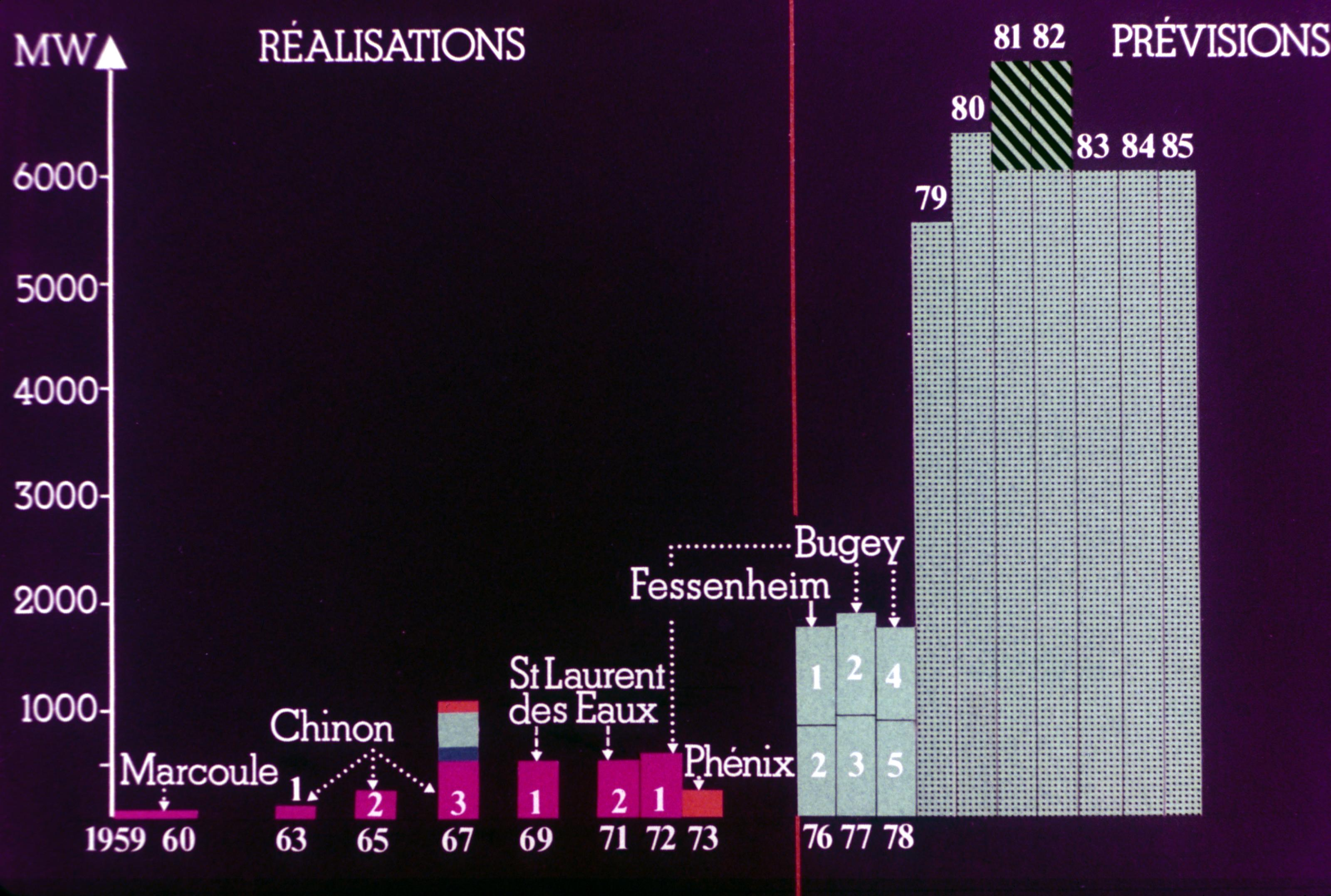
Forecast schedule for nuclear power in France from 1959 to 1985.

In the early 1960s, the Commission pour la production d'électricité d'origine nucléaire (Péon Commission), which was established in 1955 to evaluate the expenses of constructing nuclear reactors, recommended the advancement of nuclear energy to address the insufficiency of domestic energy resources. Two contrasting positions emerged: that of the CEA, which supported the national dual-purpose UNGG reactor (civil and military (Note: With the abandonment of the UNGG option, the CEA proposed developing a French PWR based on the PAT naval reactor and then upgrading the American option to free it from the limitations imposed by the Westinghouse license. Neither of these solutions was adopted, as the time required to develop them would have kept France out of the export market for too long.)), and that of EDF, which advocated for the development of a more competitive "American" reactor (enriched uranium and light water). In January 1967, (Note: Horowitz-Cabanius report, named after the directors of CEA and EDF respectively.) a technical report jointly produced by the CEA and EDF found that the cost of producing kWh from a UNGG reactor was almost 20% higher than that of a pressurized water reactor (PWR) with the same power (500 MWe). However, in December, General de Gaulle authorized the construction of two UNGG reactors in Fessenheim, Haut-Rhin region while concurrently collaborating with Belgium on PWRs to maintain national independence. This cooperation resulted in the Tihange Nuclear Power Station in 1975 after Chooz. Part of a successful technology transfer, this 950 MWe plant was entirely designed by French and Belgian design offices, making it exceedingly powerful for its time, which enabled both countries to dominate the industry.

=== Abandonment of the UNGG process ===
"To continue, in France, within our small borders, to pursue a technique in which the world is not interested, makes no sense today."

— Marcel Boiteux, CEO of EDF., Inauguration of the EDF4 reactor, October 16, 1969.

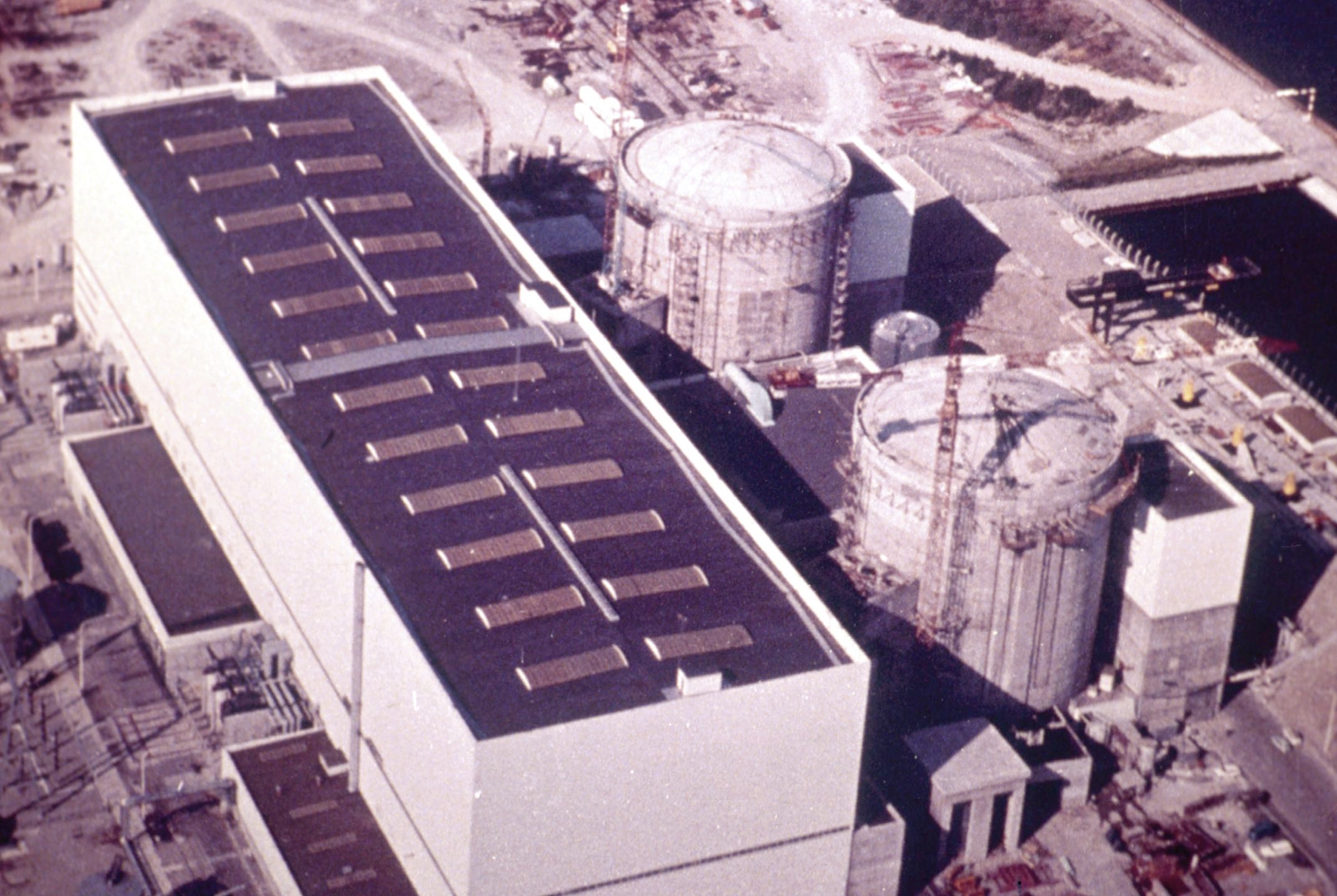
The Fessenheim Nuclear Power Plant under construction. The first two CP0 PWRs.

The equipment bidding process for UNGGs at Fessenheim was a disaster, as every manufacturer submitted an overpriced offer to mitigate its own risk. On November 15, 1968, the Energy Commission proposed selecting a provider based on economic criteria, leading de Gaulle to concede to the inevitable outcome. However, the responsibility to officially abandon the national line in favor of light-water reactors fell on his newly elected successor, Georges Pompidou, and the Jacques Chaban-Delmas government. They made an interministerial decision on November 13, 1969, citing two arguments: the simplicity and safety of these reactors, and the technical and financial proficiency of the American companies promoting them. The setback faced by Britain with AGR and the partial core meltdown that took place in reactor A1 at the Saint-Laurent-des-Eaux power plant, a month prior, also played a significant role in the decision made by public authorities.

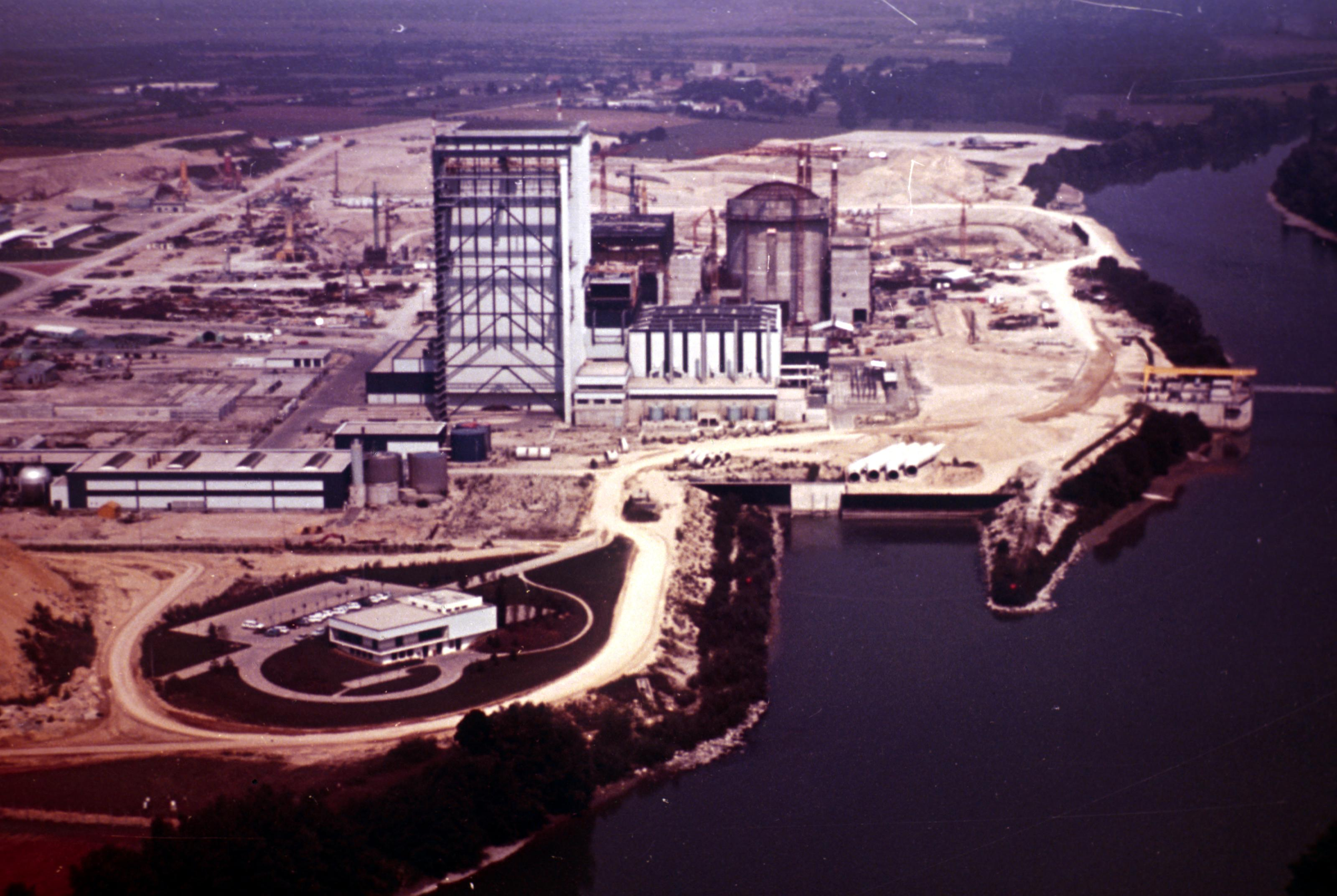
The first two PWR units of the Bugey power plant (CP0), under construction behind the UNGG reactor.

The Péon Commission proposed that four or five light-water reactors be put into operation by 1976, since purchasing uranium, including enriched uranium from the United States, would be less expensive than importing oil. Two companies, Framatome and Compagnie Générale d'Electricité (CGE), competed to supply EDF with their "nuclear boilers." Framatome (Note: Framatome (Société franco-américaine de constructions atomiques), a subsidiary of Creusot-Loire, was created in 1958 to build the Ardennes power plant (Chooz A), France's first PWR.) used Westinghouse's patent for pressurized water reactor (PWR) (Note: Framatome had acquired the Westinghouse license for $1 million ($8.7 million in 2018 dollars) and had to pay 1% of the construction price of its power plants to the American company until 1973.) technology, while CGE used General Electric's patent for boiling water reactor (BWR) technology. For turbo-alternators, Alsthom's technology - a subsidiary of CGE - competes against Compagnie Électro-Mécanique's technology, a subsidiary controlled by the Swiss company Brown, Boveri & Cie (BBC).

This decision was made after a new call for tenders as Framatome's proposal was more cost-effective than CGE's. In 1970, EDF selected Framatome's proposal for building two French-language copies of the Beaver Valley pressurized water reactor, equipped with Alsthom turbines, at Fessenheim. Consequently, the original plan of constructing two UNGGs was scrapped. The subsequent year four additional reactors were authorized at Bugey, bringing the total number of reactors to six. These six reactors were commissioned between 1977 and 1979, and later they were known as the CP0 (contrat programme zéro) stage. From now on, French nuclear power plants will no longer be produced individually, but in identical power level tranches, like thermal power plants. This will standardize production and decrease costs.

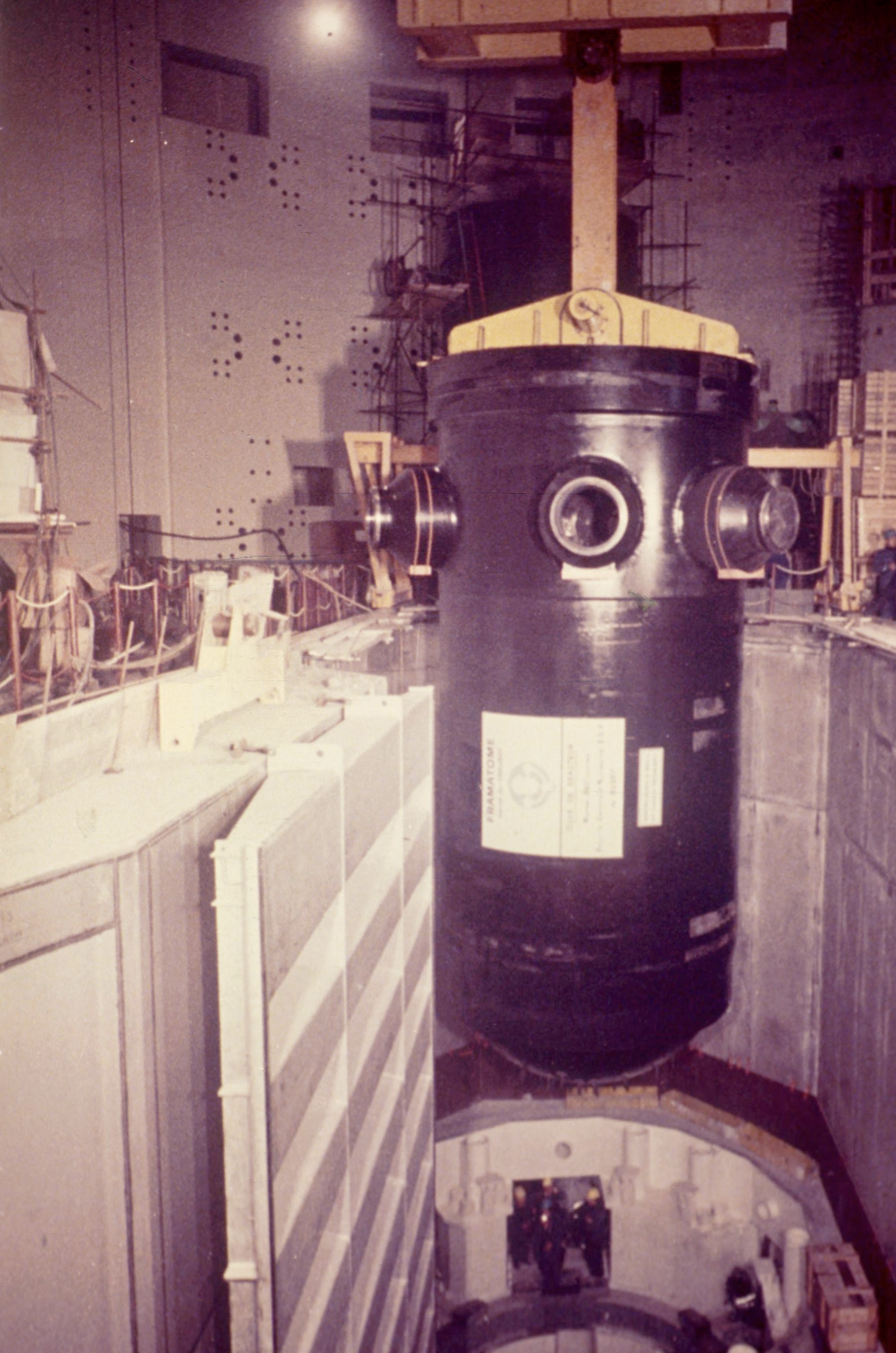
Installation of a CP0 PWR vessel.

In September 1972, CGE introduced the BWR-6, a General Electric boiling water reactor that boasted greater power (995 MWe) due to fuel enhancements. Subsequently, on February 4, 1974, EDF informed CGE of an order for eight reactors, which included two confirmed orders for Saint-Laurent-des-Eaux 3 and 4, while BBC purchased the associated turbine-generator sets. For CGE, the contract was valued at 3.5 billion francs (excluding taxes), and General Electric was entitled to a 2.5% royalty, equating to 87.5 million francs. Progress on the project moved quickly, with General Electric having already transmitted 10,000 documents by March 1, 1975. In addition, over 200 missions had been conducted in the United States by technicians in training, and 388 CGE employees were fully dedicated to the project. However, on August 4, 1975, EDF canceled the order due to a sharp cost increase, and passed it on to Framatome. This was a significant setback for CGE, leading to its withdrawal from the French nuclear industry. However, CGE obtained a major compensation; they secured Alsthom's place at the center of the national nuclear industry. By the end of 1976, Alsthom-Atlantique had a virtual monopoly on the French turbo-alternator market. The BBC turbines and their accompanying water stations are the only remains of the intended BWR installations at Saint-Laurent-des-Eaux. Instead, they were used to outfit the PWR reactors that replaced them on the site.

A decision was made by the Council of Ministers on August 6, 1975, to preserve only one kind of reactor: the PWR. The government mandated the complete consolidation of the domestic nuclear industry, asserting that the benefits of standardization surpass those that could be attained through competition among multiple providers. The existence of a sole vendor and operator, coupled with the constraints imposed by the Westinghouse license, which prevent EDF or CEA (Note: The government wished to limit the CEA's influence on industry, for example by preventing it from taking more than a 30% stake in Framatome in 1975 ("La société américaine Westinghouse propose de vendre la totalité de ses actions Framatome", Le Monde, December 19, 1975.) from making destabilizing alterations to the reactor design, will facilitate the streamlined production of forthcoming large-scale series.

=== Acceleration of the nuclear power program (Messmer plan) ===
"France has no coal, France has no oil, France has no gas, France has no choice."

— Lord Walter Marshall, Chairman of the Central Electricity Generating Board (CEGB), 1986.

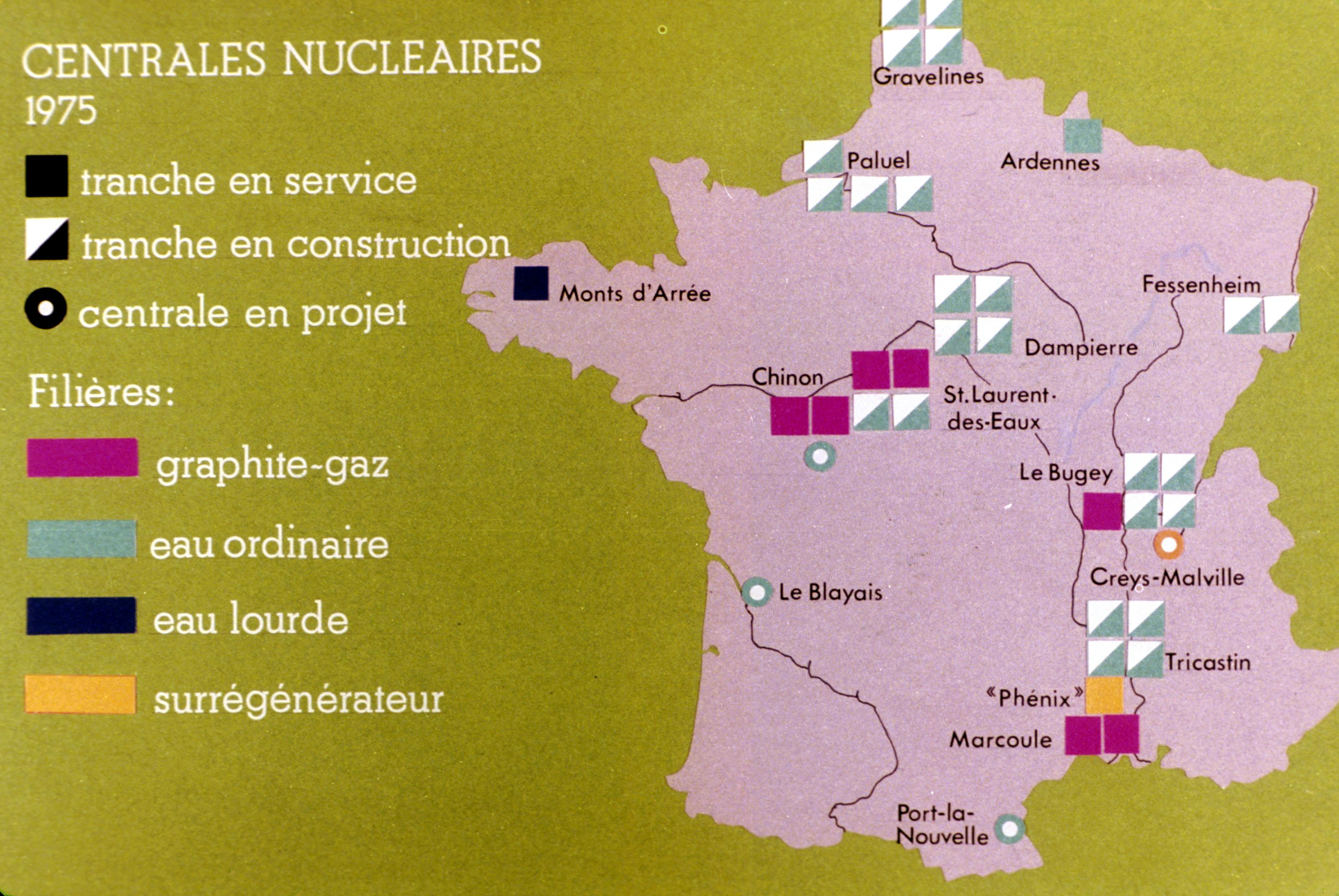
Map of French nuclear power plants in 1975.

International events caused France's nuclear power program to accelerate dramatically. The Arab-Israeli conflict, particularly the Yom Kippur War, resulted in the first oil shock, which increased oil prices four-fold between October 1973 and March 1974. This starkly emphasized the energy dependence and fragility of Western nations at a time when their economic growth began to slow down.

With domestic coal production on the decline and hydroelectric construction nearing completion, the inter-ministerial committee meeting of May 22, 1973 - which took place five months prior to the crisis in the Middle East - had already made the decision to increase the number of nuclear power plants under "Plan VI" from 8,000 to 13,000 megawatts (MW). These developments prompted the Pierre Messmer government to accelerate the program even further, leading to the creation of "Plan VII" or "Plan Messmer" on March 5, 1974. (Note: This massive nuclear equipment program called for the construction of around 170 reactors by the year 2000.) The 13,000 megawatts set to be constructed from 1972 to 1977 will be fully committed by the end of 1975. Afterward, EDF will maintain its investments by building six to seven reactors annually, equivalent to a commitment of 50,000 MW of nuclear power between 1974 and 1980. This installed capacity, which represents an additional 55,900 MWe reactors in operation, along with the current six, is estimated to cost a total of 83 billion euros (2010). Over the next decade, EDF will need to borrow over 100 billion euros, primarily through international markets, with the guarantee of the French government.

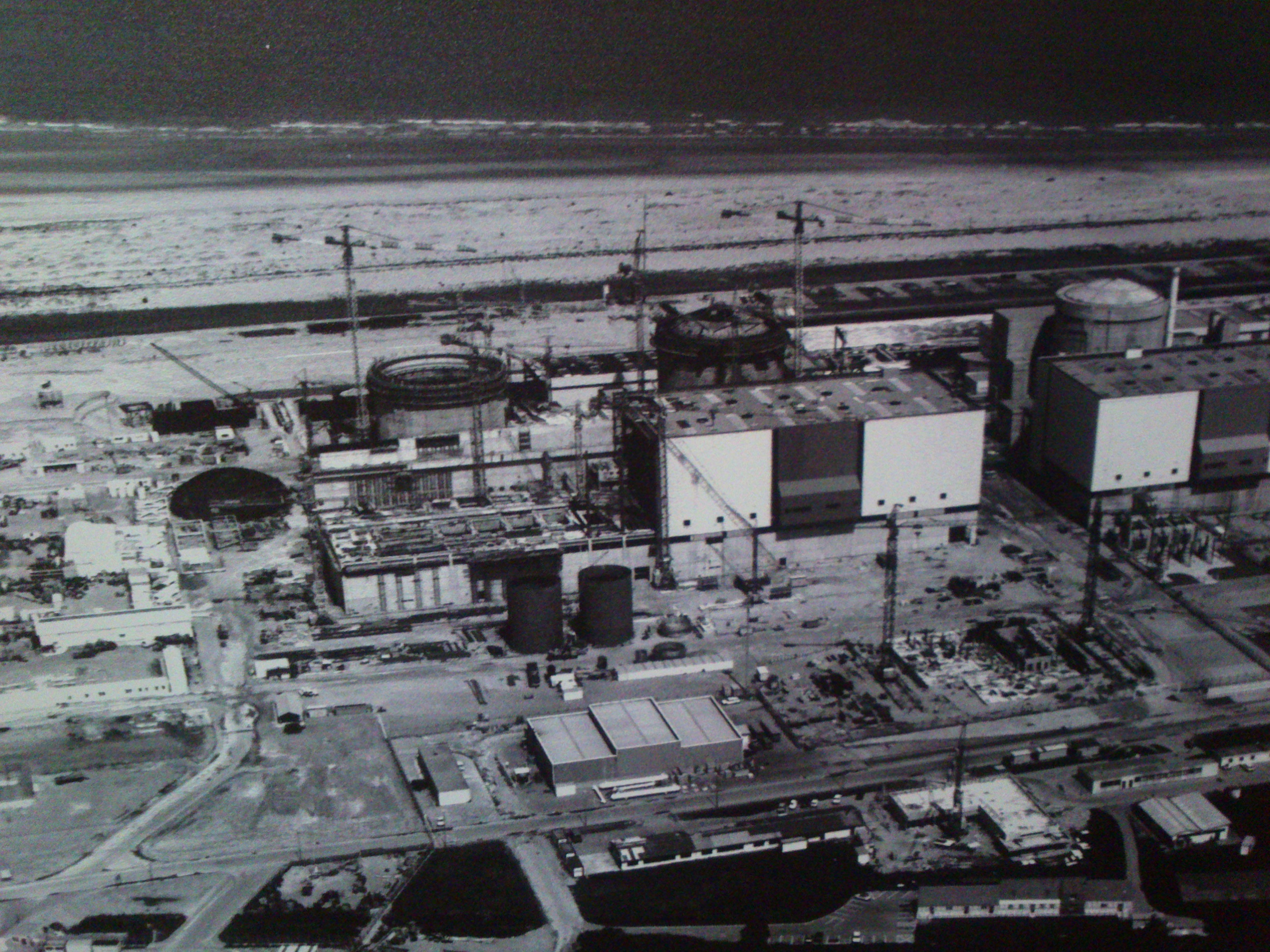
Construction of units 5 and 6 of the Gravelines nuclear power station, the last of the CP1 series.

Contract-Program 1, launched in 1974, consisted of 16,900 MWe units: Blayais (1–4), Dampierre (1–4), Gravelines (B1-B4), and Tricastin (1–4). Two more units (C5 and C6) were added in Gravelines in 1979, resulting in a total of 18 CP1 units. During Valéry Giscard d'Estaing's presidency, despite a stagnation in national electricity consumption, the Pompidou-Messmer plan continued at full speed due to the prioritization of reducing dependency on imported oil. The second oil crisis reinforced this determination. Contract-Program 2, which was launched in 1976, consists of ten units: Chinon (B1, B2, B3, B4), Cruas (1, 2, 3, and 4), and Saint-Laurent-des-Eaux (B1 and B2). The main difference between the CP2 stage and its predecessor is the radial placement of the machine room concerning the nuclear island. This arrangement prevents debris resulting from turbine failure from harming the reactor containment.

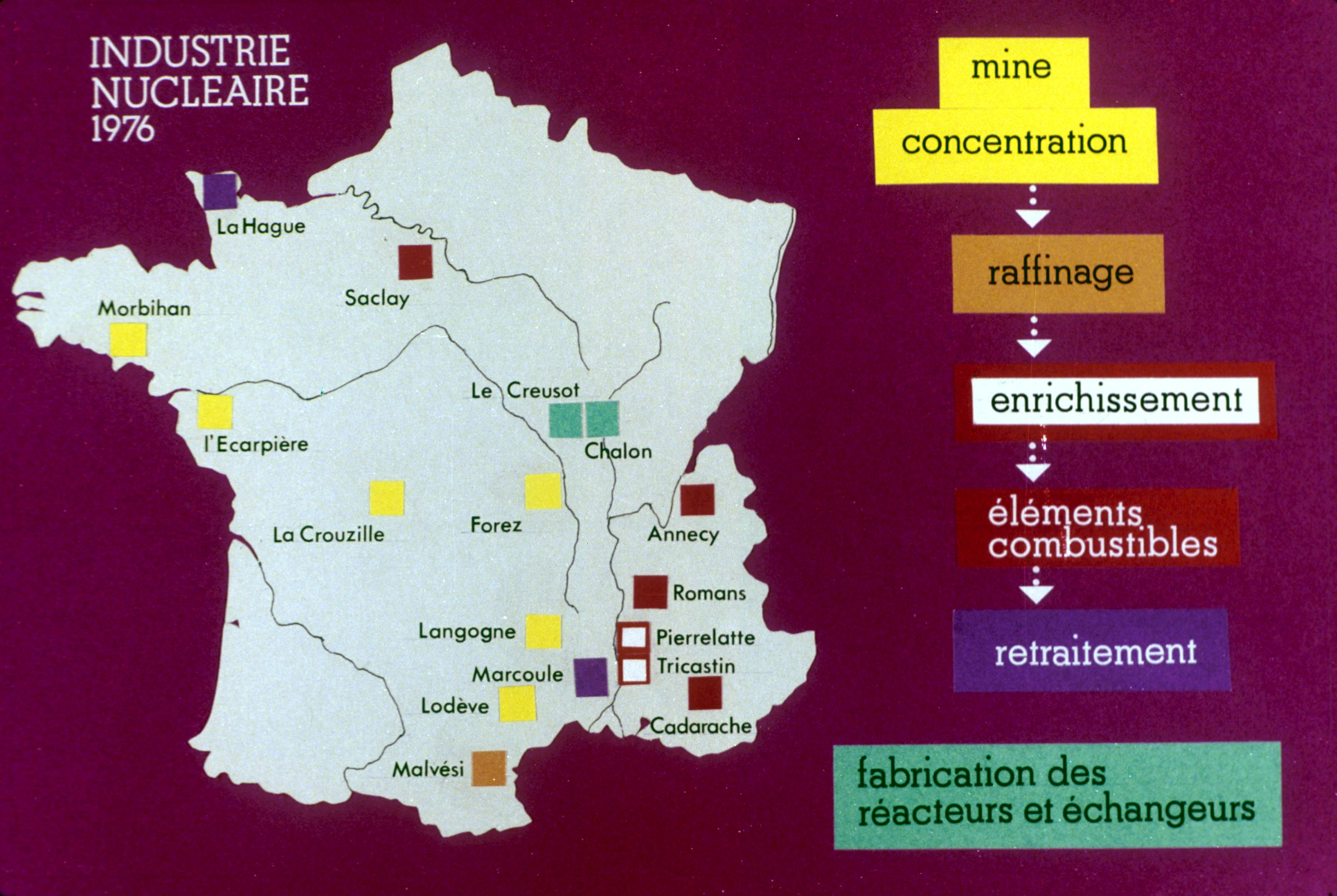
Map of the French nuclear industry in 1976.

The construction of the PWR fleet demanded sizable amounts of low-enriched uranium, procured from both the US and the USSR beginning in 1971. France aimed to establish European authority over the nuclear cycle and also rival the Urenco gas centrifuge enrichment initiative in Anglo-German-Dutch partnership. To that end, France collaborated with Belgium, Italy, Spain, and Sweden to construct a civil gaseous diffusion enrichment facility. The Eurodif Production group was established on February 25, 1972. In 1974, construction commenced on the Tricastin nuclear site. The Tricastin nuclear power plant was subsequently built to provide electricity to the facility (3,600 MW). Eurodif, later renamed Georges Besse, officially opened on April 9, 1979, as the site's enrichment plant. Located next to the Pierrelatte military enrichment plant, it utilized a portion of the latter's capacity until it achieved full capacity in 1982.

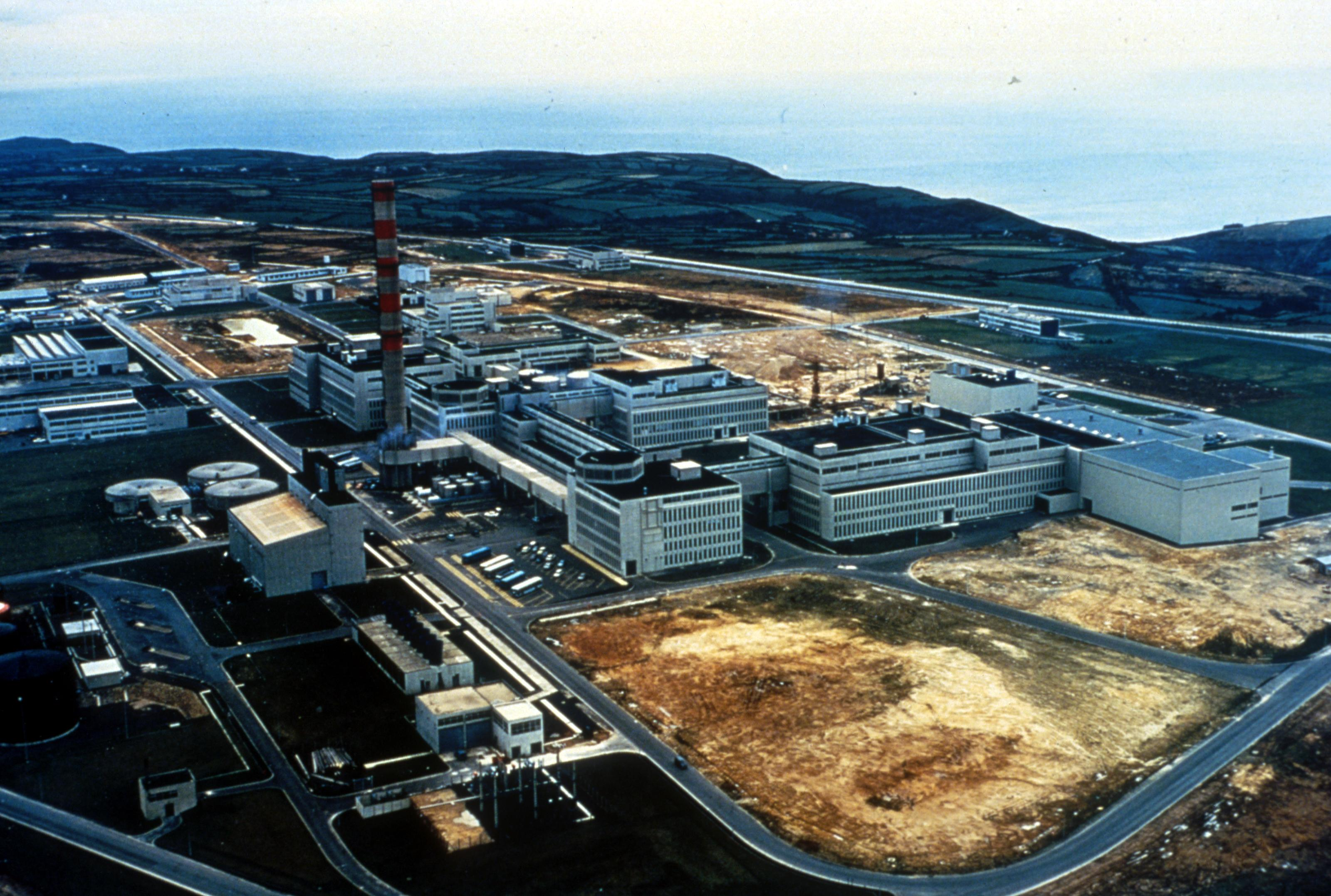
The La Hague reprocessing plant was modified in 1976 to receive EPR waste.

At the same time, during the downstream fuel cycle, the La Hague reprocessing plant underwent modifications to recycle high-level radioactive waste from the new pressurized water reactor line. As a result, a HAO (High Activity Oxide) workshop was added to the UP2-400 plant, which was put into service in April 1966 to aid the Marcoule plant (UP1) in extracting plutonium from UNGG spent fuel. In 1976, CEA transferred the responsibility for operating the complex to Cogema. In 1981, Cogema received authorization to construct two plants to manage the growing volume of waste. The plants, UP2-800 and UP3-A, were designed to process up to 800 tons of light-water spent fuel annually. UP3-A was funded by foreign customers and commissioned in 1990, whereas UP2-800 was commissioned in 1994.

=== First international contracts ===
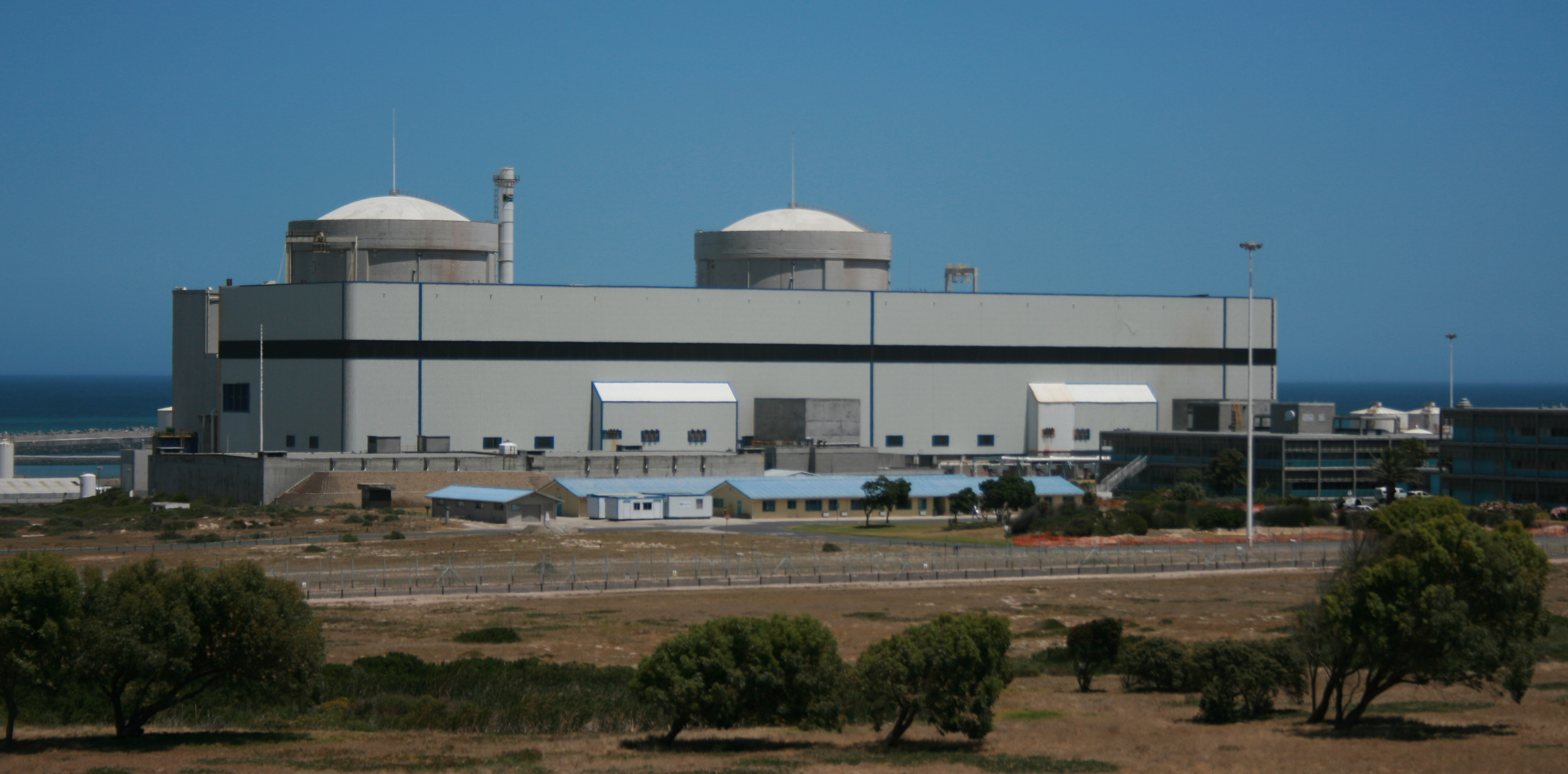
The Koeberg nuclear power station in South Africa, Framatome's first international contract, signed in 1976.

Similar to EDF, French manufacturers supported the light water option because its adoption allowed them to benefit from the experience gained across the Atlantic while avoiding the technical and financial risks involved in developing a new technology. The construction of the country's nuclear fleet provided an opportunity to develop major industrial groups that could Frenchify and export American nuclear technology.

Framatome secured its first major international contract for South Africa's second nuclear power plant. Initially, the South African authorities awarded the contract to American General Electric in April 1976. However, Washington's restrictions on the apartheid regime made them reconsider, resulting in Framatome being selected on May 19. As Pretoria demanded EDF's involvement in construction, both the French electricity company and Framatome established SOFINEL. In any case, Framatome, which holds the Westinghouse license, required EDF's expertise to construct a full-fledged plant and obtain its operator's license to initiate operations. Despite a terrorist attack, the two reactors at the Koeberg facility north of Cape Town, modeled after those at Bugey, entered commercial service in 1984 and 1985.

The subsequent deal was signed with Iran, France's primary oil supplier, which had already expressed interest in developing civilian and military nuclear power. The US did not support the Shah's ambitions, so he looked to France and signed a partnership agreement with them on June 27, 1974. Iran acquired Sweden's billion-dollar portion of Eurodif and ordered two reactors from Framatome/SOFINEL. Construction started at Darkhovin in 1977, with components fabricated the next year in France. However, the project ended with the Islamic Revolution of 1978. The completed components added two units to the Gravelines power plant, which started operating in 1985. The enriched uranium meant for Iran's Tricastin plant share was never delivered to the Islamic regime. It was only after several attacks and hostage-takings that a repayment agreement was signed on October 29, 1991.

The third deal came from South Korea. After two failed attempts in 1976 and 1977, Framatome secured the contract for South Korea's ninth and tenth nuclear reactors located at Uljin on November 7, 1980. Along with the contract, there was also a transfer of technology, and a South Korean company conducted the construction. The Hanul Nuclear Power Plant started operations in 1988.

CEA marketed research reactors via its subsidiary Technicatome. The company signed its most notable contract in 1976, worth 1.45 billion francs, with Iraq for the construction of Isis (Tammuz II) and Osiris (Tammuz I or Osirak) reactors at Saclay. This agreement was the result of talks that began two years ago between Iraq and then-Prime Minister Jacques Chirac for the exchange of oil for nuclear reactors. After the French government rejected Saddam Hussein's request for a UNGG reactor during his visit to the Cadarache center on November 6, 1975, this agreement was reached. Israel was against Iraq's program, citing its military goals. On April 6, 1979, Mossad demolished the reactor vessels being built at the Constructions industrielles de la Méditerranée (CNIM) plant in La Seyne-sur-Mer. Nevertheless, the contract still proceeded. On June 7, 1981, an air attack (Operation Opera) destroyed Osirak before it became operational. Even though France terminated its cooperation with Iraq in 1984, Tammuz II/Isis kept operating in the 1980s. The reactor was eventually obliterated in 1991.

=== Birth of the anti-nuclear movement ===
Logo "Nuclear Power? No Thanks!", created in 1975.

During the 1960s, when military nuclear power was at the forefront of national attention, civilian nuclear power was deemed an excellent opportunity for rural economic development, and few people worried about it. In the early 1970s, environmental awareness gave rise to the discussion of the aftermath of implementing nuclear energy. In 1974, most of the public favored civil nuclear power (76% in favor). However, after the initial demonstration at Fessenheim in April 1971, opposition grew rapidly among the French population. By early 1975, 4,000 scientists signed a petition (Note: In February 1975, physicists at the Collège de France launched the petition "Appel de scientifiques à propos du programme nucléaire français", nicknamed "L'appel des 400". Within three months, thousands of signatures were added to those of the 400 signatories of the first week, helping to legitimize the anti-nuclear movement.) denouncing the Messmer Plan's downplaying of risks and rashness and created the GSIEN association to inform the public. The original meaning was preserved while improving clarity, conciseness, formality, precision, structure, vocabulary, and grammatical correctness in American English.

In 1977, public opinion shifted, with 53% opposing the Superphénix project. In July, a manifestation in Creys-Malville turned violent, resulting in one fatality among the 40,000 to 90,000 attendees.

In response, public authorities urged the expansion of current sites and the construction of more robust facilities to mitigate the need for new power plants. Ultimately, out of the 43 sites considered in 1974, (Note: The 43 nuclear power plant sites selected are as follows: Pas-de-Calais: Oye-plage, Dannes; Seine-Maritime: Val-mesnil, Penly, Val-du-prêtre, Saint-Aubin, Val-d'Ausson, Vattetot-sur-Mer, Antifer; Calvados: Manvieux; Cotentin: Barfleur; Moselle: Sentzich-Cattenon; Bas-Rhin: Lauterbourg, Gerstheim, Sundhouse, Markolsheim; Marne: Omey or Couvrot, Aube: Crancey or Méry, Nogent-sur-Seine; Yonne: Pont-sur-Yonne; Loire-Atlantique or Maine-et-Loire: Ingrandes or Varades; Finistère: Beg-An-Fry, Plogoff; Morbihan: Erdeven; Loire-Atlantique: Corsept; Vendée: Bretignolles, Brèm-sur-Mer; Gironde: Le Verdon-sur-Mer; Tarn-et-Garonne: Golfech; Aude: Port-la-Nouvelle; Hérault: Sète; Saône-et-Loire: Sennecey-le-Grand; Isère: Creys-Malville, Saint-Maurice-l'Exil; Ardèche: Arras-sur-Rhône, Soyons, Cruas; Bouches-du-Rhône: Martigues. Luxembourg: Remerschon; FRG: Vieux-Brisack; Switzerland: Verbois.) 19 will accommodate French PWRs, four of which are currently home to UNGG reactors. Apart from concerns related to the French power grid, the site selection is strategic: 17 of the 19 communes (excluding Gravelines and Nogent-sur-Seine) designated for hosting power plants share a similar rural profile and have faced depopulation and a lack of industry. The income, development, and job opportunities resulting from the power plants will create a significant reliance on the surrounding areas. Additionally, EDF is enlisting the services of architects and landscape architects during the P4 stage to reduce the impact of its facilities on the environment. Sociologists, psychologists, and semiologists are also working to improve the social acceptability of nuclear power by changing its public image. From April 1975 to 1982, an EDF "nuclear information group" received and responded to up to 500 letters daily. They successfully organized visits to power plants. These information campaigns, combined with certain anti-nuclear groups' radicalization, flip-flopped public opinion, causing opposition to wane.

Opposition to nuclear power became local, especially in Brittany and Loire-Atlantique. This local opposition led to the abandonment of the Plogoff and Pellerin power plant projects in 1983, respectively, after numerous demonstrations. However, in the Ardennes, the opposition failed to prevent the Chooz nuclear power plant from being extended.

In the early 1980s, pro-nuclear sentiment reigned supreme in France, with 65% favoring it in 1982 and 67% in 1985. This was despite numerous accidents that rocked the industry and underscored the pressing need to prioritize safety throughout the nuclear cycle. Notably, the Three Mile Island nuclear disaster in 1979, where a PWR core melted, causing minimal radioactive emissions into the environment. In 1980, the Saint-Laurent-des-Eaux nuclear power plant experienced France's most serious nuclear accident to date, as two fuel elements in the A2 reactor (UNGG) melted down. The incident was classified as level 4 on the INES scale, signifying "an accident not entailing any significant risk outside the site". Nevertheless, the French people's recently acquired faith in nuclear power and concerned authorities was short-lived.

Against the rising environmental movement, François Mitterrand's (Socialist Party) platformed for the 1981 French presidential election (proposition 38) that "the nuclear program will be restricted to power plants being built until the nation can vote on it, after being truly informed in a referendum." In the lead up to the election, Francois Mitterrand acknowledged that the use of nuclear energy is inevitable nowadays. However, he emphasized the need to limit and control its development to prevent a technical and economic impasse similar to that of the all-oil era in the 1960s. He also spoke out against the entire nuclear program that was forced upon the French people.

== A time of questioning (1983-1999) ==
While the oil shocks signaled the beginning of substantial equipment programs in countries affected by oil imports such as France and Japan, they paradoxically resulted in a cessation of nuclear investment. The United States was the first to halt such investment, largely for economic reasons, (Note: In the United States, in addition to the effects of popular protest, nuclear investment fell sharply after 1975, as electricity producers sharply revised their forecast requirements downwards in the wake of the slowdown in economic growth.) followed by Europe due to political pressures from anti-nuclear movements emboldened by significant accidents. In France, where the environmental movement had minimal effect, the expansion of nuclear power plants persisted despite increased costs. However, the potential for excess production continued to exist. During this time, the previously overlooked subject of sustainable management of radioactive waste became prominent in the public's perception of nuclear power.

=== Completing the industrial park ===
The early 1980s marked the commercial launch of CP1 nuclear reactors, operating from 1980 to 1985, and CP2 reactors, operating from 1983 to 1988. During this time, nuclear power accounted for 37% of America's national electricity production, a figure that rose to 55% three years later. However, due to energy-conservation initiatives and decreased economic growth, electricity consumption plateaued, leading to concerns about the overcapacity of the nuclear power program. In 1983, François Mitterrand's presidency led to a reduction in the construction pace to one unit annually. To justify fleet development, EDF boosted its exports and became Europe's primary exporter. Additionally, the promotion of electric heating spurred its adoption as the standard in new housing.

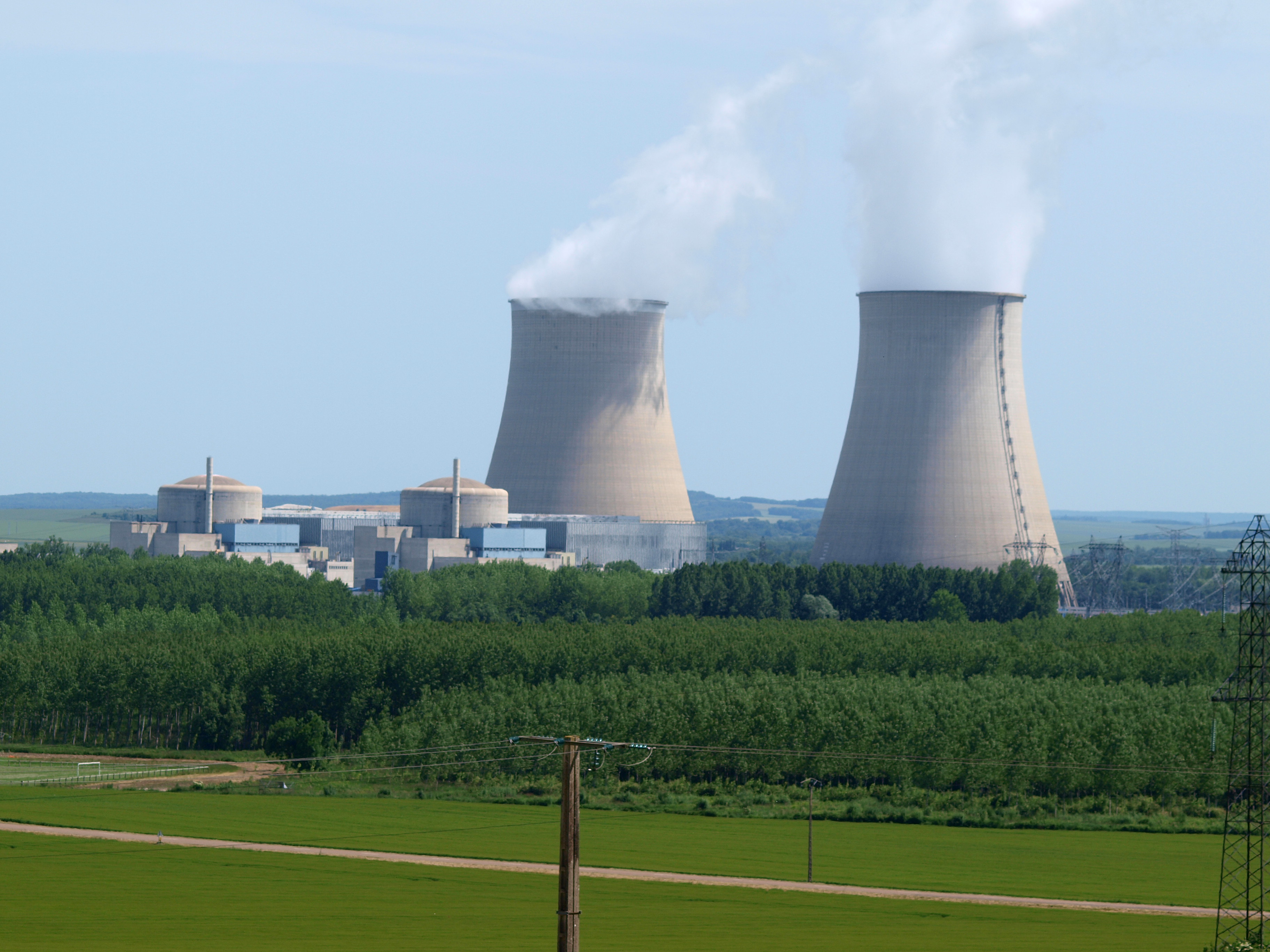
Nogent nuclear power plant. Two P'4 reactors in service in 1988.

The major construction projects continued with the P4 stage, consisting of four-loop reactors (compared to three-loop reactors, hence the name) with a power output of 1,300 MWe. This project was a result of Framatome and Westinghouse's collaboration since 1972. (Note: Between 1976 and 1980, Westinghouse, CEA and Framatome equally financed a development program for power plants over 1,000 MWe.) The objective was to offset the extended construction schedules and expenses incurred during prior stages, which is the reason for the increase in unit power. Eight units, which were ordered between 1975 and 1982, were put into commission from 1984 to 1987. The Flamanville (1 and 2), Paluel (1 to 4), and Saint-Alban (1 and 2) reactors were constructed first. Following those, there was the P'4 level (a hybrid of P4), which involved the staggered construction of 12 new units between 1979 and 1984 and commissioning from 1987 to 1994. Lastly, the reactors at Belleville (1 and 2), Cattenom (1, 2, 3, and 4), Nogent (1 and 2), Penly (1 and 2), and Golfech (1 and 2) were built. In comparison to P4, power and safety systems remain the same while the buildings have been reduced in size to cut costs.

Nevertheless, moving from CP0 to P'4 did not yield the anticipated economies of scale, primarily due to the introduction of more rigorous regulations, as stated by the French Court of Accounts in 2012. (Note: The cost of nuclear reactors in France has risen from two billion euros per pair for the CP1 and CP2 stages to three billion for the P4 and P'4 stages (2010 values).)

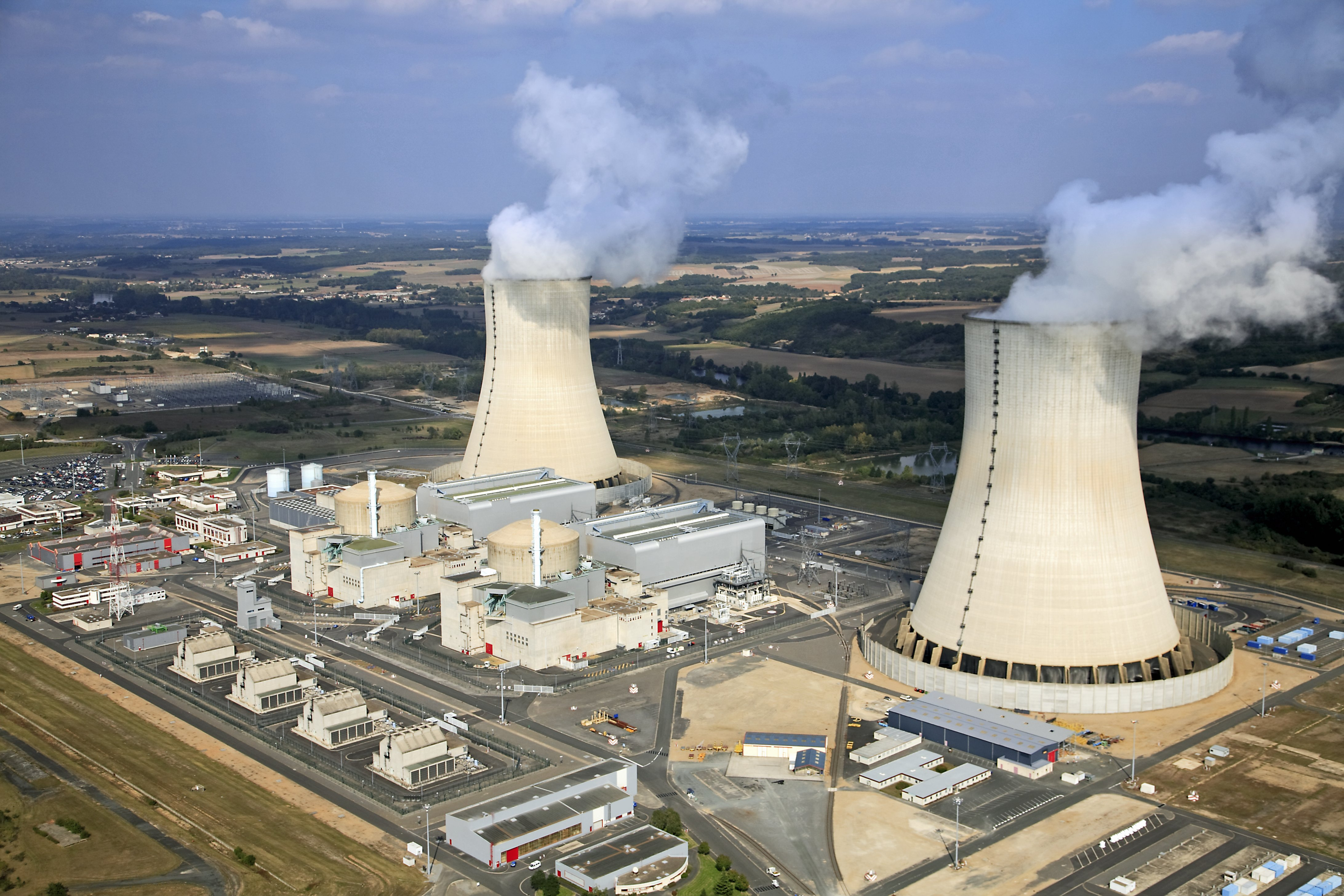
Civaux Nuclear Power Plant. Two N4 reactors commissioned in 1997. Last Generation II nuclear power plant built in France.

Framatome reached a pivotal moment in 1981 by signing a long-term Nuclear Technical Cooperation Agreement (NTCA) with Westinghouse. The agreement was grounded on Westinghouse's admiration for the skills of the French manufacturer, with reciprocal exchanges taking place. Even though royalties were substantially reduced, payment still had to be made. This technical and commercial independence allowed Westinghouse to fully withdraw from Framatome's capital. This enabled the French company to create its own reactor models, including the N4 series. The N4 series consists of four 1,500 MW units, designed entirely by the French, with development beginning in 1977. The Chooz B (1 and 2) and Civaux (1 and 2) reactors were part of this project, with construction taking place from 1984 to 1991 and commercial commissioning occurring from 1996 to 1999. In 1992, the agreement between Westinghouse and Framatome ended, leading to the discontinuation of royalties and full francization of Framatome-built reactors. The design advancements of these new reactors considered feedback from already functioning 900 and 1,300 MW reactors, in addition to lessons learned from the Three Mile Island nuclear disaster. In addition to introducing the "Arabelle" turbines and new primary pumps, the main improvement of the P'4 series was the complete computerization of the control room. Chooz B was the first power plant in the world to be equipped with this technology. Civaux was the second power plant to be equipped with the computerization, and it was the last nuclear power plant to be built in France. The 1999 commercial launch of its second reactor, the 58th one since Fessenheim, marked an end to nearly thirty years of unbroken construction activities that set EDF back to the tune of 106 billion euros in 2018. (Note: Investments in the construction of France's second-generation nuclear power plants (CP0 to N4) totaled €96 billion, including €13 billion in interest (2010 values).)

Back then, nuclear power contributed to 76% of France's total electricity generation, a larger share than any other country had.

=== The Chernobyl shock ===
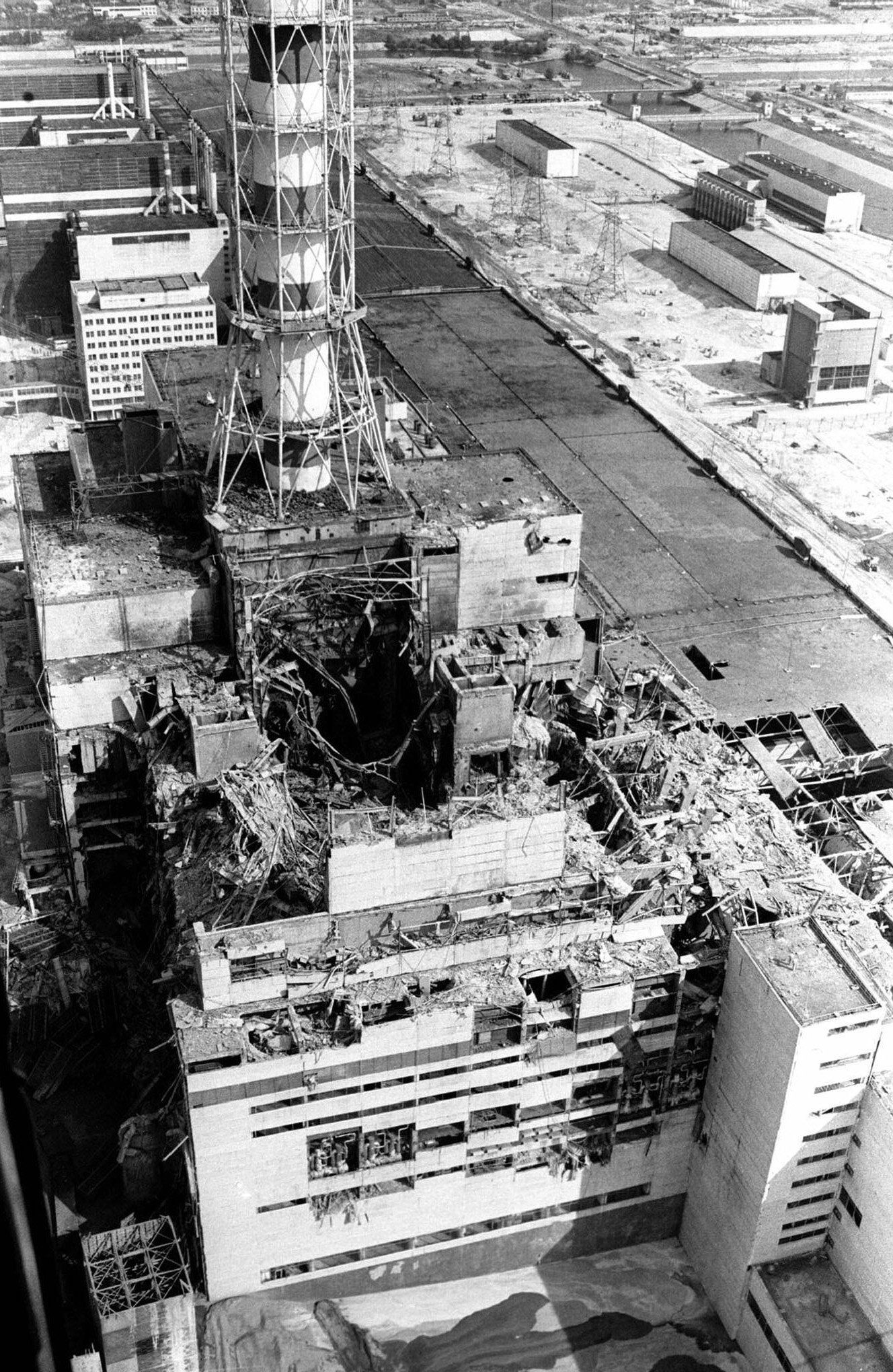
The gutted reactor building at the Chernobyl nuclear power plant, 1986.

Chernobyl's disaster on April 26, 1986, marked a pivotal moment in the history of civil nuclear power. The incident resulted in the core of a reactor melting down, causing an explosion and a significant discharge of radioactivity into the environment, which led to countless fatalities, including some resulting from radiation exposure. The Chernobyl disaster was the first incident to be categorized at level 7 on the International Nuclear Event Scale (INES) and remains the most severe nuclear accident prior to the Fukushima incident in 2011. The consequences of the disaster were extensive, spanning health, ecological, economic, and political realms. Over 300,000 individuals were displaced from the surrounding region.

While nearby countries swiftly implemented preventative measures, such as prohibiting consumption of specific foods, French public authorities provided minimal communication and attempted to downplay the impact of the disaster while acknowledging the rise in radioactivity. Certain media interpreted the released radioactive cloud from the explosion as having halted at the border. Abnormal radioactivity levels were detected at CEA facilities and EDF nuclear power plants as early as April 28, but the SCPRI did not acknowledge the particle plume reaching France until May 1 and did not release the first soil contamination map until May 10. Following Chernobyl, nuclear power's image in Europe was permanently affected, leading to changes in national programs. New power plant construction projects were generally suspended with only those currently underway completed. Italy withdrew from nuclear power, followed by Yugoslavia, the Netherlands, Belgium, and Germany in subsequent years. In France, the lack of transparency among authorities impacted public opinion, giving rise to a resurgence of the anti-nuclear movement and the formation of autonomous radioactivity monitoring groups like CRIIRAD and ACRO. However, the incident itself, did not prompt any inquiries into the energy policy. When the accident happened, construction on the P'4 and new N4 reactors was still in progress and far from being finished.

France participated in the discussions that began in 1992 to define binding international commitments on nuclear safety. France signed the International Convention on Nuclear Safety on September 20, 1994, (Note: The following countries are signatories to the International Convention on Nuclear Safety: Algeria, Argentina, Armenia, Australia, Austria, Belgium, Brazil, Bulgaria, Canada, Chile, China, Cuba, Czech Republic, Denmark, Egypt, Finland, France, Germany, Greece, Hungary, India, Indonesia, Ireland, Israel, Italy, Japan, Luxembourg, Netherlands, Nicaragua, Nigeria, Norway, Pakistan, Peru, Philippines, Poland, Portugal, Slovakia, Romania, Slovenia, South Africa, South Korea, Sudan, Sweden, Syria, Tunisia, Turkey, Ukraine, United Kingdom and United States.) and ratified it the following year. The Convention came into effect following the decree of October 24, 1996. France's first report on the safety of its power plants was released in September 1998. In 2001, the Institut de Radioprotection et de Sûreté Nucléaire (IRSN) became operational, assuming the safety roles formerly held by the Ministry of Health and the CEA.

=== The Chinese market ===
"France was the first country to enter into negotiations with China on a nuclear power plant project, the first to be willing to sell us reactors, and the first to declare its readiness to transfer its technology to us without subsequent control of its use."

— Li Peng, Minister of Energy, 1984.

In the 1970s, Deng Xiaoping aimed to modernize China, including implementing a civilian nuclear power program. Although the military preferred heavy-water reactors, the Ministry of Electricity selected foreign pressurized-water reactors, specifically from France. As the first Western country to recognize the People's Republic of China in 1964, France appeared to be the sole nation willing to share its nuclear expertise.

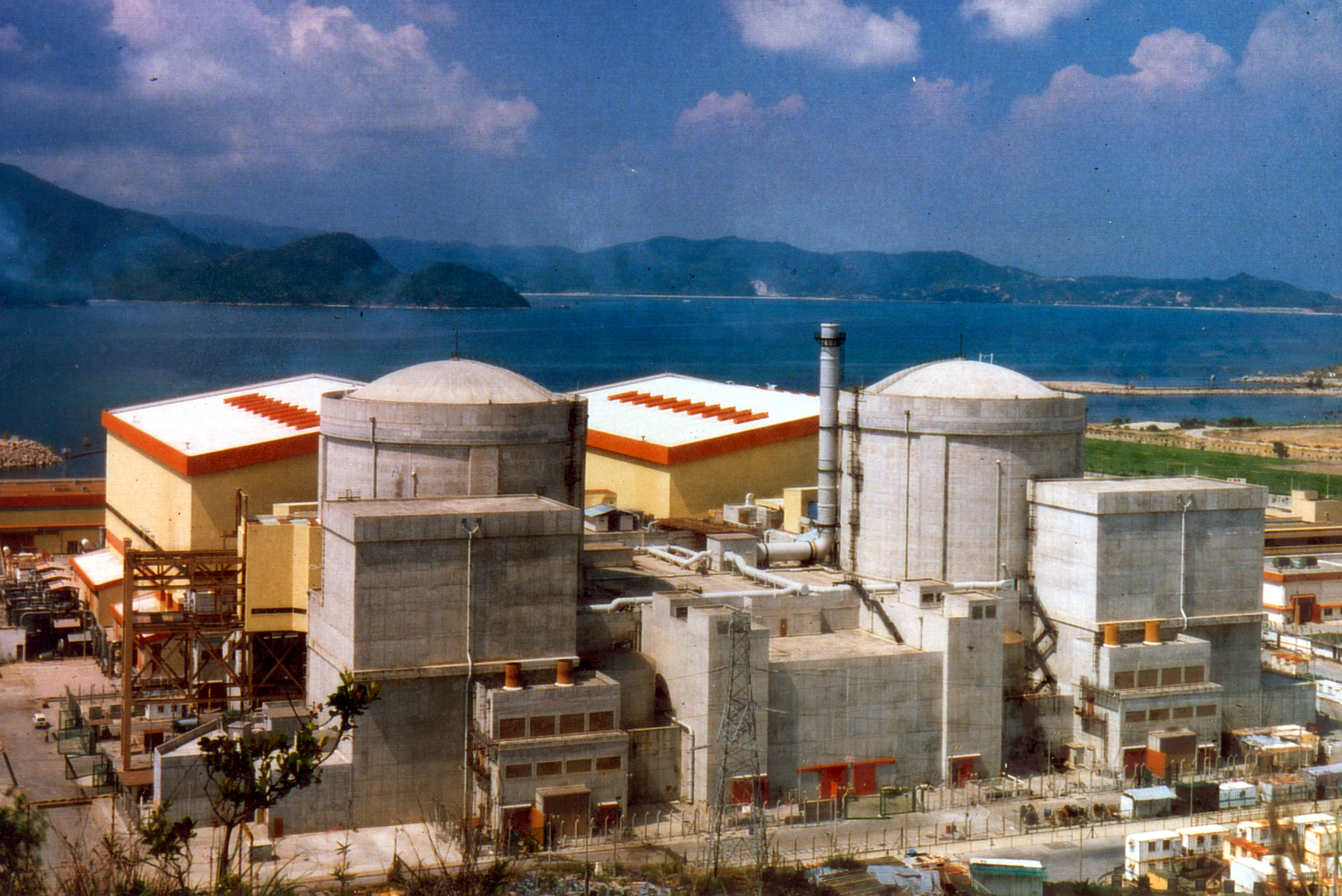
Daya Bay nuclear power plant. First French nuclear contract in China.

After several unsuccessful attempts, cooperation with China on the construction of nuclear reactors and technology transfer began during President François Mitterrand's visit to Beijing in May 1983. The first plant was set to be built in the fast-developing Guangdong region, specifically on Daya Bay, and financed with the assistance of Hong Kong. This financing led to Franco-British collaboration in manufacturing the turbines for the plant, which then resulted in the merger between GEC and Alsthom. The Chinese authorities desired N4 reactors, yet they approved a model derived from the slightly enhanced CP1 units 5 and 6 of the Gravelines plant. On January 19, 1985, the agreement was signed, and the construction commenced under the supervision of EDF the following year. Despite the events of Tiananmen Square and the Taiwan frigate affair, which strained relations with Beijing, the plant was inaugurated on February 10, 1994.

Meanwhile, Framatome set up a fuel fabrication plant in Yibin in 1995 and announced the development of a second plant in the same area called Ling Ao. The new facility would consist of two reactors paralleling those in the Daya Bay plant. EDF, Framatome (nuclear island), and GEC-Alsthom (turbines) were selected without a bidding process, in exchange for a low-interest loan obtained from eight French banks. The contract was signed on October 25, 1995. Construction was conducted by the Chinese company CGNPC. The reactors were commissioned ahead of schedule, in 2002 and 2003. To the dismay of French industry leaders, China later decided to broaden its range of nuclear technologies, incorporating Canadian (CANDU) and Russian (VVER) models. However, following a visit by President Jacques Chirac in 1997, China developed its own reactor, the CPR-1000, based on the French CP1 and N4 designs, with assistance from EDF, Framatome, and GEC-Alsthom.

=== Development of the European EPR reactor ===
The Chernobyl disaster and the oil glut caused many countries to slow down or completely abandon their nuclear programs, putting pressure on the nuclear industry. In response, the industry shifted its focus to exports, a highly competitive market that necessitated the consolidation of the European industry. Against this backdrop, Framatome and Siemens signed a cooperation agreement on April 13, 1989, and established a joint company. The objective of this partnership, backed by the respective governments, was to create pressurized water reactors using Franco-German technology. Initially, this was for the benefit of both countries, and subsequently for all organizations worldwide that generate nuclear power.

Meanwhile, EDF explored options for the French nuclear program's sustainability and developed plans for constructing a novel pressurized water reactor (PWR) to succeed the original reactors that were initiated in the 1970s. The anticipated completion date for the new reactor was set around 2010. In 1986, EDF initiated the REP 2000 project, a new evolutionary phase of reactor models that were expected to be operational between 2000 and 2015. Initially, the REP 2000 project was conceived for France with the aim of improving safety measures and reducing production costs while also optimizing uranium utilization. However, due to the recession in the early 1990s and the subsequent improvement in plant availability, it was determined that additional N4 reactors were unnecessary. As a result, the construction of Units 3 and 4 at the Penly, Flamanville, and Saint-Alban plants was canceled, and the REP 2000 project, also known as N4+, was merged with the Franco-German project. On February 23, 1995, EDF and nine German utilities collaborated with Framatome and Siemens to initiate engineering studies for the European Pressurized Reactor (EPR), a third-generation nuclear reactor intended to revamp the nuclear fleet. This "evolutionary" reactor, with a planned unit power of 1,450 MWe that will be increased to 1,650 MWe for greater competitiveness, can incorporate technological advances of both the Konvoi and N4 reactors to feature improved safety (core catcher, buildings more resistant to aircraft crashes, absence of bottom penetrations and additional safety systems), an extended service life, greater utilization of MOx fuel, and enhanced thermal efficiency. The preliminary design was submitted to the French and German safety authorities in October 1997.

EDF selected the Le Carnet site, near Le Pellerin, to construct the EPR prototype. Despite significant local opposition, Prime Minister Alain Juppé approved the project. The Plural Left government's election resulted in the cancellation of the project in 1997. In 1999, Germany decided to withdraw from nuclear power, and ten years later, Siemens ended its collaboration with Framatome, now Areva NP. The European reactor, which had always been Franco-German, is now entirely French.

=== From Superphénix to MOx ===
"With this type of reactor [breeder reactors] and its plutonium reserves, France will have as much energy as Saudi Arabia with all its oil."

— Valéry Giscard d'Estaing, President of France, Europe 1, January 25, 1980.

At the beginning of the 1950s, uranium was rare enough to make us imagine that it would soon be in short supply. The development of reactors using plutonium was seen as a safeguard against a possible shortage. The French nuclear industry was to be based on primary cells using natural uranium to produce electricity and plutonium, which secondary cells would have "burned" to produce electricity while generating more fissile material than they consumed, hence the name breeder reactors. With a view to making the French nuclear cycle self-sufficient, the CEA commissioned two experimental fast-neutron sodium-cooled reactors of this type: Rapsodie in 1967 at Cadarache, followed by the more powerful Phénix (250 MWe) in 1973 at Marcoule.

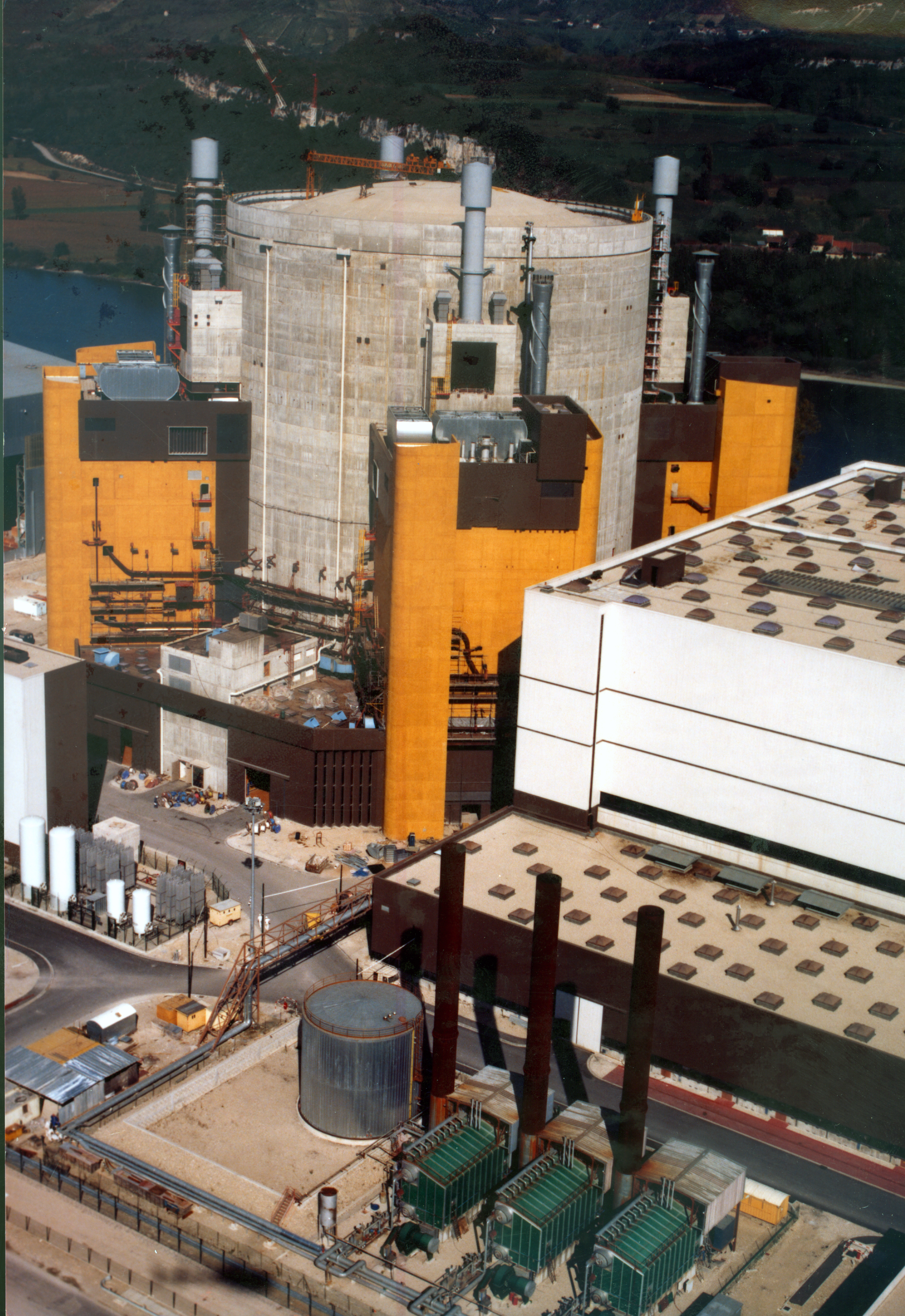
The Superphenix reactor's 85 m-high containment building.

While uranium proved more abundant than expected in the 1960s, the oil crisis of the 1970s and the rapid nuclear program development worldwide revived concerns of a fissile element shortage. As a result, fast-breeder reactors regained prominence. After discontinuing the UNGG line, the CEA ceased to function as a national reactor designer and shifted its focus to the fuel cycle's mastery. They also worked on developing a line capable of recycling plutonium, with Rapsodie III, later renamed Superphénix, serving as the industrial prototype. On April 15, 1976, French Prime Minister Jacques Chirac greenlit the 4.4 billion franc project, which was the result of European collaboration. (Note: Superphénix is being built by NERSA (Société Anonyme Européenne à Neutrons Rapides), a subsidiary of EDF (51%), Italy's Enel (33%) and Germany's SBK (16%).) With a power output of 1,200 MWe, the upcoming Creys-Mépieu plant would become the world's most potent breeder reactor. The reactor first diverged on September 7, 1985, and it was ultimately connected to the grid on January 14. The laborious nine-year construction span was accompanied by massive demonstrations in 1977, making it one of the most substantial events in the history of French anti-nuclear activism. Additionally, the plant witnessed a rocket launcher attack in 1982, and the final price tag spiraled up to 25 billion francs, as indicated by sources.

On March 8, 1987, a sodium leakage caused the reactor to shut down until January 1989. This incident had a lasting impact on Superphénix's reputation, occurring merely a year after Chernobyl. The Americans led the way in abandoning the fast breeder reactor option, after which the Germans and the British followed. In December 1990, the roof of the machine room collapsed due to snowfall. The reactor did not resume operations until August 4, 1994, after multiple delays and a change in its classification to that of a research reactor under the Bataille law. On December 25 of the same year, a new leak occurred which resulted in a 7-month shutdown. 1996 marked the first year in which the reactor functioned efficiently and generated substantial amounts of electricity. However, disregarding the CEA's advice, Prime Minister Lionel Jospin made the definitive decision to close the plant on December 30, 1998, citing the low price of uranium in comparison to the overall cost of operating Superphénix (60 billion francs in 1994, equivalent to 13 billion euros in 2018).

Simplified diagram of the nuclear fuel chain.

In 1982, falling uranium prices and delays in the Superphénix project led to a prolonged postponement of the industrial development of fast breeder reactors. As a result, EDF examined another option to recycle plutonium previously researched by the CEA and their Belgian and German counterparts in the early 1960s: Mixed Oxides (MOx), a fuel for PWRs consisting of 8.6% plutonium and depleted uranium. Mixed Oxides (MOx), a fuel for PWRs consisting of 8.6% plutonium and depleted uranium. Mixed Oxides (MOx), a fuel for PWRs consisting of 8.6% plutonium and depleted uranium. Trials at the Franco-Belgian Chooz power plant, which commenced in 1974, validated the concept's effectiveness. In 1987, EDF retrofitted its CP1 and CP2 plants for the purpose and deployed the technique first at Saint-Laurent-des-Eaux and then in five other locations (Gravelines, Dampierre, Blayais, Tricastin, and Chinon). MOx was manufactured at the Cadarache plutonium technology workshop from 1967 to 2005 and at the Melox facility in Marcoule since 1995. Reprocessing spent fuel into MOx would be as expensive as storing it. Since reprocessing only makes economic sense if the resulting materials are reused, the advantage of MOx would only be to provide an outlet for the products of the La Hague reprocessing plant, especially its UP2-800 unit, as the fast-breeder reactor option was abandoned.

=== The waste management issue ===
In France, nuclear reactors' used fuel is not considered waste because it contains uranium and plutonium that can be recycled to create MOx fuel or fuel future breeder reactors. Spent fuel can therefore be stored "temporarily" in pools, whether or not it is currently being reprocessed. Only non-recoverable nuclear materials are classified as waste and are undergoing permanent storage solutions either in place or under study. However, since 1978, the waste has undergone vitrification at Marcoule and since 1989 at La Hague.

It is now being stored on-site until a permanent storage solution is identified. The highly dangerous, long-lasting waste resulting from reprocessing was first kept as liquid in tanks. The quest for such a solution started early on. Similar to the disposal of outdated ammunition from both World Wars, the sea was considered. It diluted pollution. From 1950 to 1963, the United Kingdom and Belgium dumped waste in the Hurd's Deep off the Cotentin peninsula, and France participated in this policy coordinated by the European Nuclear Energy Agency (ENA) by submerging liquid and solid low-level radioactive waste from Marcoule in the depths of the Atlantic Ocean. This practice ended in 1969 with the opening of the Manche storage center beside the La Hague plant. After January 1992, it was replaced by the Aube storage center due to saturation.

The deployment of nuclear power plants in the 1970s and the resulting volume of spent fuel drastically altered the situation. The London Treaty, which was enacted in 1975, prohibited the dumping of highly radioactive waste. To rid the world of this waste for good, France initiated studies on entombment, leading to a consensus in 1977 that sparked significant progress. Several campaigns were conducted between 1979 and 1988 off Cape Verde, followed by the North Atlantic. These expeditions were aimed at evaluating the feasibility of burying it deep in marine sediments and were part of the international Seabed program. On November 12, 1993, the Convention signatories decided to prohibit the disposal of any type of radioactive waste at sea after a decade-long pause, and consequently, this solution was abandoned. Nonetheless, some low-level radioactive effluents from fuel reprocessing, such as tritium and iodine-129, are still discharged off Cap de la Hague.

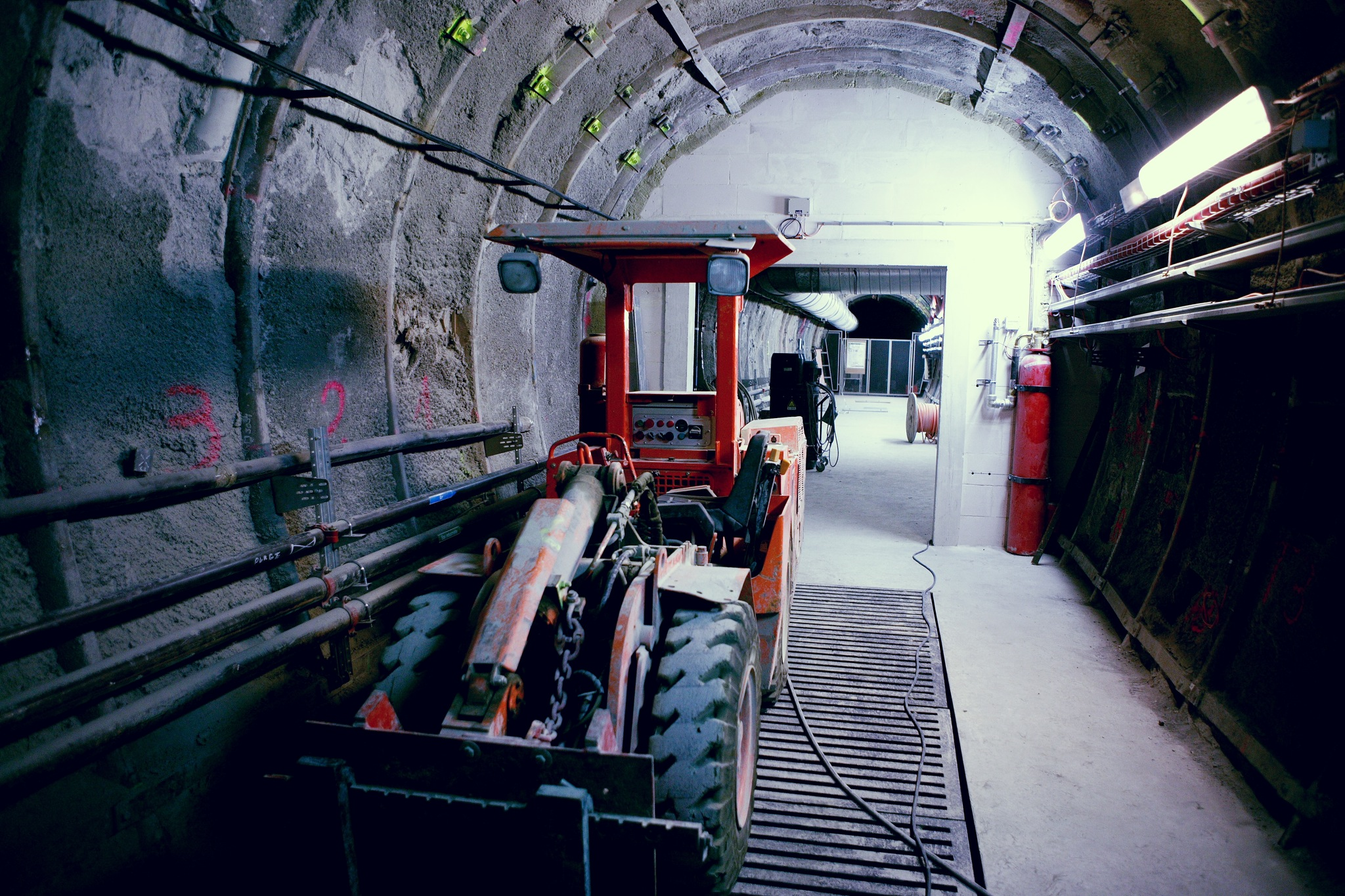
A gallery in the Meuse/Haute Marne Underground Research Laboratory.

The search for an appropriate disposal site in France started with the establishment of the Agence Nationale pour la Gestion des Déchets Radioactifs (ANDRA) within the CEA in 1979. From 1982 to 1984, the Castaing (Note: Named after Raimond Castaing, director of the working group on research and development in radioactive waste management.) Commission suggested deep geological disposal as a solution, as well as exploring other alternatives. Prospecting for underground labs, which started in 1987, faced strong opposition in the departments chosen for their diverse geologies (Ain, Aisne, Deux-Sèvres and Maine-et-Loire), leading Michel Rocard's government to halt work in early 1990. The research law on radioactive waste management (the Bataille law), (Note: Law N° 91-1381.) enacted in 1991, pacified the debate by outlining research in three complementary areas: transmutation, long-term storage, and geological disposal. In the same year, ANDRA gained independence from the CEA and resumed its prospecting activities. On December 9, 1998, ANDRA selected a geological site in the Meuse region of France at Bure. A laboratory was built by ANDRA between 1999 and 2004 at a depth of 490 meters within an impermeable and stable argillite layer to investigate the viability of an industrial, reversible geological disposal center known as Cigéo. On June 28, 2006, the Bataille law was replaced by a new law that confirmed the selection of this storage solution.

== Total cost of French nuclear facilities in 2012 ==
Following the Fukushima nuclear accident in 2011, the French government requested that the Court of Accounts prepare a report on the overall cost of both public and private investment in the French nuclear power industry from its beginning, including all expenditures. The report estimates that the industry has cost around 228 billion euros for a yearly production of roughly 400 TWh, with a cumulative production of approximately 11,000 TWh. Among the expenses, the Court of Accounts differentiates €55 billion spent on research since 1950 (equivalent to approximately a billion dollars annually) and €121 billion spent on construction, which includes €96 billion on the 58 reactors.

== Restructuring the sector (1999 to 2020) ==
Following the 1990s, the global fight against climate change, widely supported by the Kyoto Protocol, and the growing energy demands of developing nations reinvigorated the nuclear energy industry on a global scale. In the early 2000s, France witnessed the liberalization of its electricity market for European competition. However, the current local business climate did not support the development of nuclear power due to its requirement for significant investment, rendering it less competitive in the short run when compared to quicker-to-build technologies such as gas turbines.

=== Opening of the electricity market ===
From February 1, 1999, Électricité de France (EDF), a quasi-public monopoly, was gradually deregulated to allow competition in electricity production and supply as per European Union directives. (Note: European Directive 96/92/EC of December 1996.) Initially, the French electricity market was opened up to the largest customers (Note: Law N° 2000-108 of February 10, 2000 on the modernization and development of the public electricity service.) whose consumption exceeded a threshold set by the decree. Later, following the March 2002 decisions of the Barcelona European Council, the market was open to all consumers. (Note: European Directive 2003/54/EC of June 26, 2003.) As of July 1, 2007, the French electricity market, encompassing around 450 TWh, became open to competition.

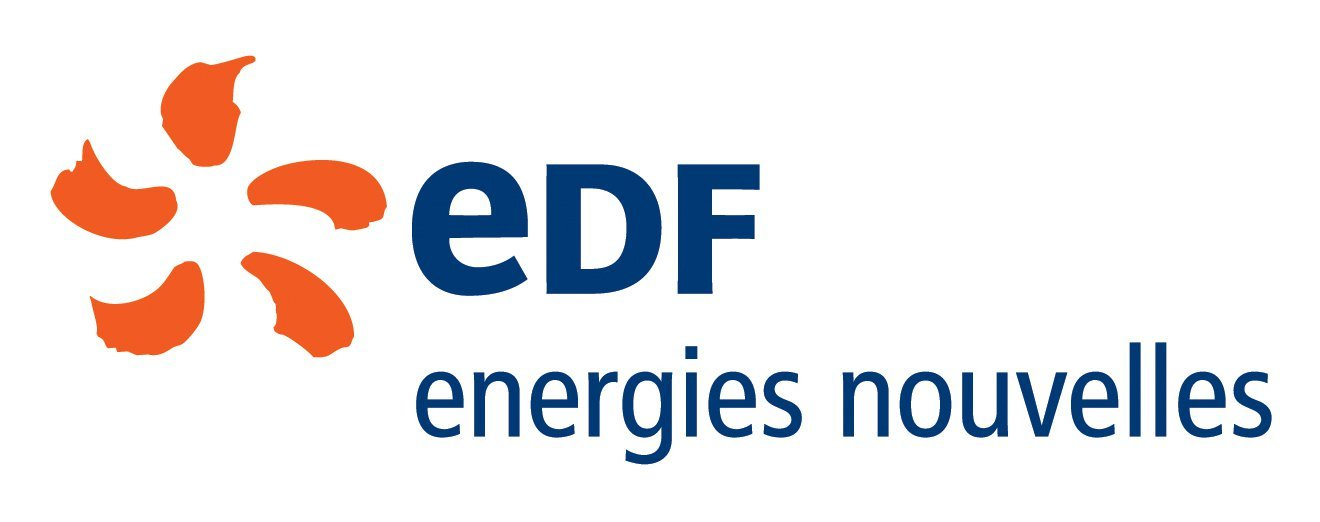
EDF Energy, created in 2002, is the British subsidiary of the French group.

Nevertheless, the French market remains highly consolidated within the European Union, with EDF maintaining an 85% share of the residential customer base in 2017. The law permitted domestic customers to switch to regulated electricity sales tariffs with specific conditions to counteract the steep increase in energy prices since 2004. Additionally, a transitional market adjustment tariff (TaRTAM) was temporarily introduced to assist industrial customers. EDF's ability to revert to the regulated tariff, even when market prices were higher, allowed the company to maintain its dominant position. As a result, the European Commission launched two legal challenges in 2006 and 2007, disputing the French system of regulated tariffs for its constraint on competition. To comply with this mandate, on July 1, 2011, EDF, the proprietor of France's nuclear power plants, was compelled under the French Electricity Market Organization Act (loi NOME) to vend a maximum of 100 TWh of electricity each year from its reactors to rivals, at terms that accurately reflect the economic circumstances of electricity production. These conditions are evaluated by the French Commission de régulation de l'énergie (CRE) and established through the mechanism of regulated access to historic nuclear electricity (ARENH).

The liberalization of the French energy market led to a change in the status of incumbent operators, EDF and Gaz de France (GDF). The Law passed on August 9, 2004, for the public electricity service as well as electricity and gas organizations, which converted them from public entities into limited companies while implementing EU commitments into French law. The French State, through the Agence des participations de l'État, continues to be the majority shareholder in these companies. However, this new designation authorizes them to conduct business in the European market. In 2008, GDF-Suez acquired Belgium's seven nuclear reactors by buying Electrabel. The next year, EDF Energy acquired 16 of the UK's nuclear reactors by purchasing British Energy. Since the UK's AGR reactors are approaching the end of their lifespan, the UK subsidiary of the French utility proposed constructing pairs of EPR reactors at the Hinkley Point and Sizewell locations to replace them.

From 2014, General Electric, the American conglomerate, sought acquisition of Alstom Power and Alstom Grid. These were subsidiaries of the Belfort-based company, which specialized in the production of the Arabelle turbine. Due to the strategic importance of the activities, the buyout required authorization from the French state. It was granted on November 4, 2014, by Emmanuel Macron, the Minister of Economy, Industry, and the Digital Economy. In 2020, General Electric pursued liquidity by selling assets, including the ex-Alstom nuclear activities. EDF ultimately bought GE's turbine production business, now called GE Steam Power, with the announcement made in February 2022.

=== Areva, rise and fall ===
Between 2001 and 2018, French nuclear cycle and reactor design companies were grouped under the Areva banner.

"One of our group's great strengths is its integrated model, i.e. its ability to be present across the entire nuclear cycle, from mining to recycling".

— Anne Lauvergeon, CEO of Areva, May 18, 2009.

The nuclear industry underwent restructuring to enhance French competitiveness and facilitate international alliances for Framatome. Cogema assumed the role of Framatome's primary shareholder in 1999. (Note: At the time, Cogema held 34% of Framatome's capital, the French state 20%, CEA-Industrie around 20%, EDF around 10% and Alcatel just under 10%.) By 2001, the merger between Germany's Siemens and Framatome, which had been in the works since the late 1980s, culminated in the establishment of a joint venture, Framatome ANP (Advanced Nuclear Power), with Framatome holding a 66% ownership stake and Siemens holding a 34% stake. This company is currently the global leader in nuclear boiler construction, representing 21% of the installed base. Additionally, the company provides services to installed plants and holds a 41% share of the global nuclear fuel market.

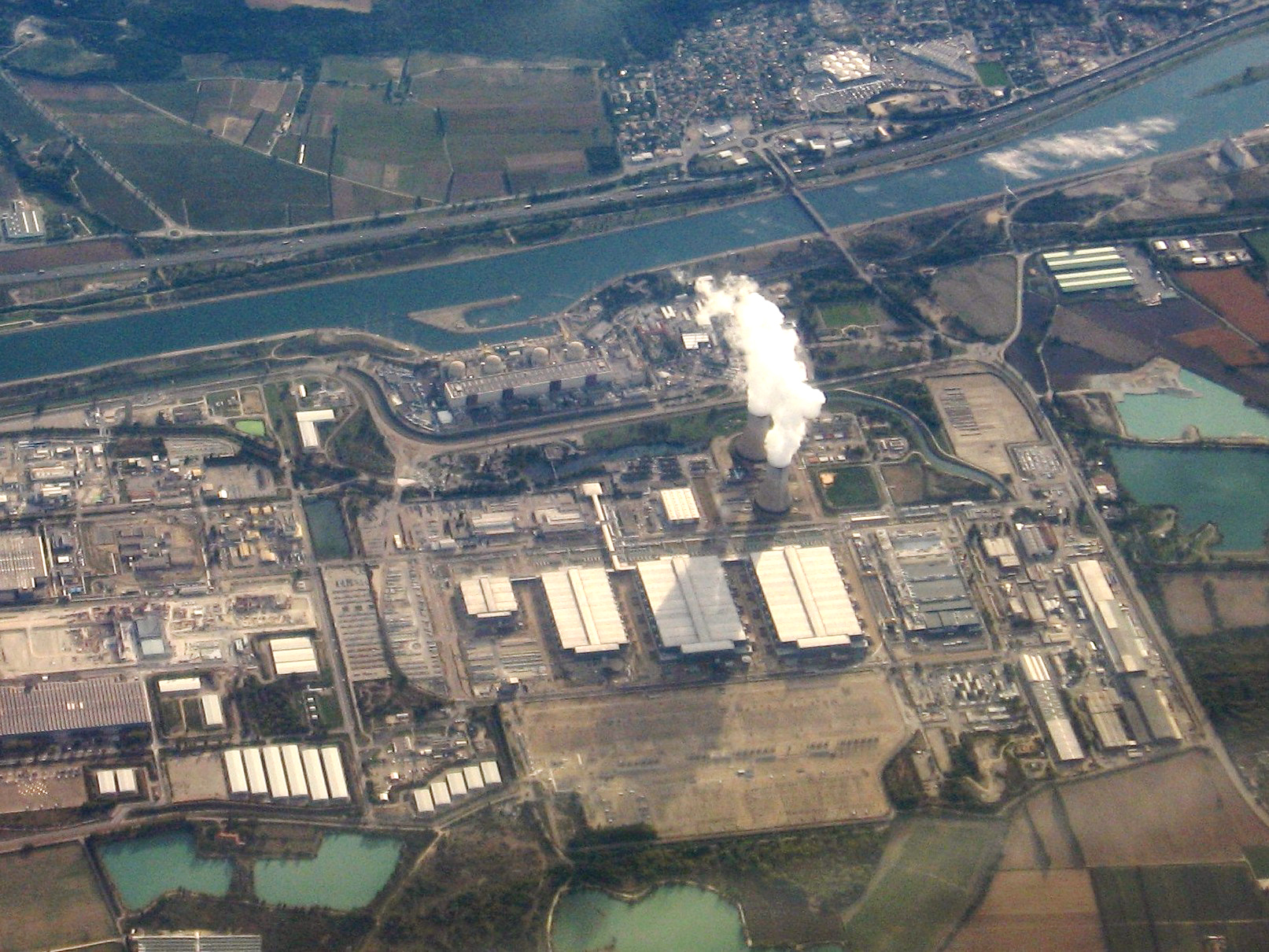
The Tricastin site in 2009. In the center, the Eurodif enrichment plant.

In June 2001, a new company named Topco emerged from CEA Industrie, which was later renamed as Areva in September. It consisted of Cogema, Framatome ANP, Technicatome, and holdings in the new technologies sector such as FCI and ST-Microelectronics. The objective of this new French powerhouse was to reinforce its nuclear division, for which it adopted a new shareholding structure. A significant step towards this goal was taken on November 24, 2003, when it signed an agreement with its British competitor, Urenco, enabling it to access gas centrifuge technology. This proven uranium enrichment method was chosen over the alternative Chemex and AVLIS processes developed by CEA for the Georges-Besse II facility. Following four years of construction, the first cascade at the new Tricastin facility was launched on May 18, 2009. In 2012, it permanently replaced its predecessor, Eurodif, which consumed excessive electricity. As a solution to the global warming issue and the third oil crisis, the reorganized nuclear industry was optimistic about the future, even referring to it as a "nuclear renaissance". During this period, Areva recorded increasing profits from 2002 to 2010 and raised its investments. Especially in renewable energies, with procurement in wind and solar power as early as 2005, and in mining, with the acquisition of three African uranium deposits in 2007. In the meantime, all of the Group's leading subsidiaries have adopted the Areva trade name. Cogema is now Areva NC, Framatome ANP is now Areva NP, and Technicatome is now called Areva TA.

During the 2000s, Areva became the premier global nuclear power company and the only one that fully integrates the industry. However, the Finnish EPR project's added expense, the UraMin affair, the consequences of the Fukushima disaster, the failure to embrace renewable energies, and increased international competition all impacted the French group's finances, resulting in a loss exceeding 10 billion euros between 2011 and 2016. To salvage the state-owned company, the French government demanded its division and EDF's acquisition of the reactor construction business (Areva NP) on July 28, 2015. Thus, on March 30, 2017, Areva divested the majority of its stake in Areva TA, which subsequently changed its name to TechnicAtome and is now 50% owned by the Agence des participations de l'État. In July of the same year, the French government infused 4.5 billion euros into Areva. Of this sum, 2 billion went to AREVA S. A., which focuses on the group's riskiest assets, including the Olkiluoto EPR. The remaining 2.5 billion went to New Areva, a newly formed subsidiary tasked with consolidating fuel cycle activities. EDF, impacted by setbacks to the French EPR, obtains 3 billion euros from the French government and assumes ownership of Areva NP, rebranding it as Framatome. During January 2018, New Areva is renamed Orano, achieving the full dissolution of the organization.

=== EPR construction sites ===
"The construction of the Flamanville EPR [...] can only be considered a failure for EDF."

— Jean-Martin Folz, Report to the Ministry of the Economy and Finance, October 28, 2019.

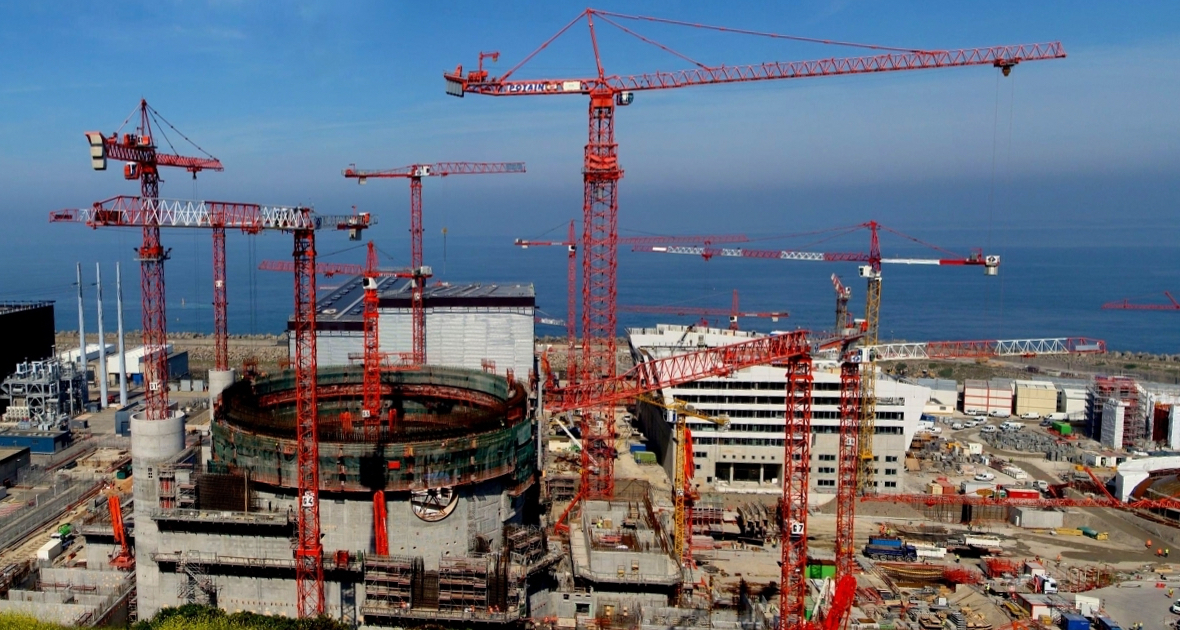
Flamanville EPR construction site, 2010.

In December 2003, Siemens convinced TVO, the Finnish utility, to select the EPR, a third-generation reactor they had co-developed, for the extension of its Olkiluoto nuclear power plant. Although work began in February 2005, it was delayed due to the fact that the turnkey reactor was a prototype. It was only in the following year that EDF decided to build a "production demonstrator" of the EPR at the Flamanville nuclear power plant in France. After the decision was made, a public debate ensued, (Note: In accordance with the law on local democracy of February 27, 2002.) during which anti-nuclear advocates criticized the fact that the choice had already been made. The bill authorizing the construction of the EPR had passed on June 23, 2005, over three months before the start of the debate. A year later, construction began with a budget of 3.3 billion euros and a completion date set for 2012. However, by July 2009, the project was already two years behind schedule. The cost of constructing the third reactor at Flamanville underwent several upward revisions, from 5 billion euros in 2010 to 6 billion euros in 2011, 8.5 billion euros in 2012 and 10.9 billion euros in 2018. Ultimately, the Normandy EPR's completion was delayed until 2023 at a staggering cost of 12.4 billion euros, which was almost four times the planned expenditure and a decade overdue. In China, where Areva was granted an €8 billion contract for two EPRs in Taishan in 2007, construction is currently behind schedule and over budget but to a lesser extent than in prior years. The initial Chinese EPR commenced operation on June 6, 2018, prior to its Finnish and French peers, whose building had initiated four and three years earlier correspondingly.

In January 2009, the French government selected Penly as the location for the construction of France's second EPR. The project will be headed by a consortium consisting of EDF (majority shareholder), GDF Suez, Total, Enel, and E.ON. A public debate taking place between March 24 and July 24, 2010, ended in a stalemate two months later. Supporters of the project were convinced of its necessity, while opponents remained steadfastly opposed. The project was halted in July 2012 after Francois Hollande was elected as the president of the French Republic. However, in 2019, EDF resumed the project by launching a call for bids to construct two EPRs on the site.

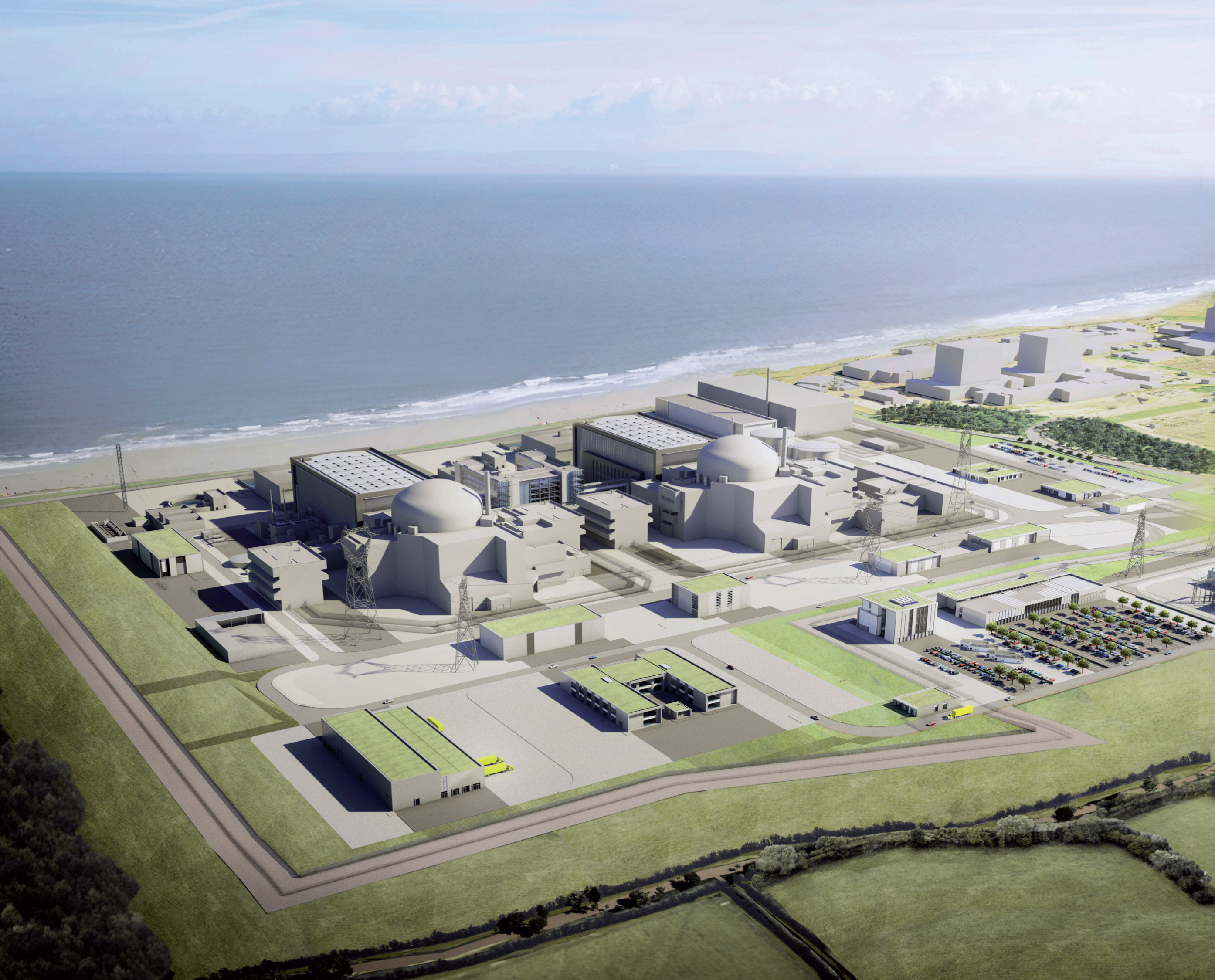
Artist's view of the two Hinkley Point EPRs.

François Roussely's report on the future of the French nuclear industry, published on June 16, 2010, revealed that the prospects for French nuclear power plants with a lifespan of over 40, let alone 50 years, rested primarily on exports in the medium-term. Areva, having taken lessons from the EPR's challenges and aligning with the foreign market, proposed reactors that were smaller in capacity. One of the nuclear reactors, Atmea1, which was co-developed with Mitsubishi Heavy Industries since 2007, was offered in 2010 by GDF Suez for installation at the Marcoule or Tricastin nuclear sites. EDF had a negative perception of Areva, its supplier, for collaborating with competitors to compete directly with EDF on domestic and international markets. This is because, during the same time, the French utility was developing a new reactor with its Guangdong counterpart, CGNPC, to replace the CPR-1000. The competition between the two French government-controlled organizations resulted in the termination of these initiatives. Nonetheless, despite the fact that China independently developed its third-generation reactor (Hualong-1), it worked with EDF on building two EPRs at Hinkley Point.

=== Exporting the plutonium cycle ===
The French fuel cycle industry has gained global recognition for exporting their technology and forming partnerships since the 1950s, more so than in reactor construction.

In 1973, the Pakistani government sought the expertise of Saint-Gobain Nucléaire (SGN) to establish a fuel reprocessing facility at Chashma, with a capacity of 100 tons per year. The hope was that France, which refused to sign the Non-Proliferation Treaty, would not require the facility to be placed under international supervision. The contract was executed in October 1974. However, the explosion of India's inaugural A-bomb emphasized the need for export monitoring. In response to Paris's persistence, Islamabad consented in March 1976 to place the establishment under international observation, until pressure from the United States and the Shah of Iran ultimately terminated the project in 1978.

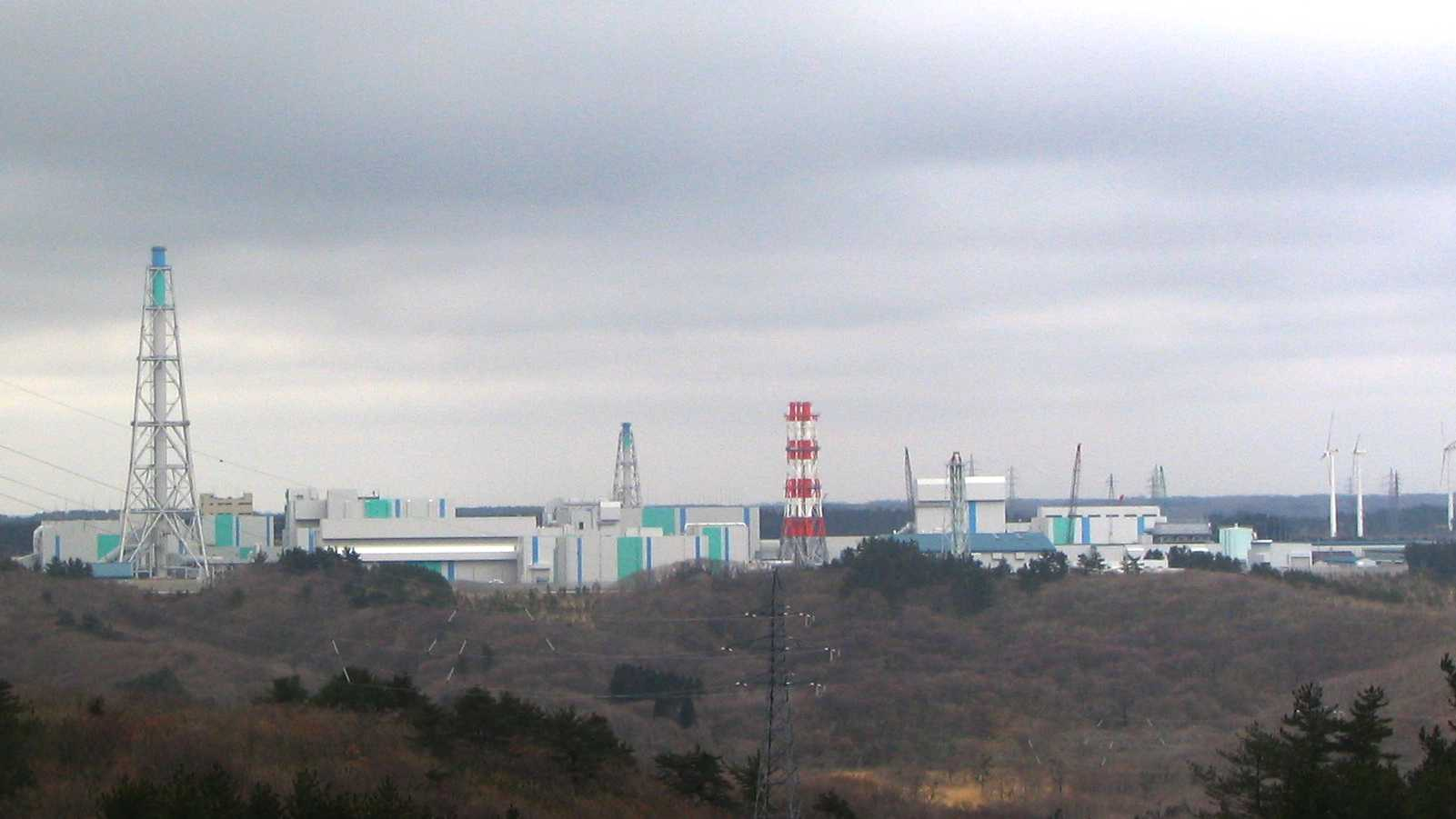
The Rokkasho nuclear plant, La Hague's little sister.

In 1977, with the United States declining to export their technology, Japan approached SGN to construct a test reprocessing plant in Tōkai. The plant had a yearly capacity of 200 tonnes. A decade after, France agreed to a technology transfer deal to build a significantly bigger reprocessing plant in northern Japan. The latter was modeled on the UP3 unit located in La Hague. The construction commenced in 1993, and the first spent fuel bundles arrived in 1998 for storage. Despite a threefold increase in costs and multiple delays, the Rokkasho nuclear plant is set to commence processing stored fuel in 2022. A MOx fabrication unit, being constructed since 2010, will be installed at the complex. Meanwhile, since 1999 France has been producing this fuel for Japan at Marcoule by reprocessing Japanese spent fuel it has recycled at La Hague since 1982.

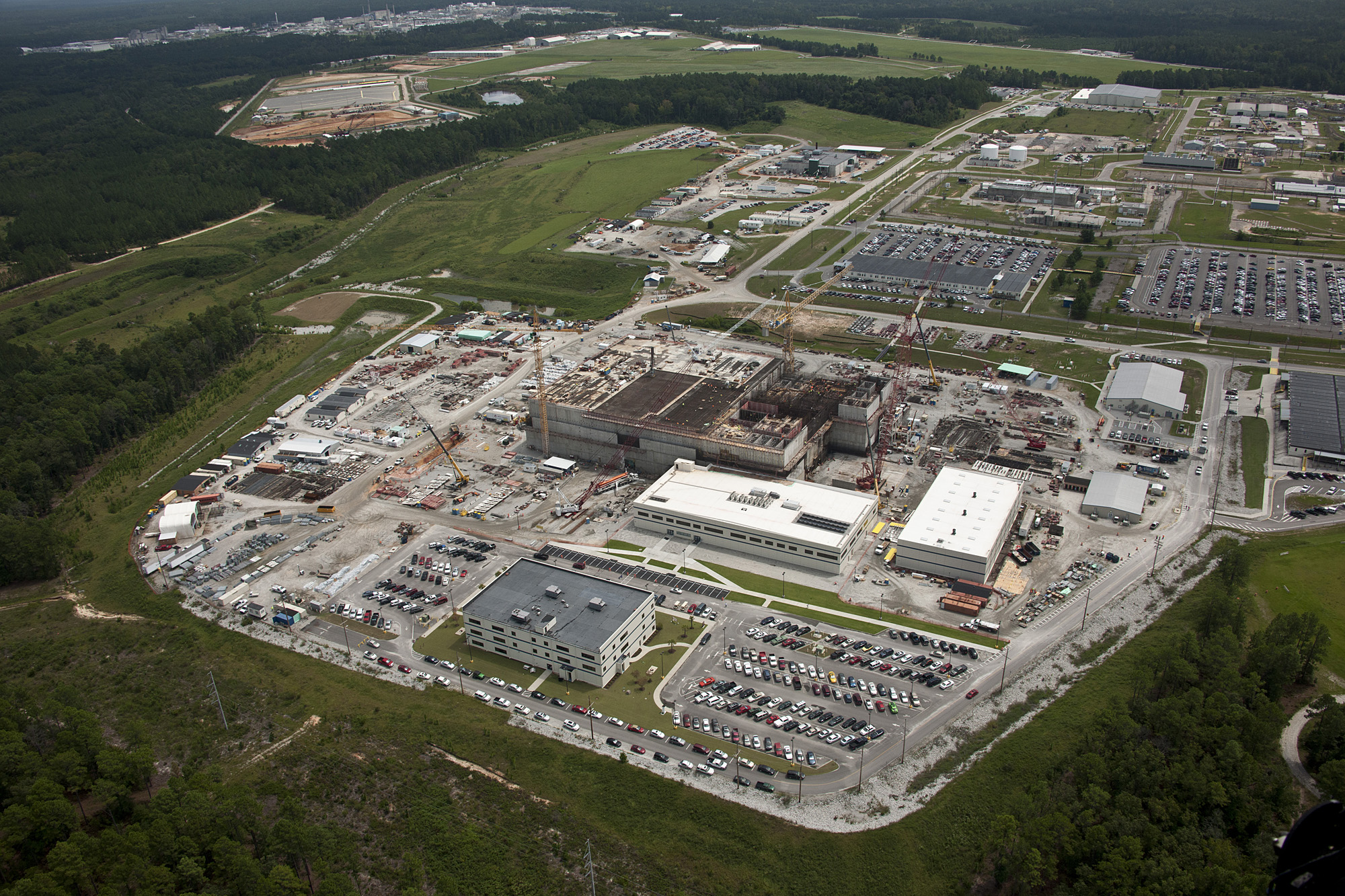
The American twin of the Melox plant, under construction, 2012.

With MOx, Areva aims to make the plutonium industry its international economic spearhead. Since the end of the Cold War, France has been involved in the development of a process for disposing of military plutonium from the dismantling of the arsenals of the two great powers. This was demonstrated in Russia, with the Aida I (Franco-Russian) and Aida-Mox II (Franco-German-Russian) study programs from 1992 to 2002, and in the United States with the MOx for Peace program. The successful conversion of US military plutonium into MOx at Marcoule in 2005 launched Areva's construction of a specialized plant at the Savannah River nuclear site two years later. However, due to delays and rising costs, the completion of the Mixed Oxide Fuel Fabrication Facility, a twin of the Melox plant, was abandoned at the end of 2018. Also in the United States, Areva has been involved since 2004 in the decontamination of the Hanford military complex, notably through the construction of the world's largest nuclear waste vitrification plant.

In China, Areva has since 2007 been seeking to conclude an agreement for the construction of a reprocessing plant, similar to the UP3 unit at La Hague, together with an MOx fabrication unit. China National Nuclear Corporation (CNNC), for its part, is trying to acquire a stake in its French counterpart.

=== Aftermath of the Fukushima accident ===
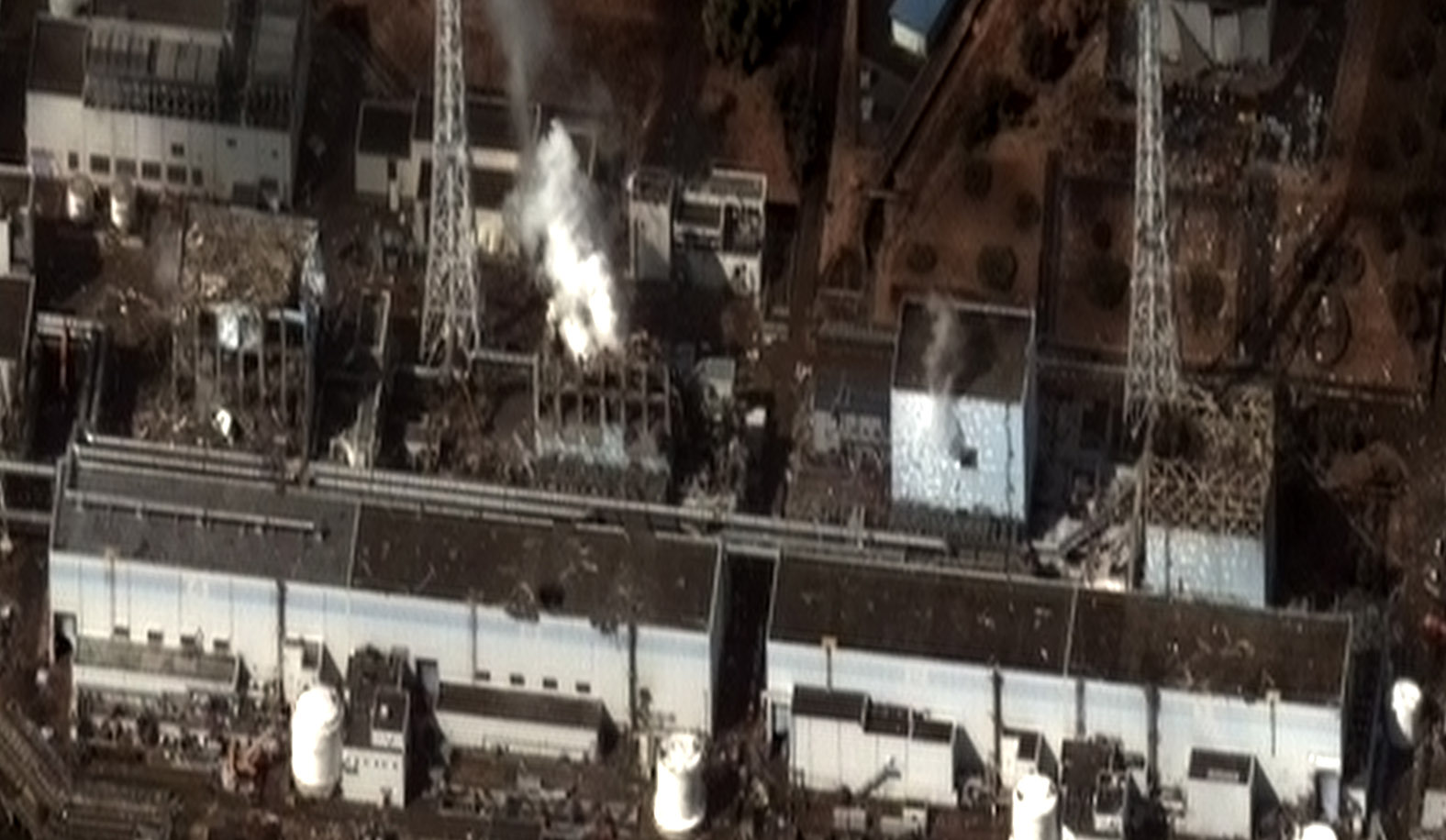
Severely damaged reactor buildings at the Fukushima Daiichi Nuclear Power Plant, 2011.

"France's nuclear policy is one of France's assets, we mustn't touch it."

— Nicolas Sarkozy, President of the Republic, February 9, 2012.

After Chernobyl, another incident has sparked concerns about nuclear power, impeding the industry's recovery. On March 11, 2011, a magnitude 9 earthquake triggered a tsunami that ravaged the Tōhoku region on Pacific coast of Japan, and resulted in the Fukushima nuclear disaster. Failure to cool down the shut-down reactors at the Fukushima Daiichi power plant led to core meltdowns in three of them, resulting in substantial radioactive releases and the evacuation of more than 150,000 people.

Prime Minister François Fillon appointed the Autorité de Sûreté Nucléaire (ASN) on March 23, 2011, to conduct an audit of French nuclear facilities. The audit evaluated the risks of flooding, earthquakes, loss of power, and cooling systems, as well as the operational management of accident situations. ASN, which was established in 2006, is responsible for ensuring nuclear safety and radiation protection in France. At the conclusion of the audit on January 3, 2012, the ASN suggested strengthening site security by adding emergency generators, bunkerized crisis management facilities, and enhancing subcontractor monitoring. Consequently, the increased surveillance exposed several production irregularities at Areva's Le Creusot plant, which manufactures nuclear island components. This led to the shutdown of 18 reactors in 2016 for inspection.

Since the Fukushima disaster, EDF has been investing 3.7 billion euros annually, totaling 55 billion euros by 2025, to upgrade and maintain their power plants to meet the tightened ASN standards and extend their operating life to 50 or 60 years. This initiative, called the "Grand Carénage" program, is estimated by the French Court of Accounts to cost 75 billion by 2030, which will be further compounded by 25 billion in operating expenses. Extending the reactors' lifespan would allow the French utility to allocate the necessary funds to finance their dismantling, which may surpass 100 billion euros.

== Relaunch of a nuclear program ==
=== Prospects for nuclear power plants in 2020 ===
In August 2015, the French Energy Transition Act provided for a cap of 63 GW on installed capacity and 50% on the share of nuclear power in national electricity production by 2025. This deadline was pushed back to 2035 three years later. Électricité de France (EDF) considers that maintaining this capacity would require the construction of new reactors between now and 2030, to compensate for the concomitant closure of older ones. For the second stage of fleet renewal, after the EPRs, fourth-generation reactors, currently under development, would be deployed, pending fusion.

==== Energetic transition ====
To reduce the cost of electricity production while incorporating input from existing EPR reactors, researchers are examining a new streamlined design known as the EPR-NM, later designated as EPR2. EDF projected in late 2015 that its nuclear fleet would consist of 30 to 40 of these reactors by 2050, replacing the then-operational 58. To maintain French nuclear expertise in the absence of new exports, a 2018 report called for the construction of six reactors beginning in 2025. (Note: Report classified as a defence secret and prepared, at the request of the Ministers of the Economy and Ecology, by Yannick d'Escatha and Laurent Collet-Billon.) EDF estimates the project to cost 46 billion euros for a duration of 20 years.

A significant aspect of nuclear industry development involves adjusting power plant output to enable the incorporation of intermittent renewable energies into the electricity grid, thereby participating in the energy transition.

Emmanuel Macron announced in November 2018, the Fessenheim nuclear power plant's closure would commence in 2020, as sanctioned in April 2017. The initial reactor was set to shut down on February 22, and the second one on June 29. The French government has agreed to compensate EDF for the loss of revenue that resulted from the early closure of the power plant, which was formerly scheduled to operate until 2041. In January 2020, an Information Mission was introduced in the French National Assembly regarding the "Closing of the Fessenheim Nuclear Power Plant".

In 2019, as part of the first multi-year energy program, the government announced the closure of an additional 12 reactors between 2027 and 2035, which will be designated by EDF. On January 21, 2020, EDF proposed to study the closure of reactor pairs at seven sites: Bugey (CP0), Tricastin, Gravelines, Dampierre, Blayais (CP1), Chinon and Cruas (CP2). As all of these nuclear power plants have at least four reactors, this solution would enable the utility to avoid closures at these respective sites. At this time, the French government has no intention of providing compensation to EDF for the revenue lost from the premature shutdown of the reactors in question. This decision is based on the fact that all the reactors would have already reached their 50-year depreciation period.

=== The decision, in 2022, to relaunch a nuclear program ===
President Macron announced on February 10, 2022, his decision to "prolong the usage period of all nuclear reactors [as much as possible] [...] and initiate a new reactor program today" which includes six EPR2s now and potentially eight additional reactors in the future. Despite the addition of 14 extra EPR reactors and the extension of the lifespan of current reactors, the contribution of nuclear power to the French electricity mix is expected to decrease from 70% in 2021 to 40% by 2050.

Under France's new energy strategy, the construction of the first of six EPR2 reactors will commence in 2028, with commissioning planned for 2035. The National Commission for Public Debate (Commission nationale du débat public) will be consulted on the project from the second half of 2022. As part of France 2030, the Head of State has announced a $1 billion program to develop new types of reactors to add 25 GW of production capacity by 2050. Half of the $500 million will fund the Nuward project, which will focus on small, modular reactors led by EDF. The first prototype is scheduled for release in 2030. The remaining $250 million will be used to advance the development of innovative reactors that generate less waste.

In September 2022, the CEO of the Électricité de France group, Jean-Bernard Lévy, questioned the government's strategy, citing that his own approach is guided by the law that reduces the use of nuclear power in the electricity mix to 50%. He clarifies that he hired employees to shut down twelve power plants, not to construct new ones. He made these statements during a period of 32 reactor closures and historically low availability of EDF, which worsened the energy crisis in the country. Shortly after, Emmanuel Macron vehemently criticized Jean-Bernard Lévy's comments and upheld his administration's nuclear strategy, specifically the shutdown of the Fessenheim facility.

In August 2022, 32 of the 56 reactors were deactivated, 12 due to corrosion issues and 18 for maintenance purposes. Normally, yearly maintenance is focused on the summer season. However, the French nuclear safety authority (Autorité de sûreté nucléaire) asked for schedule extensions to refurbish the facilities and elongate the reactors' lifespan beyond the 40-year mark, for at least ten more years of use. Furthermore, an unforeseen issue of corrosion on forged stainless steel has been discovered, posing a threat to the safety injection pipes utilized for cooling down the reactor during an accident. To address this problem, EDF has initiated an ultrasonic crack detection program aimed at resolving the matter by 2025.

== Dismantling old power plants ==
Nuclear decommissioning is an area where France has been cultivating its proficiency since the late 1980s, given the magnitude and diversity of national facilities involved. These consist of nine UNGG reactors, whose decommissioning faces the utmost hurdle of irradiated graphite core, a distinct heavy water reactor (Brennilis), and three fast neutron reactors (Rapsodie, Phénix, Superphenix), that mandate the adoption of novel techniques for sodium handling. Dismantling entails decommissioning the initial fuel cycle facilities, including the UP1 reprocessing plant in Marcoule, the UP2 plant in La Hague, and the Eurodif enrichment plant in Tricastin. The aforementioned scope encompasses two entire CEA centers located in Grenoble and Fontenay-aux-Roses, in addition to the Commissariat's research reactors (Ulysse and Phébus).

It is expected that all pressurized water reactors (PWRs) constructed between 1977 and 1999 under the Messmer plan will be deactivated by 2050. This process was scheduled to start with the Fessenheim nuclear power plant in 2020. Fessenheim will serve as a model for future PWRs, but it will not be the first PWR dismantled in France. The distinction of being the first will go to the Franco-Belgian Chooz A reactor, which was shut down in 1991 and will undergo dismantlement for 15 years before being awarded the title in 2022.

The French Nuclear Safety Authority (ASN) has recommended the immediate dismantling of the shut-down reactors. However, EDF wishes to delay this for decades until there is a sufficient reduction in the accumulated radioactivity of the nuclear islands to facilitate operations.

== Fourth-generation projects ==
In 2000, the USA launched the Generation IV international forum to establish cooperation in the development of innovative nuclear reactors. Two years later, six major concepts have been selected: three are thermal (slow) neutron reactors and three are fast neutron reactors. France, which had just shut down the Superphénix fast reactor, turned to high-temperature prismatic reactor technology with the Antares program (Areva New Technology base on Advanced gas cooled Reactor for Energy Supply). Framatome had been involved in the development of this type of reactor with General Atomics for 20 years.

In January 2006, President Jacques Chirac decided to launch the design of a prototype for a fourth-generation reactor. Under the impetus of the CEA, capitalizing on its expertise in the field, France returned to sodium-cooled fast-breeder reactors, as the only concept sufficiently mature for a prototype to be built in the medium term. The Astrid (Advanced Sodium Technological Reactor for Industrial) technology demonstrator project got underway. In 2010, at a time when the Phénix research reactor has been shut down for good, Astrid received a €651 million grant as part of the "Investments d'avenir" program. Design studies then begin. In 2014, Japan joined the project, estimated at five billion euros, only to be sidelined four years later when the CEA downsized the project to keep costs down. In early 2019, the research program was renewed, but the construction of a new fast-breeder reactor was abandoned in the absence of a competitive uranium price.

With the abandonment of Astrid, the CEA turned its attention to Small Modular Reactors (SMR) with the research program Initiatives Usine Nucléaire du Futur, in partnership with EDF and Framatome. In 1981, CEA and EDF had already collaborated on the design of the NP-300, a 300 MWe modular reactor derived from the K15 naval reactors. The Nuward small modular pressurized water reactor also drew on expertise acquired with naval reactors. Framatome is also developing another high-temperature gas SMR in collaboration with General Atomics.

=== Fusion research ===
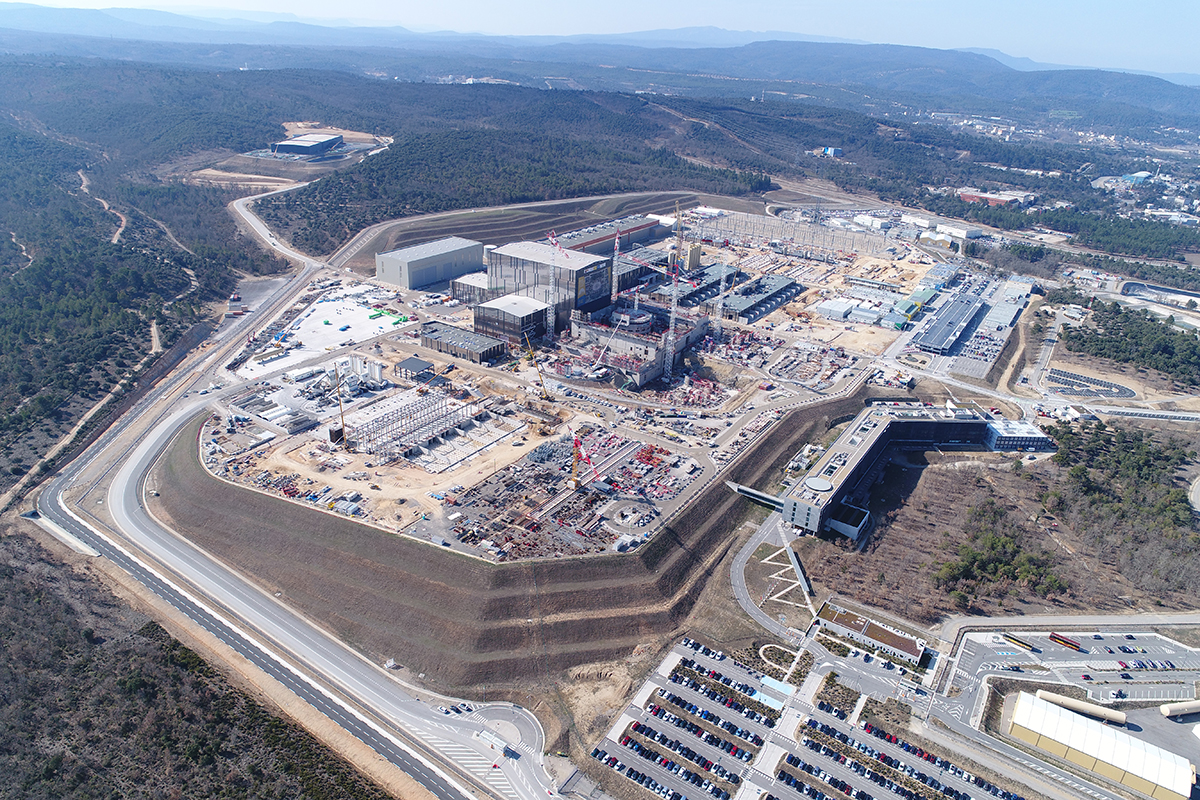
ITER construction site at Cadarache, 2018.

France's efforts to develop nuclear fusion technology began in 1957 with the construction of the Tore TA 2000 facility in Fontenay-aux-Roses. While the project was initially shrouded in secrecy, civil engineering work became public in 1958 following the Atoms for Peace Conference. The remarkable strides made by the Soviet Union in this field, revealed in the late 1960s, had a lasting impact on future research, leading towards tokamak technology. The Fontenay-aux-Roses tokamak (TFR) was the first of its kind in France and began operation on March 22, 1973. It was the world's most powerful tokamak at the time. Following TFR, the Tore Supra started operating at Cadarache in April 1988. Additionally, France is a collaborator in the Joint European Torus (JET) located in England since 1983.

On June 28, 2005, Cadarache was chosen as the host for the international ITER tokamak. Under construction since 2007, ITER aims to demonstrate the technical capability of a reactor capable of producing ten times more power than it consumes over realistic timeframes, with the goal of paving the way for an industrial prototype (Demo).

== See also ==
- fr:Histoire du programme nucléaire militaire de la France
- Energy in France
- Nuclear power debate
- Nuclear power in France
- fr:Exploitation de l'uranium en France
- Force de dissuasion
- fr:Centrale nucléaire en France
- Uranium mining in France

== Bibliography ==
=== Articles ===
- ^{(fr)} Jacques Blanc, "Les mines et les mineurs français d'uranium de 1945 à 1975", UARGA, 2009 (read online archive).
- ^{(fr)} Sezin Topçu, "Les physiciens dans le mouvement antinucléaire: entre science, expertise et politique", Cahiers d'histoire, no 102, 2007, p. 89-108 (read online archive).
- ^{(fr)} Alain Mallevre, "L'Histoire de l'énergie nucléaire en France de 1895 à nos jours", L'écho du Grand Rué, Association des retraités du CEA, no 133, 2006 (read online archive).
- ^{(fr)} Dominique Mongin, "Aux origines du programme atomique militaire français", Matériaux pour l'histoire de notre temps, vol. 31, no 1, 1993, p. 13-21 (read online archive)

=== Publications ===
- ^{(fr)} Jean Songe, Ma vie atomique, Éditions Calmant-Lévy, 2016, 320 p. ISBN 978-2-7021-5640-7.
- ^{(fr)} Yves Lenoir, La comédie atomique. L'histoire occultée des dangers des radiations, La Découverte, 2016 ISBN 978-2-7071-8844-1.
- ^{(fr)} Nicole Colas-Linhart and Anne Petiet, La saga nucléaire: Témoignages d'acteurs, L'Harmattan, 2015, 251 p. ISBN 978-2-343-06538-0.
- ^{(fr)} Robert Belot, L'Atome et la France: Aux origines de la technoscience française, Odile Jacob, 2015, 332 p. ISBN 978-2-7381-3346-5, read online (archive).
- ^{(fr)} Sophie Bretesché and Bernd Grambow, Le nucléaire au prisme du temps, Presses des Mines, 2014, 118 p. ISBN 978-2-35671-133-5.
- ^{(fr)} Boris Dänzer-Kantof and Félix Torres, L'Énergie de la France. De Zoé aux EPR, l'histoire du programme nucléaire, Éditions François Bourin, 2013, 703 p. ISBN 978-2-84941-213-8.
- ^{(fr)} Sezin Topçu, La France nucléaire: L'art de gouverner une technologie contestée, Éditions du Seuil, 2013, 350 p. ISBN 978-2-02-105270-1.
- ^{(fr)} Raphaël Granvaud, Areva en Afrique: Une face cachée du nucléaire français, Coédition Agone, coll. "Dossiers Noirs", 2012, 300 p. ISBN 978-2-7489-0156-6.
- ^{(fr)} Cour des comptes, Les coûts de la filière électronucléaire, Paris, January 27, 2012, 430 p. (read online archive).
- ^{(fr)} Bruno Tertrais, Le marché noir de la bombe, Éditions Buchet/Chastel, 2009, 262 p. ISBN 978-2-283-02391-4.
- ^{(fr)} Michel Hug, Un siècle d'énergie nucléaire, Académie des Technologies, coll. "Grandes aventures technologiques françaises", 2009, 86 p. (read online archive).
- ^{(fr)} Paul Reuss, L'épopée de l'énergie nucléaire: une histoire scientifique et industrielle, Paris, EDP Sciences, coll. "Génie atomique", February 8, 2007, 167 p. ISBN 2-86883-880-4, read online (archive).
- ^{(fr)} Philippe Pradel, CEA, Direction de l'énergie nucléaire, L'énergie nucléaire du futur: quelles recherches pour quels objectifs, Paris, Éditions du Moniteur, 2005, 108 p. ISBN 2-281-11307-8, read online (archive).
- ^{(fr)} Bruno Barrillot, Le complexe nucléaire: Des liens entre l'atome civil et l'atome militaire, CDRPC/Observatoire des armes nucléaires françaises, 2005, 144 p. ISBN 2-913374-17-4.
- ^{(fr)} Aude Le Dars, Pour une gestion durable des déchets nucléaires, Paris, Presses Universitaires de France, 2004, 281 p. ISBN 2-13-053938-6.
- ^{(fr)} Gabrielle Hecht, Le rayonnement de la France, Éditions La Découverte, 2004, 455 p. ISBN 978-2-35480-138-0.
- ^{(fr)} Lionel Taccoen, Le pari nucléaire français: Histoire politique des décisions cruciales, L'Harmattan, 2003, 208 p. ISBN 2-7475-3884-2.
- Dominique Finon and Carine Staropoli, The performing interaction between institutions and technology in the French electronuclear industry, Grenoble, October 2000, 26 p. (read online archive).
- ^{(fr)} André Bendjebbar, Histoire secrète de la bombe atomique française, le cherche midi, 2000, 400 p. ISBN 2-86274-794-7.
- ^{(fr)} Michel Dürr, Guide international de l'énergie nucléaire, Paris, Éditions Technip, 1987, 406 p. ISBN 2-7108-0532-4, read online (archive), "L'énergie nucléaire en France", pp. 37–44.
- ^{(fr)} Jean-Claude Debeir, Jean-Paul Deléage and Daniel Hémery, Les servitudes de la puissance, Flammarion, coll. "Nouvelle bibliothèque scientifique", 1986, "Un nucléaire très cartésien", p. 299-342.
- ^{(fr)} François Dorget, Le choix nucléaire français, Paris, Economica, 1984, 345 p. ISBN 978-2-7178-0734-9.
- ^{(fr)} Spencer R. Weart, La grande aventure des atomistes français: Les savants au pouvoir, Fayard, 1980, 394 p. ISBN 2-213-00639-3.

=== Filmography ===
- Kenichi Watanabe, Terres Nucléaires: une histoire du plutonium archive, 2015, documentary, on Dailymotion.
- Nucléaire, exception française archive, 2013, report, on Dailymotion.
- Nicole Le Garrec, Plogoff, des pierres contre des fusils, documentary, 1980.
- France's first atomic power plant archive, 1955, on the INA website.
- Official inauguration of the first French atomic reactor at Fort de Châtillon archive, 1948, on the INA website.

=== External links ===
- The history of nuclear energy in France from 1895 to the present day archive [PDF]
- PLOGOFF. Chronicle of a victory against nuclear power. archive
