= Enriched uranium =

Uranium processed to increase the percentage of uranium-235

Enriched uranium is a type of uranium in which the percent composition of uranium-235 (written ^{235}U) has been increased through the process of isotope separation. Naturally occurring uranium is composed primarily of three isotopes: uranium-238 (^{238}U, 99.2732–99.2752% natural abundance), uranium-235 (^{235}U, 0.7198–0.7210%), and uranium-234 (^{234}U, 0.0049–0.0059%). ^{235}U is the only primordial nuclide present in nature in appreciable quantities that is fissile with thermal neutrons.

Proportions of uranium-238 (blue) and uranium-235 (red) found naturally versus enriched grades

Enriched uranium is used in both civil nuclear power generation and military nuclear weapons. Low-enriched uranium (LEU), containing less than 20% ^{235}U, is used as fuel in light-water reactors, which make up most nuclear power reactors worldwide. Highly enriched uranium (HEU), containing 20% or more ^{235}U, has been used in nuclear weapons, naval propulsion reactors, some research reactors, and certain specialized reactor designs. There are about 2,000 tonnes of highly enriched uranium in the world.

Large-scale enrichment was first developed during the Manhattan Project, which used gaseous diffusion and electromagnetic isotope separation to produce enriched uranium. Historically, gaseous diffusion and the gas centrifuge are the two enrichment methods that have operated on a commercial scale, but gaseous diffusion is now obsolete and has been replaced by centrifuge technology in commercial use. Laser isotope separation has also been developed as a possible third-generation enrichment technology; Global Laser Enrichment has applied to license a laser-based uranium enrichment facility in the United States, but centrifugation remains the enrichment process used commercially.

The ^{238}U remaining after enrichment is known as depleted uranium (DU), and is considerably less radioactive than natural uranium, though still very dense. Depleted uranium is used as a radiation shielding material and in armor-penetrating weapons.

== Grades ==
Uranium as it is taken directly from the Earth is not suitable as fuel for most nuclear reactors and requires additional processes to make it usable (the CANDU design is a notable exception). Uranium is mined either underground or in an open pit depending on the depth at which it is found. After the uranium ore is mined, it must go through a milling process to extract the uranium from the ore.

This is accomplished by a combination of chemical processes with the end product being concentrated uranium oxide, which is known as "yellowcake", contains roughly 80% uranium whereas the original ore typically contains as little as 0.1% uranium.

This yellowcake is further processed to obtain the desired form of uranium suitable for nuclear fuel production. After the milling process is complete, the uranium must next undergo a process of conversion, "to either uranium dioxide, which can be used as the fuel for those types of reactors that do not require enriched uranium, or into uranium hexafluoride, which can be enriched to produce fuel for the majority of types of reactors". Naturally occurring uranium is made of a mixture of ^{235}U and ^{238}U. The ^{235}U is fissile, meaning it is easily split with neutrons while the remainder is ^{238}U, but in nature, more than 99% of the extracted ore is ^{238}U. Most nuclear reactors require enriched uranium, which is uranium with higher concentrations of ^{235}U ranging between 3.5% and 4.5% (although a few reactor designs using a graphite or heavy water moderator, such as the RBMK and CANDU, are capable of operating with natural uranium as fuel). There are two commercial enrichment processes: gaseous diffusion and gas centrifugation. Both enrichment processes involve the use of uranium hexafluoride and produce enriched uranium oxide.

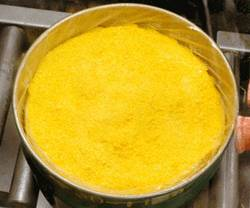
A drum of yellowcake (a mixture of uranium precipitates)

=== Reprocessed uranium (RepU) ===
Reprocessed uranium (RepU) is a product of nuclear fuel cycles involving nuclear reprocessing of spent fuel. RepU recovered from light water reactor (LWR) spent fuel typically contains slightly more ^{235}U than natural uranium, and therefore could be used to fuel reactors that customarily use natural uranium as fuel, such as CANDU reactors. It also contains the undesirable isotope uranium-236, which undergoes neutron capture, wasting neutrons (and requiring higher ^{235}U enrichment) and creating neptunium-237, which would be one of the more mobile and troublesome radionuclides in deep geological repository disposal of nuclear waste.

=== Low-enriched uranium (LEU) ===
Low-enriched uranium (LEU) has a lower than 20% concentration of ^{235}U; for instance, in commercial LWR, the most prevalent power reactors in the world, uranium is enriched to 3 to 5% ^{235}U. Slightly enriched uranium (SEU) has a concentration of under 2% ^{235}U.

=== High-assay LEU (HALEU) ===
High-assay LEU (HALEU) is enriched between 5% and 20% and is called for in many small modular reactor (SMR) designs. Fresh LEU used in research reactors is usually enriched between 12% and 19.75% ^{235}U; the latter concentration is used to replace HEU fuels when converting to LEU.

=== Highly enriched uranium (HEU) ===
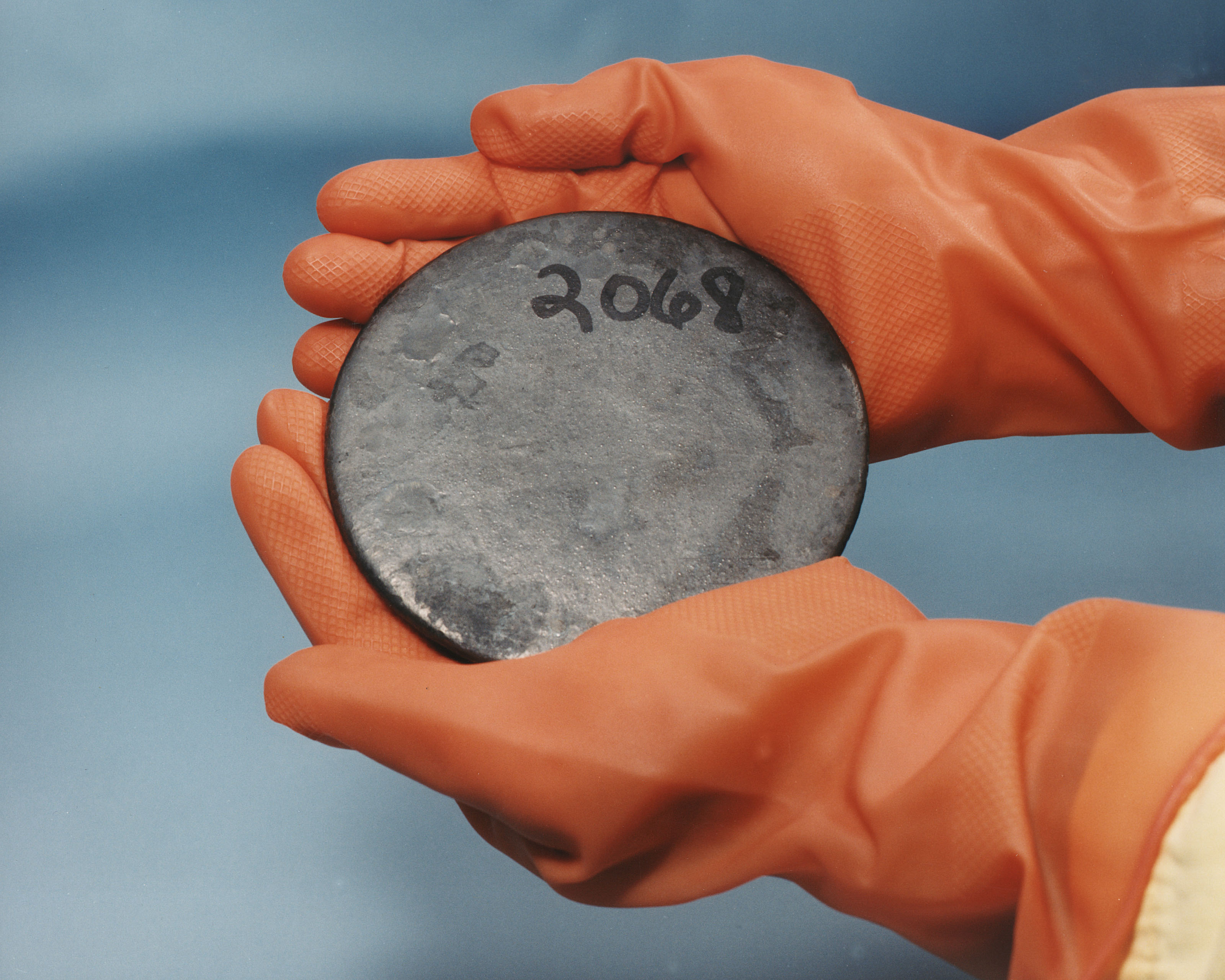
A billet of highly enriched uranium metal

Highly enriched uranium (HEU) has a 20% or higher concentration of ^{235}U. The fissile uranium in nuclear weapon primaries usually contains 85% or more of ^{235}U known as weapons grade, though theoretically for an implosion design, a minimum of 20% could be sufficient (called weapon-usable) although it would require hundreds of kilograms of material and "would not be practical to design"; even lower enrichment is hypothetically possible, but as the enrichment percentage decreases the critical mass for unmoderated fast neutrons rapidly increases, with for example, an infinite mass of 5.4% ^{235}U being required. For criticality experiments, enrichment of uranium to over 97% has been accomplished.

A graph showing the calculated critical masses of uranium (in kilograms, left axis) as a function of the thickness of a beryllium reflector (in centimeters, bottom axis) and U-235 enrichment level (line labels).

The first uranium bomb, Little Boy, dropped by the United States on Hiroshima in 1945, used 64 kilograms (141 lb) of 80% enriched uranium. Wrapping the weapon's fissile core in a neutron reflector (which is standard on all nuclear explosives) can dramatically reduce the critical mass. Because the core was surrounded by a neutron reflector, at explosion it comprised almost 2.5 critical masses. Neutron reflectors, compressing the fissile core via implosion, fusion boosting, and "tamping", which slows the expansion of the fissioning core with inertia, allow nuclear weapon designs that use less than what would be one bare-sphere critical mass at normal density. The presence of too much of the ^{238}U isotope inhibits the runaway nuclear chain reaction that is responsible for the weapon's power. The critical mass for 85% highly enriched uranium is about 50 kilograms (110 lb), which at normal density would be a sphere about 17 centimetres (6.7 in) in diameter. The highly enriched uranium core used in the first Chinese nuclear test, Project 596, weighed about 15 kilograms, corresponding to a diameter of 11.4 cm.

Later U.S. nuclear weapons usually use plutonium-239 in the primary stage, but the jacket or tamper secondary stage, which is compressed by the primary nuclear explosion, often uses HEU with enrichment between 40% and 80% along with the fusion fuel lithium deuteride. For the secondary of a large nuclear weapon, the higher critical mass of less-enriched uranium can be an advantage as it allows the core at explosion time to contain a larger amount of fuel. The ^{238}U is not said to be fissile but still is fissionable by fast neutrons (>2 MeV) such as the ones produced during D–T fusion.

HEU is also used in fast neutron reactors, whose cores require about 20% or more of fissile material, as well as in naval reactors, where it often contains at least 50% ^{235}U, but typically does not exceed 90%. The Fermi-1 commercial fast reactor prototype used HEU with 26.5% ^{235}U. Significant quantities of HEU are used in the production of medical isotopes, for example molybdenum-99 for technetium-99m generators.

== Enrichment methods ==
Isotope separation is difficult because isotopes of the same element have nearly identical chemical properties and differ only slightly in mass. In the case of uranium, ^{235}U is about 1.26% lighter than ^{238}U. Commercial enrichment normally uses uranium hexafluoride (UF_{6}) rather than atomic uranium, which further reduces the relative mass difference between the molecules containing the two isotopes. UF_{6} is used because fluorine has only one naturally occurring isotope and because UF_{6} can be handled as a gas at suitable operating temperatures.

Because each separation step produces only a small change in isotope concentration, enrichment plants use a cascade of many stages. Each stage passes a slightly enriched product stream to the next stage and returns a slightly depleted stream to the previous stage.

Historically, the two uranium enrichment methods that have operated on a commercial scale are gaseous diffusion and the gas centrifuge. Gaseous diffusion was the first commercial enrichment process, but it is energy-intensive and has been replaced by centrifuge technology in commercial use. The last large commercial gaseous diffusion plant, the Paducah Gaseous Diffusion Plant in the United States, ceased enrichment operations in 2013.

In the mid-2020s, commercial uranium enrichment is performed by gas centrifuge plants. Centrifuge enrichment uses UF_{6} gas and separates isotopes by exploiting the small mass difference between molecules containing ^{235}U and ^{238}U. Modern centrifuge plants require far less electricity than gaseous diffusion plants; the World Nuclear Association estimates roughly 40–50 kWh per separative work unit for modern centrifuge plants, compared with about 2,400–2,500 kWh per SWU for gaseous diffusion.

Laser isotope separation has also been investigated as a possible third-generation enrichment technology. One such process, SILEX, is being commercialized by Global Laser Enrichment (GLE). In 2025, GLE submitted a license application for the proposed Paducah Laser Enrichment Facility, and the Nuclear Regulatory Commission accepted the application for detailed review. Laser enrichment has not yet displaced centrifuge enrichment in commercial operation.

=== Diffusion techniques ===
==== Gaseous diffusion ====
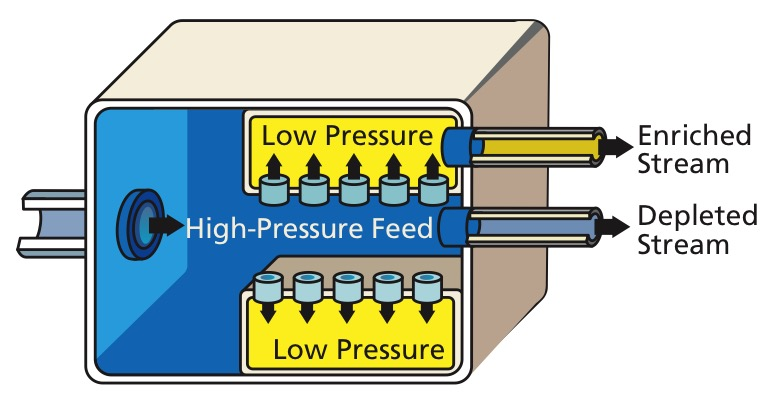
Gaseous diffusion uses semi-permeable membranes to separate enriched uranium

Gaseous diffusion is a technology used to produce enriched uranium by forcing gaseous uranium hexafluoride ('hex') through semi-permeable membranes. This produces a slight separation between the molecules containing ^{235}U and ^{238}U. Throughout the Cold War, gaseous diffusion played a major role as a uranium enrichment technique, and as of 2008 accounted for about 33% of enriched uranium production, but in 2011 was deemed an obsolete technology that is steadily being replaced by the later generations of technology as the diffusion plants reach their ends of life. In 2013, the Paducah facility in the U.S. ceased operating; it was the last commercial ^{235}U gaseous diffusion plant in the world.

==== Thermal diffusion ====
Thermal diffusion uses the transfer of heat across a thin liquid or gas to accomplish isotope separation. The process exploits the fact that the lighter ^{235}U gas molecules will diffuse toward a hot surface, and the heavier ^{238}U gas molecules will diffuse toward a cold surface. At the S-50 plant in Oak Ridge, Tennessee, during World War II, liquid uranium hexafluoride was placed between two concentric vertical pipes, with the inner pipe heated and the outer pipe cooled. This caused lighter 235U molecules to migrate toward the hot inner wall and heavier 238U molecules toward the cold outer wall, with convection currents carrying the enriched uranium upward for collection, and the height of the columns directly influenced the degree of separation. The facility was used to prepare feed material for the Electromagnetic Isotope Separation (EMIS) process but was later abandoned in favor of gaseous diffusion.

=== Centrifuge techniques ===
==== Gas centrifuge ====
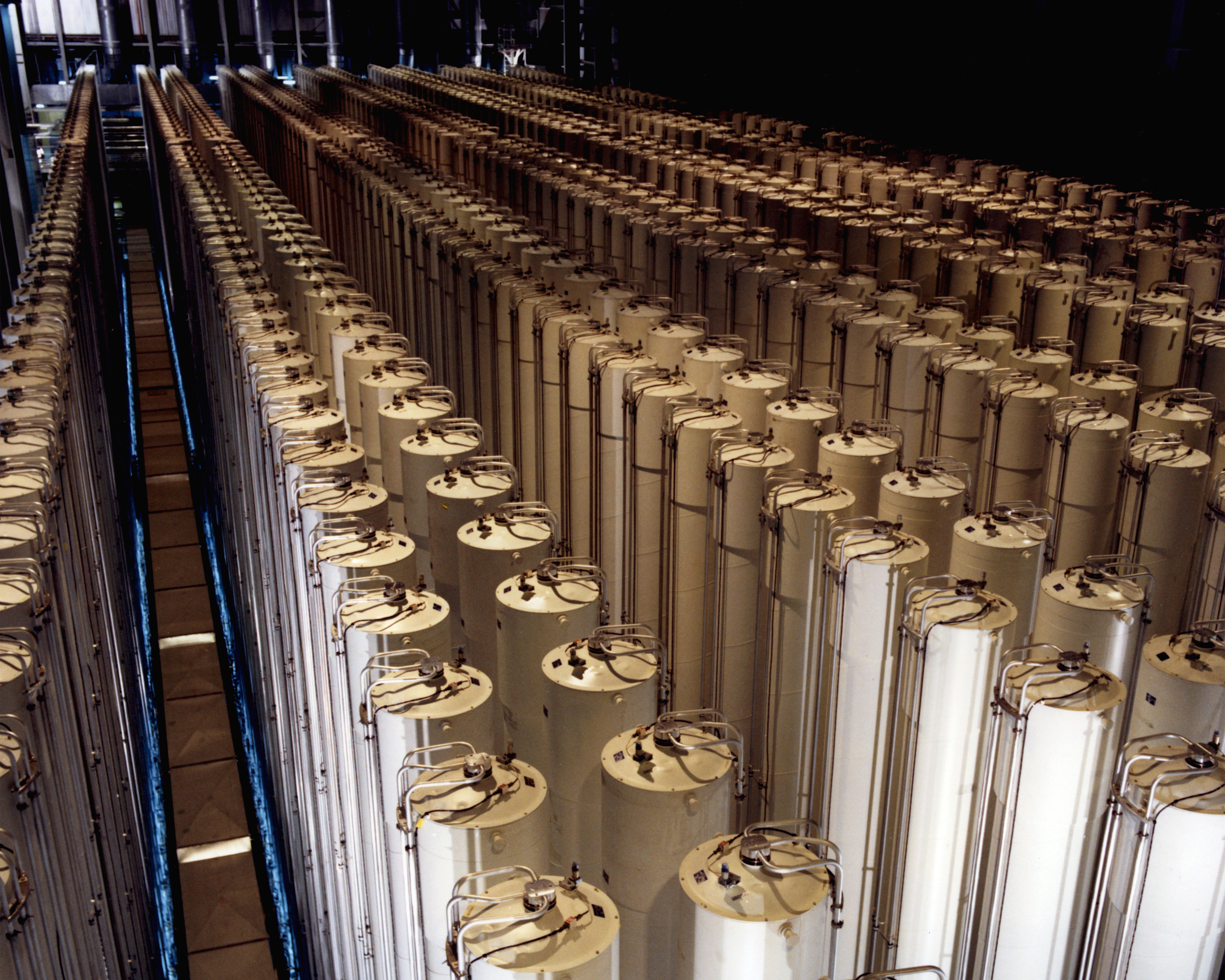
A cascade of gas centrifuges at a U.S. enrichment plant

The gas centrifuge process uses a large number of rotating cylinders in series and parallel formations. Each cylinder's rotation creates a strong centripetal force so that the heavier gas molecules containing ^{238}U move tangentially toward the outside of the cylinder and the lighter gas molecules rich in ^{235}U collect closer to the center. It requires much less energy to achieve the same separation than the older gaseous diffusion process, which it has largely replaced and so is the current method of choice and is termed second generation. It has a separation factor per stage of 1.3 relative to gaseous diffusion of 1.005, which translates to about one-fiftieth of the energy requirements. Gas centrifuge techniques produce close to 100% of the world's enriched uranium. The cost per separative work unit is approximately 100 dollars per Separative Work Units (SWU), making it about 40% cheaper than standard gaseous diffusion techniques.

==== Zippe centrifuge ====
Diagram of the principles of a Zippe-type gas centrifuge with U-238 represented in dark blue and U-235 represented in light blue

The Zippe-type centrifuge is an improvement on the standard gas centrifuge, the primary difference being the use of heat. The bottom of the rotating cylinder is heated, producing convection currents that move the ^{235}U up the cylinder, where it can be collected by scoops. This improved centrifuge design is used commercially by Urenco to produce nuclear fuel and was used by Pakistan in its nuclear weapons program.

=== Laser techniques ===
Laser processes promise lower energy inputs, lower capital costs and lower tails assays, hence significant economic advantages. Several laser processes have been investigated or are under development. Separation of isotopes by laser excitation (SILEX) is well developed and is licensed for commercial operation as of 2012. Separation of isotopes by laser excitation is a very effective and cheap method of uranium separation, able to be done in small facilities requiring much less energy and space than previous separation techniques. The cost of uranium enrichment using laser enrichment technologies is approximately $30 per SWU which is less than a third of the price of gas centrifuges, the current standard of enrichment. Separation of isotopes by laser excitation could be done in facilities virtually undetectable by satellites. More than 20 countries worked with laser separation during the 1990s and 2000s, though all achieved very limited success.

==== Atomic vapor laser isotope separation (AVLIS) ====
Atomic vapor laser isotope separation employs specially tuned lasers to separate isotopes of uranium using selective ionization of hyperfine transitions. The technique uses lasers tuned to frequencies that ionize ^{235}U atoms and no others. The positively charged ^{235}U ions are then attracted to a negatively charged plate and collected.

==== Molecular laser isotope separation (MLIS) ====
Molecular laser isotope separation uses an infrared laser directed at UF_{6}, exciting molecules that contain a ^{235}U atom. A second laser frees a fluorine atom, leaving uranium pentafluoride, which then precipitates out of the gas.

==== Separation of isotopes by laser excitation (SILEX) ====
Separation of isotopes by laser excitation is an Australian development that also uses UF_{6}. After a protracted development process involving U.S. enrichment company USEC acquiring and then relinquishing commercialization rights to the technology, GE Hitachi Nuclear Energy (GEH) signed a commercialization agreement with Silex Systems in 2006. GEH has since built a demonstration test loop and announced plans to build an initial commercial facility. Details of the process are classified and restricted by intergovernmental agreements between United States, Australia, and the commercial entities. SILEX has been projected to be an order of magnitude more efficient than existing production techniques but again, the exact figure is classified. In August 2011 Global Laser Enrichment, a subsidiary of GEH, applied to the U.S. Nuclear Regulatory Commission (NRC) for a permit to build a commercial plant. In September 2012, the NRC issued a license for GEH to build and operate a commercial SILEX enrichment plant, although the company had not yet decided whether the project would be profitable enough to begin construction, and despite concerns that the technology could contribute to nuclear proliferation. The fear of nuclear proliferation arose in part due to laser separation technology requiring less than 25% of the space of typical separation techniques, as well as requiring only the energy that would power 12 typical houses, putting a laser separation plant that works by means of laser excitation well below the detection threshold of existing surveillance technologies. Due to these concerns the American Physical Society filed a petition with the NRC, asking that before any laser excitation plants are built that they undergo a formal review of proliferation risks. The APS even went as far as calling the technology a "game changer" due to the ability for it to be hidden from any type of detection.

The foundational proliferation assessment of this technology was provided by Princeton physicist Ryan Snyder. It includes a detailed analysis of how the technology works and the challenges it presents for detecting clandestine uranium enrichment facilities.

=== Other techniques ===
==== Aerodynamic processes ====
Schematic diagram of an aerodynamic nozzle. Many thousands of these small foils would be combined in an enrichment unit.

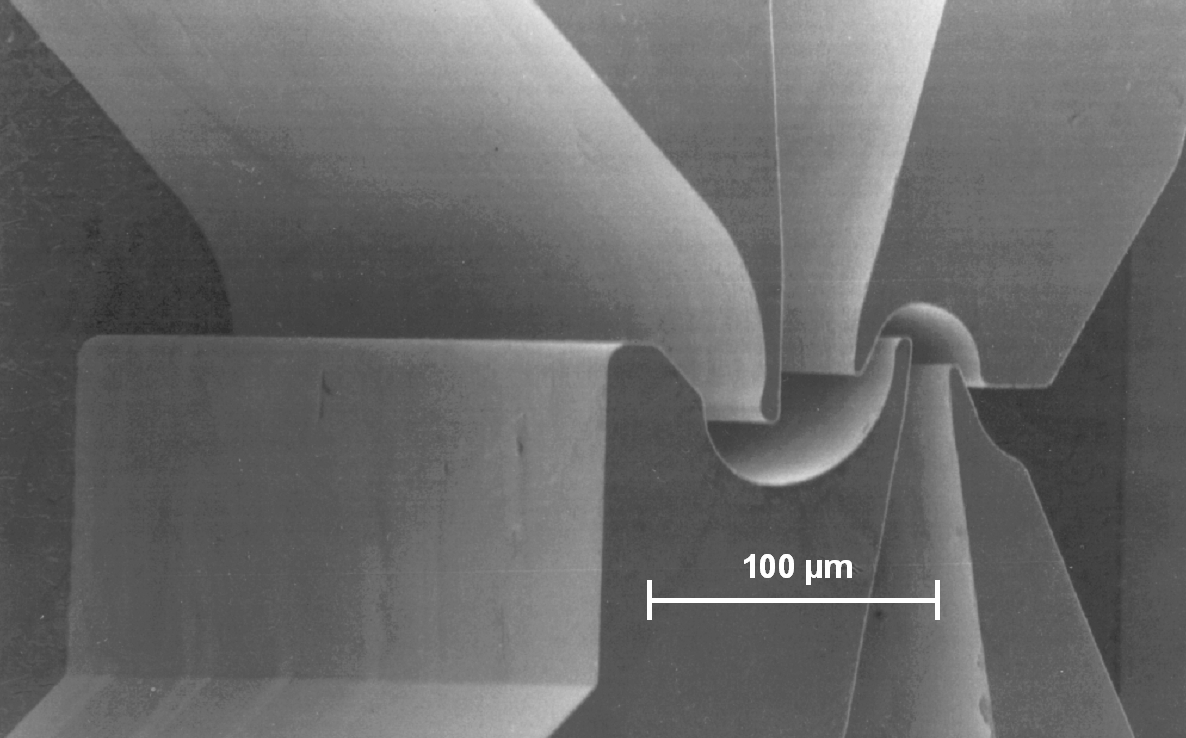
The X-ray-based LIGA manufacturing process was originally developed at the Forschungszentrum Karlsruhe, Germany, to produce nozzles for isotope enrichment.

Aerodynamic enrichment processes include the Becker jet nozzle techniques developed by E. W. Becker and associates using the LIGA process and the vortex tube separation process. These aerodynamic separation processes depend upon diffusion driven by pressure gradients, as does the gas centrifuge. They in general have the disadvantage of requiring complex systems of cascading of individual separating elements to minimize energy consumption. In effect, aerodynamic processes can be considered as non-rotating centrifuges. Enhancement of the centrifugal forces is achieved by dilution of UF_{6} with hydrogen or helium as a carrier gas achieving a much higher flow velocity for the gas than could be obtained using pure uranium hexafluoride. The Uranium Enrichment Corporation of South Africa (UCOR) developed and deployed the continuous Helikon vortex separation cascade for high production rate low-enrichment and the substantially different semi-batch Pelsakon low production rate high enrichment cascade both using a particular vortex tube separator design, and both embodied in industrial plant. A demonstration plant was built in Brazil by NUCLEI, a consortium led by Industrias Nucleares do Brasil that used the separation nozzle process. All methods have high energy consumption and substantial requirements for removal of waste heat; none is currently still in use.

==== Electromagnetic isotope separation ====
Schematic diagram of uranium isotope separation in a calutron shows how a strong magnetic field is used to redirect a stream of uranium ions to a target, resulting in a higher concentration of uranium-235 (represented here in dark blue) in the inner fringes of the stream.

In the electromagnetic isotope separation process (EMIS), metallic uranium is first vaporized, and then ionized to positively charged ions. The cations are then accelerated and subsequently deflected by magnetic fields onto their respective collection targets. A production-scale mass spectrometer named the calutron was developed during World War II that provided some of the ^{235}U used for the Little Boy nuclear bomb, which was dropped over Hiroshima in 1945. Properly the term 'calutron' applies to a multistage device arranged in a large oval around a powerful electromagnet. Electromagnetic isotope separation has been largely abandoned in favour of more effective methods.

==== Chemical methods ====
One chemical process has been demonstrated to pilot plant stage but not used for production. The French CHEMEX process exploited a very slight difference in the two isotopes' propensity to change valency in oxidation/reduction, using immiscible aqueous and organic phases. An ion-exchange process was developed by the Asahi Chemical Company in Japan that applies similar chemistry but effects separation on a proprietary resin ion-exchange column.

==== Plasma separation ====
Plasma separation process (PSP) describes a technique that makes use of superconducting magnets and plasma physics. In this process, the principle of ion cyclotron resonance is used to selectively energize the ^{235}U isotope in a plasma containing a mix of ions. France developed its own version of PSP, which it called RCI. Funding for RCI was drastically reduced in 1986, and the program was suspended around 1990, although RCI is still used for stable isotope separation.

== Separative work unit ==
"Separative work"—the amount of separation done by an enrichment process—is a function of the concentrations of the feedstock, the enriched output, and the depleted tailings; and is expressed in units that are so calculated as to be proportional to the total input (energy / machine operation time) and to the mass processed. Separative work is not energy. The same amount of separative work will require different amounts of energy depending on the efficiency of the separation technology. Separative work is measured in Separative work units SWU, kg SW, or kg UTA (from the German Urantrennarbeit – literally uranium separation work).

- 1 SWU = 1 kg SW = 1 kg UTA
- 1 kSWU = 1 tSW = 1 t UTA
- 1 MSWU = 1 ktSW = 1 kt UTA

== Cost issues ==
In addition to the separative work units provided by an enrichment facility, the other important parameter to be considered is the mass of natural uranium (NU) that is needed to yield a desired mass of enriched uranium. As with the number of SWUs, the amount of feed material required will also depend on the level of enrichment desired and upon the amount of ^{235}U that ends up in the depleted uranium (DU). However, unlike the number of SWUs required during enrichment, which increases with decreasing levels of ^{235}U in the depleted stream, the amount of NU needed will decrease with decreasing levels of ^{235}U that end up in the DU.

For example, in the enrichment of LEU for use in a light water reactor, it is typical for the enriched stream to contain 3.6% ^{235}U (as compared to 0.7% in NU) while the depleted stream contains 0.2% to 0.3% ^{235}U. In order to produce one kilogram of this LEU it would require approximately 8 kilograms of NU and 4.5 SWU if the DU stream was allowed to have 0.3% ^{235}U. On the other hand, if the depleted stream had only 0.2% ^{235}U, then it would require just 6.7 kilograms of NU, but nearly 5.7 SWU of enrichment. Because the amount of NU required and the number of SWUs required during enrichment change in opposite directions, if NU is cheap and enrichment services are more expensive, then the operators will typically choose to allow more ^{235}U to be left in the DU stream whereas if NU is more expensive and enrichment is less so, then they would choose the opposite.

When converting uranium (hexafluoride, hex for short) to metal, 0.3% is lost during manufacturing.

== Downblending ==
The opposite of enriching is downblending; surplus HEU can be downblended to LEU to make it suitable for use in commercial nuclear fuel.

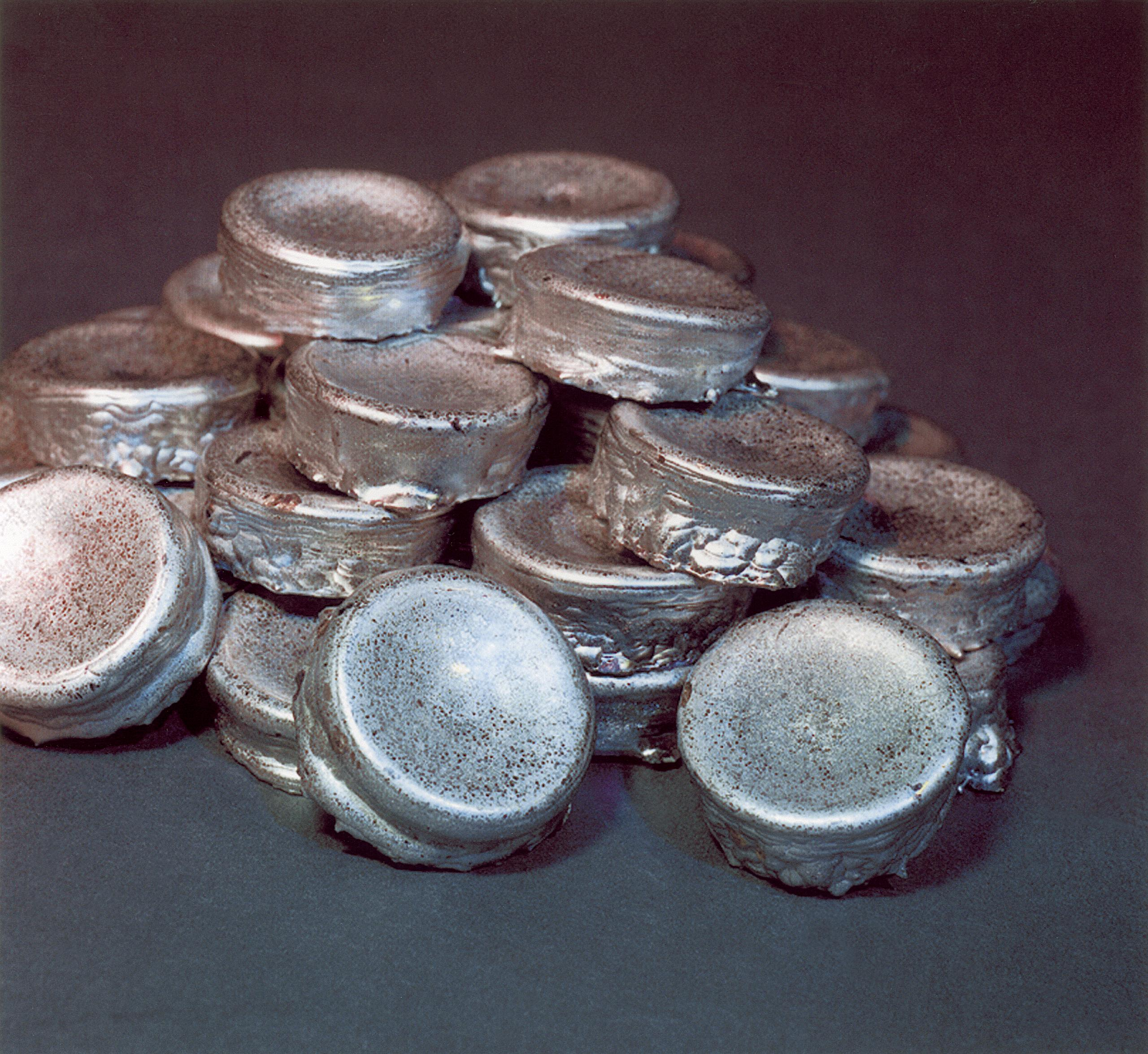
Enriched uranium produced at LLNL plant was collected as nuggets the size and thickness of several quarters.

The HEU feedstock can contain unwanted uranium isotopes: ^{234}U is a minor isotope contained in natural uranium, primarily as a product of alpha decay of ^{238}U. The half-life of ^{238}U is much larger than that of ^{234}U, and so it is produced and destroyed at the same rate in a constant steady state equilibrium, bringing any sample with sufficient ^{238}U content to a stable ratio of ^{234}U to ^{238}U (over long enough timescales). During the enrichment process, its concentration increases but remains well below 1%. High concentrations of ^{236}U are a byproduct from irradiation in a reactor and may be contained in the HEU, depending on its manufacturing history. ^{236}U is produced primarily when ^{235}U absorbs a neutron and does not fission. The production of ^{236}U is thus unavoidable in any thermal neutron reactor with ^{235}U fuel. HEU reprocessed from nuclear weapons material production reactors (with an ^{235}U assay of approximately 50%) may contain ^{236}U concentrations as high as 25%, resulting in concentrations of approximately 1.5% in the blended LEU product. ^{236}U is a neutron poison; therefore the actual ^{235}U concentration in the LEU product must be raised accordingly to compensate for the presence of ^{236}U. While ^{234}U also absorbs neutrons, it is a fertile material that is turned into fissile ^{235}U upon neutron absorption. If ^{236}U absorbs a neutron, the resulting short-lived ^{237}U beta decays to ^{237}Np, which is not usable in thermal neutron reactors but can be chemically separated from spent fuel to be disposed of as waste or to be transmutated into ^{238}Pu (for use in nuclear batteries) in special reactors.

The blendstock can be NU or DU; however, depending on feedstock quality, SEU at typically 1.5 wt% ^{235}U may be used as a blendstock to dilute the unwanted byproducts that may be contained in the HEU feed. Concentrations of these isotopes in the LEU product in some cases could exceed ASTM specifications for nuclear fuel if NU or DU were used. So, the HEU downblending generally cannot contribute to the waste management problem posed by the existing large stockpiles of depleted uranium.

A major downblending undertaking called the Megatons to Megawatts Program converts ex-Soviet weapons-grade HEU to fuel for U.S. commercial power reactors. From 1995 through mid-2005, 250 tonnes of high-enriched uranium (enough for 10,000 warheads) was recycled into low-enriched uranium. The goal is to recycle 500 tonnes by 2013. The decommissioning programme of Russian nuclear warheads accounted for about 13% of total world requirement for enriched uranium leading up to 2008.

The United States Enrichment Corporation has been involved in the disposition of a portion of the 174.3 tonnes of highly enriched uranium (HEU) that the U.S. government declared as surplus military material in 1996. Through the U.S. HEU Downblending Program, this HEU material, taken primarily from dismantled U.S. nuclear warheads, was recycled into low-enriched uranium (LEU) fuel, used by nuclear power plants to generate electricity.

== Global enrichment facilities ==
The following countries are known to operate enrichment facilities: Argentina, Brazil, China, France, Germany, India, Iran, Japan, the Netherlands, North Korea, Pakistan, Russia, the United Kingdom, and the United States. Belgium, Iran, Italy, and Spain hold an investment interest in the French Eurodif enrichment plant, with Iran's holding entitling it to 10% of the enriched uranium output. Countries that had enrichment programs in the past include Libya and South Africa, although Libya's facility was never operational. The Australian company Silex Systems has developed a laser enrichment process known as SILEX (separation of isotopes by laser excitation), which it intends to pursue through financial investment in a U.S. commercial venture by General Electric, Although SILEX has been granted a license to build a plant, the development is still in its early stages as laser enrichment has yet to be proven to be economically viable, and there is a petition being filed to review the license given to SILEX over nuclear proliferation concerns. It has also been claimed that Israel has a uranium enrichment program housed at the Negev Nuclear Research Center site near Dimona.

== Codename ==
During the Manhattan Project, weapons-grade highly enriched uranium was given the codename oralloy, a shortened version of Oak Ridge alloy, after the location of the plants where the uranium was enriched. The term oralloy is still occasionally used to refer to enriched uranium.

== See also ==
- List of laser articles
- MOX fuel
- Nuclear fuel bank
- Nuclear fuel cycle in France
- Orano
- Uranium market
- Uranium mining
