= Companies listed on the New York Stock Exchange (N) =

== N ==
Stock name	Symbol	Country of origin
Nabors Industries	NBR	United States
NACCO Industries	NC	United States
Nam Tai Property Inc.	NTP	Hong Kong
National Bank Holdings Corporation	NBHC	United States
National Bank of Greece	NBG	Greece
National Fuel Gas	NFG	United States
National Grid plc	NGG	United Kingdom
National Health Investors Inc.	NHI	United States
National Oilwell Varco	NOV	United States
National Presto Industries	NPK	United States
National Retail Properties	NNN	United States
Nationstar Mortgage	NSM	United States
Natural Gas Services Group, Inc.	NGS	United States
Vitamin Cottage Natural Grocers	NGVC	United States
Natural Resource Partners LP	NRP	United States
Natuzzi	NTZ	Italy
Nautilus, Inc.	NLS	United States
Navigant Consulting	NCI	United States
Navigator Holdings Ltd.	NVGS	United States
Navios Maritime Acquisition Corporation	NNA	Greece
Navios Maritime Holdings	NM	Greece
Navistar International	NAV	United States
NCI Building Systems	NCS	United States
NCR Corporation	NCR	United States
Neenah Paper, Inc.	NP	United States
Nelnet	NNI	United States
NeoPhotonics Corporation	NPTN	United States
NetSuite Inc.	N	United States
Neustar	NSR	United States
The New Home Company Inc.	NWHM	United States
New Jersey Resources	NJR	United States
New Media Investment Group Inc.	NEWM	United States
New Mountain Capital	NMFC	United States
New Oriental	EDU	China
New Residential Investment Corp	NRZ	United States
New Source Energy Partners L.P.	NSLP	United States
New York & Company	NWY	United States
New York Community Bank	NYCB	United States
The New York Times Company	NYT	United States
Newcastle Investment Corp.	NCT	United States
Newell Rubbermaid	NWL	United States
Ethyl Corporation	NEU	United States
Newmont	NEM	United States
Newpark Resources Inc.	NR	United States
NextEra Energy	NEE	United States
NextEra Energy Partners	NEP	United States
NGL Energy Partners LP	NGL	United States
Nidec	NJ	Japan
Nielsen N.V.	NLSN	Netherlands
Nike, Inc.	NKE	United States
Nimble Storage	NMBL	United States
Nippon Telegraph and Telephone	NTT	Japan
Niska Gas Storage Partners	NKA	United States
NiSource	NI	United States
NL Industries	NL	United States
Noah Holdings	NOAH	China
Nokia	NOK	Finland
Nomura Holdings	NMR	Japan
Norcraft Companies, Inc.	NCFT	United States
Nord Anglia Education	NORD	United States
Nordic American Tankers Limited	NAT	Bermuda
Nordion	NDZ	Canada
Nordstrom	JWN	United States
Norfolk Southern Railway	NSC	United States
Nortel Inversora S A	NTL	Argentina
North American Energy Partners Inc.	NOA	Canada
North European Oil Royalty Trust	NRT	United States
Northeast Utilities	NU	United States
Northern Tier Energy LP	NTI	United States
Northrop Grumman	NOC	United States
NW Natural	NWN	United States
NorthWestern Corporation	NWE	United States
Novartis	NVS	Switzerland
Novo Nordisk	NVO	Denmark
NQ Mobile Inc.	NQ	China
NRG Energy	NRG	United States
NRG Yield, Inc.	NYLD	United States
NTT DoCoMo	DCM	Japan
Nu Skin Enterprises	NUS	United States
Nucor	NUE	United States
NuStar Energy	NS	United States
NuStar GP Holdings, LLC	NSH	United States
NuStar Logistics, L.P.	NSS	United States
Nuverra Environmental Solutions, Inc.	NES	United States
Nvidia Corporation	NVDA	United States
NVR, Inc.	NVR	United States
