= A. W. Pryor =

Australian physicist

- Born: 31 August 1928
- Died: 6 September 2014 (aged 86); Sydney
- Education: University of Queensland; Durham University
- Known for: Crystalography; Neutron diffraction Molecular laser isotope separation
- Awards: David Syme Research Prize
- Scientific career
- Fields: Crystallography; Physics
- Workplaces: Australian Atomic Energy Commission; Macquarie University

Arthur William Pryor (31 August 1928 – 6 September 2014) was an Australian physicist known for his contributions to neutron diffraction and infrared laser isotope separation. Pryor authored and co-authored a number of papers in the field of crystallography and he also co-authored, with B. T. M. Willis, the book Thermal Vibrations in Crystallography.

== Laser isotope separation ==
Pryor conducted research on laser isotope separation using infrared lasers. Earlier work in this area had brought him in contact with J. C. Ward who advocated a new approach to isotope separation based on the phase transition transformation of UF_{6} known as the "Ward process". Pryor provides a unique historical account of laser isotope separation efforts in Australia during the early 1980s that included both visible and infrared laser sources (relevant to AVLIS and MLIS, respectively). In this regard, he refers to the reluctance of the Australian authorities to adopt laser isotope separation with the sentence... "but the cautious hand refrained". Pryor's account was independently corroborated, albeit with a time lag, by other researchers in the field.

== Philosophy ==
Later in his career, Pryor was interested on historical and philosophical aspects of science and physics. He wrote various recordings on this subject, which were broadcast on 2SER FM radio in the 1980-1983 period.

== Career ==
Pryor was educated at the University of Queensland and completed his doctoral studies at Durham University. He spent most of his career at Lucas Heights, as a scientist in the former Australian Atomic Energy Commission, and was a faculty visiting fellow at Macquarie University where he lectured on atomic physics.

Pryor was a Fellow of the Australian Institute of Physics and received the 1964 David Syme Research Prize from the University of Melbourne.

He died at the age of 86, on 6 September 2014.
