= Laser isotope separation =

Laser isotope separation, or laser enrichment, is a technology of isotope separation using selective ionization of atoms or molecules by the means of precisely tuned lasers.

The techniques are:

- Atomic vapor laser isotope separation (AVLIS), applied to atoms
- Molecular laser isotope separation (MLIS), applied to molecules
- Separation of isotopes by laser excitation (SILEX), a classified process involving uranium hexafluoride and a carrier gas.
