= Santur Corporation =

Santur logo

Santur Corporation developed, manufactured and commercialized tunable lasers as well as parallel array devices and photonic integrated circuits for the telecommunications industry. It was established in November 2000 in Fremont, California initially developing and commercializing the tunable lasers for metro and long-haul dense wavelength-division multiplexing (WDM) systems. The company had a patented a Distributed Feedback Laser (DFB)-array technology, which enabled the manufacture of broadly tunable sources that have the same performance and reliability as fixed DFBs. Santur claimed to have set a new standard in the telecommunications industry with its technology that features a unique combination of high power, wide tunability, stability, Telcordia GR-468 reliability, and value.

NeoPhotonics, a California-based company that develops, manufactures, and sells optoelectronic products, acquired Santur in 2011 for $39.2 million. The acquisition allowed NeoPhotonics access to Santur's 40 and 100 Gbit/s products. As the long-distance fiber optics technology has moved to coherent modulation techniques and laser linewidth has become more important, the Santur design of a DFB array with a MEMS mirror has been discontinued in favor of an external cavity tunable laser that was developed by NewFocus, Intel, and then Emcore, and acquired by Neophotonics in 2014.

== Tunable laser technology ==
Santur Corporation's development of tunable lasers was considered timely, as wavelength-division multiplexing (WDM), or adding multiple lanes at different colors into the same fiber for increased capacity was gaining popularity in long haul and metropolitan fiber optic links. A tunable laser could function at any wavelength, eliminating the cost of manufacturing and the logistics of maintaining up to 80 different parts. This is the case since tunability offers a more flexible and less costly operation. Given the large venture capital investments of the time, dozens of approaches and technologies were proposed. Competing companies includes Iolon corporation, Agility Communications, and Bandwidth9. Earlier in 2000, another tunable laser company CoreTek had been sold to Nortel Corporation for approximately $1.4B.

Unlike other tunable lasers that have a single cavity that is adjusted to change the wavelength, Santur used an array of 12 or 14 lasers, each at a different wavelength, all fabricated on a single chip at about a ten micrometre pitch. Simply switching between lasers changes the wavelength in a coarse manner. Like most wavelength controlled telecommunication lasers, the laser chip is mounted on a thermoelectric cooler to stabilize the temperature. By making small adjustments to the inside temperature of the package, fine tuning of the wavelength can be realized. Additionally, the Santur laser package contains a micromechanical mirror that deflects in both x and y axes in order to couple the laser beam to the output fiber. This "switch" is necessary since each laser of the array emits at a different output aperture. The micromechanical mirror loosens tolerances needed for packaging and allows the assembly to be put together with coarse tolerances and aligned electronically.

When the optical market improved in 2006, Santur gained substantial market share. Single chip tunable lasers, such those of Agility (part of JDSU) and Bookham Oclaro had gained popularity, but Santur claimed substantial Internet traffic used their products, of which 200,000 had shipped by 2008.
