= Niska =

Niska may refer to:

== Arts and entertainment ==
- Adelei Niska, a Firefly character
- Niska Elster, a character in TV series Humans

== People ==
- Nisga’a people, an Indigenous people of British Columbia, Canada
  - Nisga’a language
- Niska (rapper) (Georges Stanislas Malif Dinga-Pinto, born 1994), a French rapper
- Algoth Niska (1888–1954), Finnish bootlegger and adventurer
- Maralin Niska (1926–2016), American operatic soprano
- Bodil Niska (born 1954), Norwegian jazz saxophonist
- Harry Niska, Republican Minnesota state representative.

== Places ==
- Niesky or Niska, Lusatia, Germany
- Niska Isle, Niskayuna, New York, U.S.

== Other uses ==
- Niska Gas Storage Partners, a global gas storage service provider

== See also ==
- Niška Banja, a city municipalities in Niš, Serbia
