= Isotope separation =

Concentrating specific isotopes of a chemical element

Isotope separation is the process of concentrating specific isotopes of a chemical element by removing other isotopes. The use of the nuclides produced is varied. The largest variety is used in research (e.g. in chemistry where atoms of "marker" nuclide are used to figure out reaction mechanisms). By tonnage, separating natural uranium into enriched uranium and depleted uranium is the largest application. This process is crucial in the manufacture of uranium fuel for nuclear power plants and is also required for the creation of uranium-based nuclear weapons (unless uranium-233 is used). Plutonium-based weapons use plutonium produced in a nuclear reactor, which must be operated in such a way as to produce plutonium already of suitable isotopic mix or grade.

While chemical elements can be purified through chemical processes, isotopes of the same element have nearly identical chemical properties which makes this type of separation impractical, except for separation of deuterium.

== Techniques ==
There are three types of isotope separation techniques:

- Those based directly on the atomic weight of the isotope.
- Those based on the small differences in chemical reaction rates produced by different atomic weights.
- Those based on properties not directly connected to atomic weight, such as nuclear resonances.

The third type of separation is still experimental; practical separation techniques all depend in some way on the atomic mass. It is therefore generally easier to separate isotopes with a larger relative mass difference. For example, deuterium has twice the mass of ordinary (light) hydrogen and it is generally easier to purify it than to separate uranium-235 from the more common uranium-238. On the other extreme, separation of fissile plutonium-239 from the common impurity plutonium-240, while desirable in that it would allow the creation of gun-type fission weapons from plutonium, is generally agreed to be impractical.

== Enrichment cascades ==
All large-scale isotope separation schemes employ a number of similar stages which produce successively higher concentrations of the desired isotope. Each stage enriches the product of the previous step further before being sent to the next stage. Similarly, the tailings from each stage are returned to the previous stage for further processing. This creates a sequential enriching system called a cascade. There are two important factors that characterize the performance of a cascade. The first is the separation factor, which is a number greater than 1. The second is the number of required stages to get the desired purity.

== Commercial materials ==
To date, large-scale commercial isotope separation of only three elements has occurred. In each case, the rarer of the two most common isotopes of an element has been concentrated for use in nuclear technology:

- Uranium isotopes have been separated to prepare enriched uranium for use as nuclear reactor fuel and in nuclear weapons.
- Hydrogen isotopes have been separated to prepare heavy water for use as a moderator in nuclear reactors.
  - Tritium is both a nuisance in the coolant / moderator of water moderated reactors and a valuable product; it is thus sometimes separated from the coolant.
- Lithium-6 has been concentrated for use in thermonuclear weapons. Tritium is commonly produced from lithium-6 which is often enriched for this purpose.

Some isotopically purified elements are used in smaller quantities for specialist applications, especially in the semiconductor industry, where purified silicon is used to improve crystal structure and thermal conductivity, and carbon with greater isotopic purity to make diamonds with greater thermal conductivity.

Isotope separation is an important process for both peaceful and military nuclear technology, and therefore the capability that a nation has for isotope separation is of extreme interest to the intelligence community.

== Alternatives ==
The only alternative to isotope separation is to manufacture the required isotope in its pure form. This may be done by irradiation of a suitable target, but care is needed in target selection and other factors to ensure that only the required isotope of the element of interest is produced. Isotopes of other elements are not so great a problem as they can be removed by chemical means.

This is particularly relevant in the preparation of high-grade plutonium-239 for use in weapons. It is not practical to separate Pu-239 from Pu-240 or Pu-241. Fissile Pu-239 is produced following neutron capture by uranium-238, but further neutron capture will produce Pu-240 which is less fissile and worse, is a fairly strong neutron emitter, and Pu-241 which decays to Am-241, a strong alpha emitter that poses self-heating and radiotoxicity problems. Therefore, the uranium targets used to produce military plutonium must be irradiated for only a short time, to minimise the production of these unwanted isotopes. Conversely, blending plutonium with Pu-240 renders it less suitable for nuclear weapons.

If the desired goal is not an atom bomb but running a nuclear power plant, the alternative to enrichment of uranium for use in a light-water reactor is the use of a neutron moderator with a lower neutron absorption cross section than protium. Options include heavy water as used in CANDU type reactors or graphite as used in magnox or RBMK reactors. Obtaining heavy water however also requires isotope separation, in this case of hydrogen isotopes, which is easier due to the bigger variation in atomic weight. Both magnox and RBMK reactors had undesirable properties when run with natural uranium, which ultimately led to the replacement of this fuel with low enriched uranium, negating the advantage of foregoing enrichment. Pressurized heavy-water reactors such as the CANDU are still in active use and India which has limited domestic uranium resources and been under a partial nuclear embargo ever since it became an atom bomb state in particular relies on heavy water moderated reactors for its nuclear power. A big downside of heavy water reactors is the enormous upfront cost of the heavy water.

== Methodology ==
=== Diffusion ===
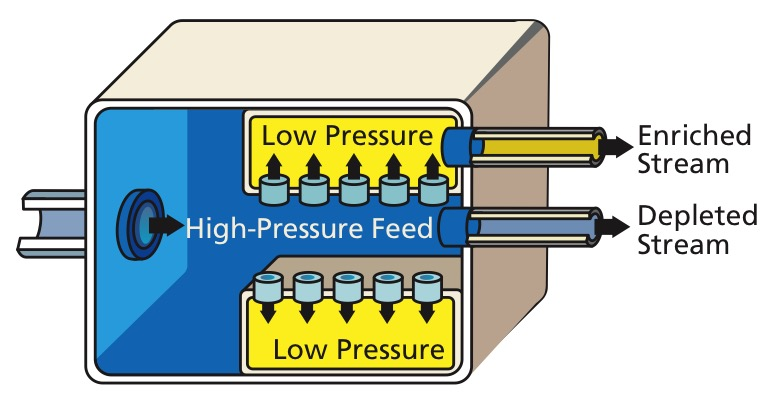
Gaseous diffusion uses microporous membranes to enrich uranium

Often done with gases, but also with liquids, the diffusion method relies on the fact that in thermal equilibrium, two isotopes with the same energy will have different average velocities. The lighter atoms (or the molecules containing them) will travel more quickly through a membrane, whose pore diameters are not larger than the mean free path length (Knudsen flow). The speed ratio is equal to the inverse square root of the mass ratio, so the amount of separation is small. For example for ^{235}UF_{6} versus ^{238}UF_{6} it is 1.0043. Hence many cascaded stages are needed to obtain high purity. This method is expensive due to the work needed to push gas through a membrane and the many stages necessary, each requiring recompression of the gas.

The first large-scale separation of uranium isotopes was achieved by the United States in large gaseous diffusion separation plants at Clinton Engineering Works, which were established as part of the Manhattan Project. These used uranium hexafluoride gas as the process fluid. Nickel powder and electro-deposited nickel mesh diffusion barriers were pioneered by Edward Adler and Edward Norris. Due to the high energy consumption, enrichment of uranium by diffusion was gradually replaced by more efficient methods.

The last diffusion plant closed in 2013. The Paducah Gaseous Diffusion Plant was a US government effort to generate highly enriched uranium to power military reactors and create nuclear bombs which led to the establishment of the facility in 1952. Paducah's enrichment was initially kept to low levels, and the facility operated as a "feed facility" for other defence facilities that processed the enriched uranium at Oak Ridge National Laboratory in Oak Ridge, Tennessee, and Portsmouth Gaseous Diffusion Plant in Piketon, Ohio. The goal of Paducah and its sister facility in Piketon was adjusted in the 1960s when they started to enrich uranium for use in commercial nuclear reactors to produce energy.

=== Centrifugal ===
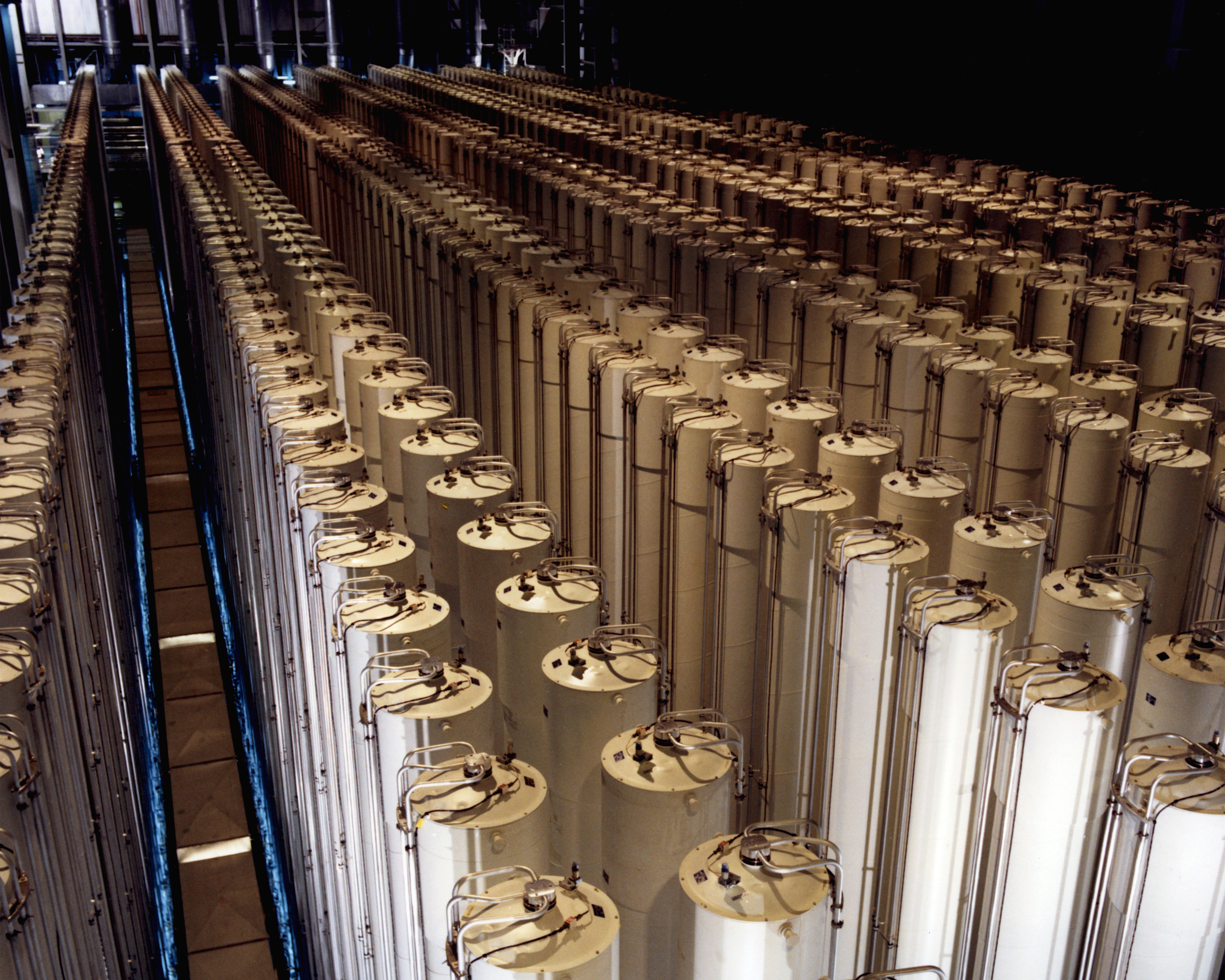
A cascade of gas centrifuges at a US uranium enrichment plant.

Centrifugal schemes rapidly rotate the material allowing the heavier isotopes to go closer to an outer radial wall. This is often done in gaseous form using a Zippe-type centrifuge. Centrifuging plasma can separate isotopes as well as separating ranges of elements for radioactive waste reduction, nuclear reprocessing, and other purposes. The process is called "plasma mass separation"; the devices are called "plasma mass filter" or "plasma centrifuge" (not to be confused with medical centrifuges).

The centrifugal separation of isotopes was first suggested by Aston and Lindemann in 1919 and the first successful experiments were reported by Beams and Haynes on isotopes of chlorine in 1936. However attempts to use the technology during the Manhattan Project were unproductive. In modern times it is the main method used throughout the world to enrich uranium and as a result remains a fairly secretive process, hindering a more widespread uptake of the technology. In general a feed of UF_{6} gas is connected to a cylinder that is rotated at high speed. Near the outer edge of the cylinder heavier gas molecules containing U-238 collect, while molecules containing U-235 concentrate at the centre and are then fed to another cascade stage.

Use of gaseous centrifugal technology to enrich isotopes is desirable as power consumption is greatly reduced when compared to more conventional techniques such as diffusion plants since fewer cascade steps are required to reach similar degrees of separation. As well as requiring less energy to achieve the same separation, far smaller scale plants are possible, making them an economic possibility for a small nation attempting to produce a nuclear weapon. Pakistan is believed to have used this method in developing its nuclear weapons.

Vortex tubes were used by South Africa in their Helikon vortex separation process. The gas is injected tangentially into a chamber with special geometry that further increases its rotation to a very high rate, causing the isotopes to separate. The method is simple because vortex tubes have no moving parts, but energy intensive, about 50 times greater than gas centrifuges. A similar process, known as jet nozzle was created in Germany, with a demonstration plant built in Brazil, and they went as far as developing a site to fuel the country's nuclear plants.

=== Electromagnetic ===
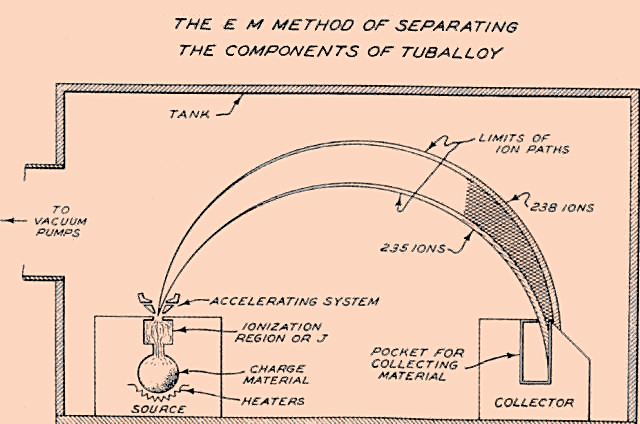
Schematic diagram of uranium isotope separation in a calutron

Electromagnetic separation is mass spectrometry on a large scale, so it is sometimes referred to as mass spectrometry. It uses the fact that charged particles are deflected in a magnetic field and the amount of deflection depends upon the particle's mass. It is very expensive for the quantity produced, as it has an extremely low throughput, but it can allow very high purities to be achieved. This method is often used for processing small amounts of pure isotopes for research or specific use (such as isotopic tracers) but is impractical for industrial use.

At Oak Ridge National Laboratory and at the University of California, Berkeley, Ernest O. Lawrence developed electromagnetic separation for much of the uranium used in the first atomic bombs. Devices using his principle are named calutrons. After the war the method was largely abandoned as impractical. It had only been undertaken (along with diffusion and other technologies) to guarantee there would be enough material for use, whatever the cost. Its main eventual contribution to the war effort was to further concentrate material from the gaseous diffusion plants to higher levels of purity.

=== Laser ===
In this method a laser is tuned to a wavelength which excites only one isotope of the material and ionizes those atoms preferentially. For atoms, the resonant absorption of light for an isotope depends on

- the nuclear mass (noticeable mainly with light elements)
- the nuclear volume (causing a deviation from the Coulomb potential, noticeable for heavier elements)
- hyperfine splitting of electronic transitions, if the nucleus has a spin,

allowing finely tuned lasers to interact with only one isotope. After the atom is ionized it can be removed from the sample by applying an electric field. This method is often abbreviated as AVLIS (atomic vapor laser isotope separation). This method has only been developed as laser technology has improved in the 1970s to 1980s. Attempts to develop it to an industrial scale for uranium enrichment were successively given up in the 1990s "due to never ending technical difficulties" and because centrifuges have reached technical maturity in the meantime. However, it is a major concern to those in the field of nuclear proliferation, because it may be cheaper and more easily hidden than other methods of isotope separation. Tunable lasers used in AVLIS include the dye laser and more recently diode lasers.

A second method of laser separation is known as molecular laser isotope separation (MLIS). In this method, an infrared laser is directed at uranium hexafluoride gas (if enrichment of uranium is desired), exciting molecules that contain a U-235 atom. A second laser, either also in the IR (infrared multiphoton dissociation) or in the UV, frees a fluorine atom, leaving uranium pentafluoride which then precipitates out of the gas. Cascading the MLIS stages is more difficult than with other methods because the UF_{5} must be fluorinated back to UF_{6} before being introduced into the next MLIS stage. But with light elements, the isotope selectivity is usually good enough that cascading is not required.

Several alternative MLIS schemes have been developed. For example, one uses a first laser in the near-infrared or visible region, where a selectivity of over 20:1 can be obtained in a single stage. This method is called OP-IRMPD (Overtone Pre-excitation—IR Multiple Photon Dissociation). But due to the small absorption probability in the overtones, too many photons remain unused, so that the method did not reach industrial feasibility. Also some other MLIS methods suffer from wasting of the expensive photons.

Finally, the 'Separation of isotopes by laser excitation' (SILEX) process, developed by Silex Systems in Australia, has been licensed to General Electric for the development of a pilot enrichment plant. For uranium, it uses a cold molecular beam with UF_{6} in a carrier gas, in which the ^{235}UF_{6} is selectively excited by an infrared laser near 16 μm. In contrast to the excited molecules, the nonexcited heavier isotopic molecules tends to form clusters with the carrier gas, and these clusters stay closer to the axis of the molecular beam, so that they can pass a skimmer and are thus separated from the excited lighter isotope.

Starting in 1994, yet another scheme has been proposed for deuterium separation using Trojan wave packets formed in a circularly or linearly polarized electromagnetic field. The process of Trojan wave packet formation by the adiabatic-rapid passage depends in an ultra-sensitive way on the reduced electron and nucleus mass so that the same field frequency leads to excitation of Trojan or anti-Trojan wave packets depending on the isotope. In theory, Trojan wave packets and their giant, rotating electric dipole moments could then be $\pi$-shifted in phase and the atomic beam split in the gradient of the electric field in an analogous way to the Stern–Gerlach experiment.

=== Chemical methods ===
Although isotopes of a single element are normally described as having the same chemical properties, this is not strictly true. In particular, reaction rates are very slightly affected by atomic mass.

Techniques using this are most effective for light atoms such as hydrogen. Lighter isotopes tend to react or evaporate more quickly than heavy isotopes, allowing them to be separated. This is how heavy water is produced commercially, see Girdler sulfide process for details. Lighter isotopes also disassociate more rapidly under an electric field. This process in a large cascade was used at the heavy water production plant at Rjukan.

One candidate for the largest kinetic isotopic effect ever measured at room temperature, 305, may eventually be used for the separation of tritium (T). The effects for the oxidation of tritiated formate anions to HTO were measured as:

k(HCO_{2}^{−}) = 9.54 M^{−1}s^{−1}	k(H)/k(D) = 38
k(DCO_{2}^{−}) = 9.54 M^{−1}s^{−1}	k(D)/k(T) = 8.1
k(TCO_{2}^{−}) = 9.54 M^{−1}s^{−1}	k(H)/k(T) = 305

=== Distillation ===
Isotopes of hydrogen, carbon, oxygen, and nitrogen can be enriched by distilling suitable light compounds over long columns. The separation factor is the ratio of vapor pressures of two isotopic molecules. In equilibrium such a separation results at each theoretical plate of the column and is multiplied by the same factor in the next step (at the next plate). Because the elementary separation factor is small, a large number of such plates is needed. This requires total column heights of 20 to 300 m.

The lower vapor pressure of the heavier molecule is due to its higher energy of vaporization, which in turn results from its lower energy of zero-point vibration in the intermolecular potential. As expected from formulas for vapor pressure, the ratio becomes more favorable at lower temperatures (lower pressures). The vapor pressure ratio for H_{2}O to D_{2}O is 1.055 at 50 °C (123 mbar) and 1.026 at 100 °C (1013 mbar). For ^{12}CO to ^{13}CO it is 1.007 near the normal boiling point (81.6 K), and 1.003 for ^{12}CH_{4} to ^{13}CH_{4} near 111.7 K (boiling point).

The ^{13}C enrichment by (cryogenic) distillation was developed in the late 1960s by scientists at Los Alamos National Laboratory. It is still the preferred method for^{13}C enrichment. Deuterium enrichment by water distillation is only done, if it was preenriched by a process (chemical exchange) with lower energy demand. Beginning with the low natural abundance (0.015% D) would require evaporation of too large quantities of water.

== Separative work unit ==
Separative work unit (SWU) is a complex unit which is a function of the amount of uranium processed and the degree to which it is enriched, i.e. the extent of increase in the concentration of the U-235 isotope relative to the remainder.

The unit is strictly: kilogram separative work unit, and it measures the quantity of separative work (indicative of energy used in enrichment) when feed and product quantities are expressed in kilograms. The effort expended in separating a mass F of feed of assay xf into a mass P of product assay xp and waste of mass W and assay xw is expressed in terms of the number of separative work units needed, given by the expression SWU = WV(xw) + PV(xp) - FV(xf), where V(x) is the "value function," defined as V(x) = (1 - 2x) ln ((1 - x) /x).

Separative work is expressed in SWUs, kg SW, or kg UTA (from the German Urantrennarbeit )

- 1 SWU = 1 kg SW = 1 kg UTA
- 1 kSWU = 1.0 t SW = 1 t UTA
- 1 MSWU = 1 kt SW = 1 kt UTA

If, for example, for 100 kilograms (220 pounds) of natural uranium, it takes about 60 SWU to produce 10 kilograms (22 pounds) of uranium enriched in U-235 content to 4.5%.

== Isotope separators for research ==
Radioactive beams of specific isotopes are widely used in the fields of experimental physics, biology and materials science. The production and formation of these radioactive atoms into an ionic beam for study is an entire field of research carried out at many laboratories throughout the world. The first isotope separator was developed at the Copenhagen Cyclotron by Bohr and coworkers using the principle of electromagnetic separation. Today, there are many laboratories around the world that supply beams of radioactive ions for use.

Arguably the principal Isotope Separator On Line (ISOL) is ISOLDE at CERN, which is a joint European facility spread across the Franco-Swiss border near the city of Geneva. This laboratory uses mainly proton spallation of uranium carbide targets to produce a wide range of radioactive fission fragments that are not found naturally on earth. During spallation (bombardment with high energy protons), a uranium carbide target is heated to several thousand degrees so that radioactive atoms produced in the nuclear reaction are released.

Once out of the target, the vapour of radioactive atoms travels to an ionizer cavity. This ionizer cavity is a thin tube made of a refractory metal with a high work function allowing for collisions with the walls to liberate a single electron from a free atom (surface ionization effect). Once ionized, the radioactive species are accelerated by an electrostatic field and injected into an electromagnetic separator. As ions entering the separator are of approximately equal energy, those ions with a smaller mass will be deflected by the magnetic field by a greater amount than those with a heavier mass. This differing radius of curvature allows for isobaric purification to take place.

Once purified isobarically, the ion beam is then sent to the individual experiments. In order to increase the purity of the isobaric beam, laser ionization can take place inside the ionizer cavity to selectively ionize a single element chain of interest. At CERN, this device is called the Resonance Ionization Laser Ion Source (RILIS). Currently over 60% of all experiments opt to use the RILIS to increase the purity of radioactive beams.

=== Beam production capability ===
As the production of radioactive atoms by the ISOL technique depends on the free atom chemistry of the element to be studied, there are certain beams which cannot be produced by simple proton bombardment of thick actinide targets. Refractory metals such as tungsten and rhenium do not emerge from the target even at high temperatures due to their low vapour pressure. In order to produce these types of beams, a thin target is required. The Ion Guide Isotope Separator On Line (IGISOL) technique was developed in 1981 at the University of Jyväskylä cyclotron laboratory in Finland. In this technique, a thin uranium target is bombarded with protons and nuclear reaction products recoil out of the target in a charged state. The recoils are stopped in a gas cell and then exit through a small hole in the side of the cell where they are accelerated electrostatically and injected into a mass separator. This method of production and extraction takes place on a shorter timescale compared to the standard ISOL technique and isotopes with short half-lives (sub millisecond) can be studied using an IGISOL. An IGISOL has also been combined with a laser ion source at the Leuven Isotope Separator On Line (LISOL) in Belgium. Thin target sources generally provide significantly lower quantities of radioactive ions than thick target sources and this is their main drawback.

As experimental nuclear physics progresses, it is becoming more and more important to study the most exotic of radioactive nuclei. In order to do so, more inventive techniques are required to create nuclei with extreme proton/neutron ratios. An alternative to the ISOL techniques described here is that of fragmentation beams, where the radioactive ions are produced by fragmentation reactions on a fast beam of stable ions impinging on a thin target (usually of beryllium atoms). This technique is used, for example, at the Facility for Rare Isotope Beams (FRIB) at Michigan State University and at the Radioactive Isotope Beam Factory (RIBF) at RIKEN, in Japan.
