= Bruce W. Shore =

American theoretical physicist (1935–2021)

- Born: 1935
- Died: 9 January 2021 (aged 85–86)
- Citizenship: USA
- Education: Massachusetts Institute of Technology
- Scientific career
- Fields: theoretical physics
- Workplaces: Harvard Observatory; Kansas State University; Lawrence Livermore National Laboratory

Bruce W. Shore (1935 – 9 January 2021) was an American theoretical physicist known for his works in atomic physics and the theory of the interaction of light with matter.

== Biography ==
In 1960, at the Massachusetts Institute of Technology, Shore defended his doctoral thesis in experimental nuclear chemistry. The next decade he worked at the Harvard Observatory and the Kansas State University. In 1970, he joined Lawrence Livermore National Laboratory, where he worked until his retirement in 2001. In the 1980s, Shore spent his sabbaticals lecturing at Imperial College London. Since 1991, he has been closely collaborating with researchers from the Technical University of Kaiserslautern, and since the late 2000s, from the Technical University of Darmstadt. After receiving the Humboldt Prize in 1997, he spent a whole year in Germany. He was also an editor of the Journal of the Optical Society of America B and Reviews of Modern Physics. He was elected a Fellow of the American Physical Society and the Optica.

In the 1970s, Shore was engaged in secret research on laser isotope separation. In 1975, he discovered the phenomenon of population trapping, which leads to a decrease in the efficiency of ionization of atoms when they are excited by an additional laser. In 1983, he developed the Morris—Shore transformation, which makes it possible to represent a complex system of excitations of energy levels of a quantum system through a set of independent energy levels and two-level systems. The results of Shore's work in the 1970s—1980s were summarized in his two-volume monograph The Theory of Coherent Atomic Excitation. His research since the early 1990s was summarized in his 2011 book Manipulating Quantum Structure Using Laser Pulses.

He was married to Randi, with whom he had five children.

== Select publications ==
Books

- Shore B.W.; Menzel D.H. (1968). Principles of Atomic Spectra. Wiley.
- Shore B.W. (1990). The Theory of Coherent Atomic Excitation. Wiley.
- Shore B.W. (2011). Manipulating Quantum Structure Using Laser Pulses. Cambridge University Press.
- Shore B.W. (2020). Our Changing Views of Photons: A Tutorial Memoir. Oxford University Press. Bibcode:2020ocvp.book.....S.

Scientific papers

- Shore B.W. (1981). "Scattering theory of absorption-line profiles and refractivity". Reviews of Modern Physics. 67 (2): 439–462. doi:10.1103/RevModPhys.39.439.
- Bernhardt A.F.; Shore B.W. (1981). "Coherent atomic deflection by resonant standing waves". Physical Review A. 23 (3): 1290–1301. Bibcode:1981PhRvA..23.1290B. doi:10.1103/PhysRevA.23.1290.
- Morris J.R.; Shore B.W. (1983). "Reduction of degenerate two-level excitation to independent two-state systems". Physical Review A. 27 (2): 906–912. Bibcode:1983PhRvA..27..906M. doi:10.1103/PhysRevA.27.906.
- Shore B.W.; Knight P.L. (1993). "The Jaynes–Cummings model". Journal of Modern Optics. 40 (7): 1195–1238. Bibcode:1993JMOp...40.1195S. doi:10.1080/09500349314551321.
- Perry M.D.; Boyd R.D.; Britten J.A.; Decker D.; Shore B.W. (1995). "High-efficiency multilayer dielectric diffraction gratings". Optics Letters. 20 (8): 940–942. Bibcode:1995OptL...20..940P. doi:10.1364/OL.20.000940. OSTI 376954. PMID 19859381.
- Stuart B.C.; Feit M.D.; Rubenchik A.M.; Shore B.W.; Perry M.D. (1995). "Laser-induced damage in dielectrics with nanosecond to subpicosecond pulses". Physical Review Letters. 74 (12): 2248–2251. Bibcode:1995PhRvL..74.2248S. doi:10.1103/PhysRevLett.74.2248. PMID 10057880.
- Stuart B.C.; Feit M.D.; Herman S.; Rubenchik A.M.; Shore B.W.; Perry M.D. (1996). "Optical ablation by high-power short-pulse lasers". Journal of the Optical Society of America B. 13 (2): 459–468. Bibcode:1996JOSAB..13..459S. doi:10.1364/JOSAB.13.000459.
- Stuart B.; Feit M.; Herman S.; Rubenchik A.; Shore B.; Perry M. (1996). "Nanosecond-to-femtosecond laser-induced breakdown in dielectrics". Physical Review B. 53 (4): 1749–1761. Bibcode:1996PhRvB..53.1749S. doi:10.1103/PhysRevB.53.1749. PMID 9983633.
- Bergmann K.; Theuer H.; Shore B.W. (1998). "Coherent population transfer among quantum states of atoms and molecules". Reviews of Modern Physics. 70 (3): 1003–1025. Bibcode:1998RvMP...70.1003B. doi:10.1103/revmodphys.70.1003.
- Vitanov N.V.; Halfmann T.; Shore B.W.; Bergmann K. (2001). "Laser-induced population transfer by adiabatic passage techniques". Annual Review of Physical Chemistry. 52: 763–809. Bibcode:2001ARPC...52..763V. doi:10.1146/annurev.physchem.52.1.763. PMID 11326080.
- Vitanov N.V.; Rangelov A.A.; Shore B.W.; Bergmann K. (2017). "Stimulated Raman adiabatic passage in physics, chemistry, and beyond". Reviews of Modern Physics. 89 (1) 015006. arXiv:1605.00224. Bibcode:2017RvMP...89a5006V. doi:10.1103/RevModPhys.89.015006. S2CID 118612686.

== Sources ==
- Bergmann, K.; Eberly, J. H.; Knight, P. L. (2021). "Bruce W. Shore, 1935 – 2021". Optics and Photonics News. 33 (1): 50.
