= Silicon Glen =

High tech sector of Scotland

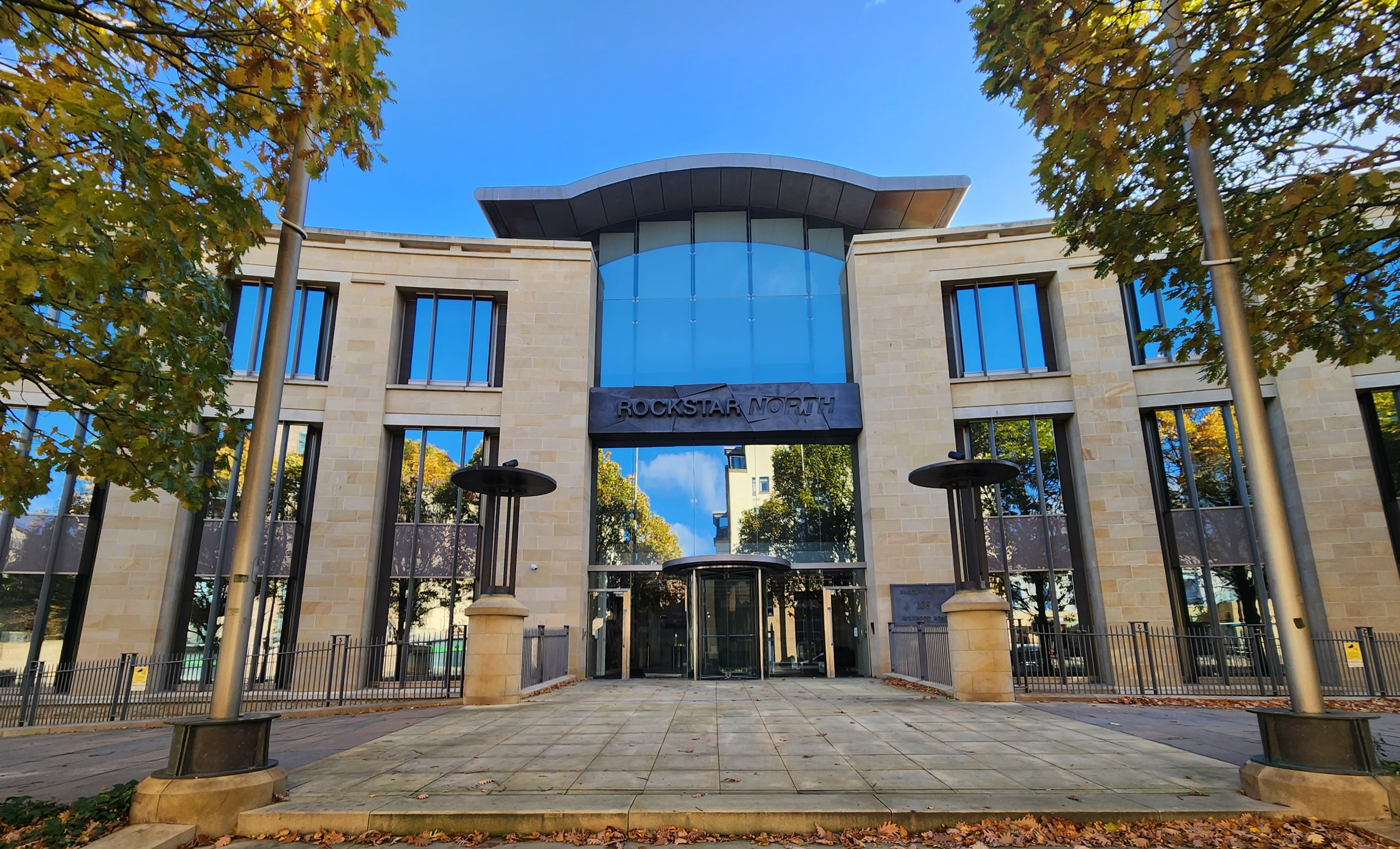
Rockstar North; developers of the best–selling Grand Theft Auto game franchise is based at Barclay House in Edinburgh, the capital city of Scotland.

Silicon Glen is the nickname given to the high tech sector of Scotland, the name inspired by Silicon Valley in California. It is applied to the Central Belt triangle between Dundee, Inverclyde and Edinburgh, which includes Fife, Glasgow and Stirling; although electronics facilities outside this area may also be included in the term. The term has been in use since the 1980s. It does not technically represent a glen as it covers a much wider area than just one valley.

== History ==
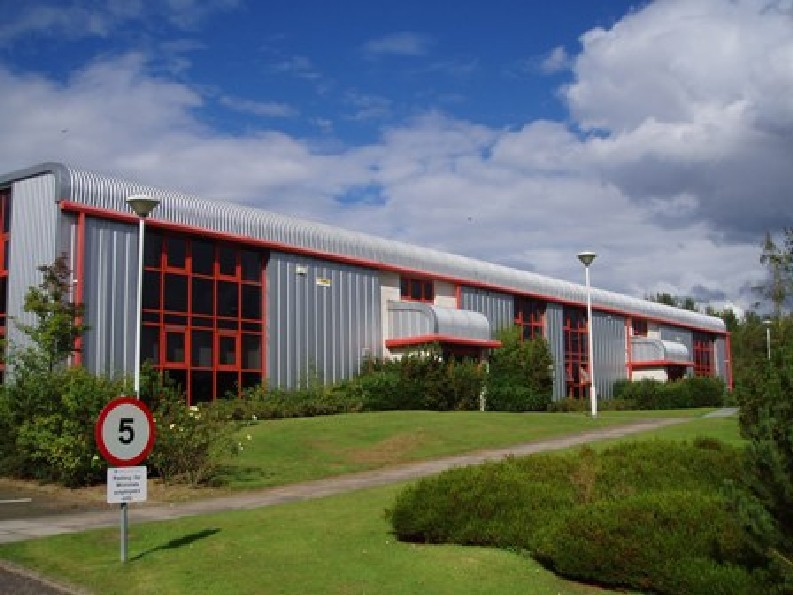
German semiconductor company TDK-Micronas had a large site in Glenrothes.

=== Origins ===
Silicon Glen had its origins in the electronics business with Ferranti establishing a plant in Edinburgh in 1943, relocating facilities from Manchester during the Second World War. When Ferranti remained in Edinburgh, other defence electronics companies also established themselves in Scotland, including the Marconi Company and Barr & Stroud. Major US companies followed in the late 1940s, including Honeywell and NCR Corporation, the latter setting up cash register and adding machine manufacturing in Dundee. IBM decided to establish a presence in the region in 1951, opening a manufacturing facility in Greenock in 1953. Indeed, this was typical of much of the early days of Silicon Glen, which were dominated by electronics manufacturing for foreign companies much more than research and development or the establishment of home grown companies.

=== Electronic dominance ===
The emphasis on electronics came about due to the decline in traditional Scottish heavy industries such as shipbuilding and mining. The government development agencies saw electronics manufacturing as being a positive replacement for people made redundant through heavy industry closures and the associated training and reskilling was relatively easy to achieve.

=== Semiconductors ===
Like the bedrock of Silicon Valley was in semiconductors, Silicon Glen also had a significant influence in semiconductor design and manufacturing starting in 1960 with Hughes Aircraft (now Raytheon) establishing its first facility outside the US in Glenrothes to manufacture germanium and silicon diodes. In 1965 Elliott Automation established a production facility in Glenrothes followed by a MOS research laboratory in 1967. This was followed in 1969 by the establishment of wafer fabs by General Instrument in Glenrothes, Motorola (now Freescale) in East Kilbride and National Semiconductor in Greenock. Signetics also opened a facility in Linlithgow in 1969.

In 1970, Compugraphic relocated from Aldershot to Glenrothes to provide photomask manufacturing for these companies. Other companies who developed semiconductor wafer fabrication or other manufacturing plants included SGS in Falkirk, NEC, Burr-Brown Corporation, IPS (then Seagate Technology) and Kymata (now Kaiam) in Livingston, CST in Glasgow and Micronas in Glenrothes.

There were some other notable successes such as the large Sun Microsystems plant in Linlithgow and the Digital Equipment Corporation semiconductor manufacturing plant in South Queensferry where the pioneering 64-bit Alpha 21064 and its derivatives were made. Digital also opened an office in Livingston, developing their flagship OpenVMS operating system. Digital's South Queensferry facility, opened in 1990 at an estimated cost of $200 million, was eventually sold to Motorola in 1995. At the time, Motorola itself employed 4,000 people at its own semiconductor plant at East Kilbride, as well as operating a cellular telephone plant at Easter Inch.

=== European single market ===
The potential and implications of a single European market motivated foreign companies, particularly those from the United States, to establish operations in Silicon Glen. By having a presence in a European Economic Community member country, companies could formally participate in standards committees and thus exert a degree of influence. Emerging European tariff rules concerning the origin of products were also strong motivators for the establishment of local manufacturing operations, with the EEC having updated its rules in 1989 to consider the location of the wafer diffusion phase of semiconductor production as determining the origin of the manufactured product. Local infrastructure support for the semiconductor industry was well regarded in Scotland, with local universities offering "a strong design base".

Rodime of Glenrothes pioneered the 3.5 inch hard disk drive in 1983 and spent subsequent years defending its patents against (and collecting royalties from) Seagate, Quantum, IBM and others.

=== Computing ===
The manufacturing sector grew to such an extent that at its peak it produced approximately 30% of Europe's PCs, 80% of its workstations, 65% of its ATMs and a significant percentage of its integrated circuits.

== Recent history ==
=== Electronic decline ===
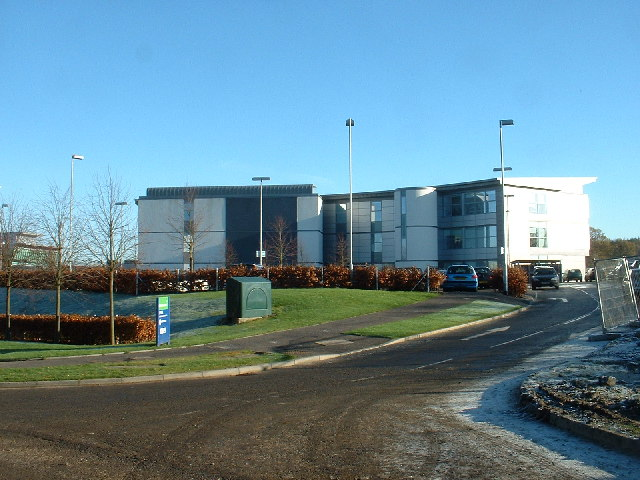
The Alba Centre in Livingston at the heart of Silicon Glen

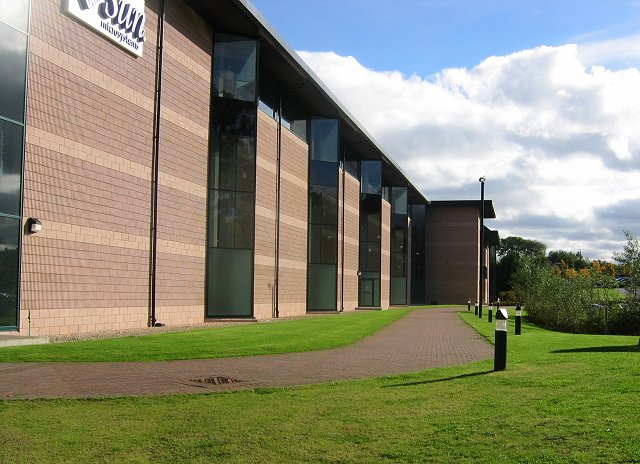
Sun Microsystems in Linlithgow

The heavy dependency on electronics manufacturing hit Silicon Glen hard after the collapse of the hi-tech economy in 2000. Viasystems, National Semiconductor (now Texas Instruments), Motorola and Chunghwa Picture Tubes all laid off substantial numbers of employees or closed factories completely. The effects of the Viasystems closure are still felt in the Scottish Borders today. Digital sold their Alpha facility to Motorola who eventually closed it down. Motorola also closed their factory in Bathgate and the substantial NEC plant in Livingston was also closed. In 2009 Sun ceased manufacturing at its Linlithgow plant and, after successive years of downsizing, NCR ended all manufacturing in Dundee.

However, there are many promising signs as well as a recognition that diversification away from electronics and manufacturing produces a more balanced and stronger economy. There is also more of an interest in encouraging home grown talent.

Scotland had 1,000 companies in electronics employing 25,000 people in 2004, this number has been in decline since 2000 when 48,000 people were employed in the industry in Scotland. However, by 2016 the Silicon Glen has begun to boom once again, with new digital start ups - such as Skyscanner - choosing Scotland for headquarters or offices.

=== Global services ===
To diversify away from electronics and manufacturing, the development agencies now see global services as being a potential area of growth, but there is also substantial interest in the software development industry, including Rockstar North, developers of the market leading Grand Theft Auto series. There is also a dynamic and fast growing electronics design and development industry, based around links between the very strong universities and indigenous companies and projects like the Alba Campus. The software sector has also notably attracted Amazon.com to set up a software development centre in Edinburgh, the first such centre outside the US. There remains a significant presence of global players like National Semiconductor, IBM, Shin Etsu Handotai Europe Ltd and Freescale. The move from a primarily manufacturing dominated region to a wealth creation one has been successful as demonstrated in a report from UBS Wealth Management in 2006 showing Scotland with more venture backed companies per capita than any other UK region.

In addition to the indigenous companies, Silicon Glen continues to have quite a significant semiconductor design community of inward investment companies including Atmel, Freescale, Texas Instruments, Micrel, Analog Devices, Allegro MicroSystems, Micro Linear, Micronas and ST Microelectronics.

Semefab, the former General Instrument semiconductor foundry, has been funded as the UK's Primary Centre for the development of microelectromechanical systems (MEMS) and nanotechnology.

The Open Source Awards (formerly the Scottish Open Source Awards) have been run from Scotland since 2007. It was initially a subset of the Scottish Software Awards.

== Notable companies ==
Many high technology companies are established in Silicon Glen, including:

- Unity (game engine)
- Microsoft
- Amazon.com
- Codeplay
- FanDuel
- IBM
- Oracle Corporation
- Rockstar North
- Adobe Systems
- Canon Medical Systems Corporation
- Skyscanner
- Motorola
- NCR
- Proper Games
- Raytheon
- Texas Instruments
- Freescale
- 3Com
- Agilent
- Analog Devices
- Atmel
- Atos
- Axeon
- ST Microelectronics
- Broadcom Corporation
- Cadence Design Systems
- Cirrus Logic
- Dialog Semiconductor
- Dynamo Games
- IndigoVision
- Thales Optronics
- Toshiba Medical Visualization Systems
- Version 1
- Linn
- Maxim Integrated Products
- Memex Technology Limited
- Micrel
- Braindead Ape Games
- Micronas Intermetall
- Leonardo MW Limited
- Semefab
- Allegro MicroSystems
- AND Digital
- Waracle
- WFS Technologies
- ATEEDA
- Codestuff
- Compugraphics
- ClinTec International
- Clyde Space
- Infinity Works
- Youmanage
- Digital Goldfish
- Kaiam Europe limited
- MEP Technologies Ltd
- Brand Rex
- Elonics
- Kumulos
- Optos
- Micro Linear
- BI Technologies
- Mage Control Systems Ltd
- CRC Group
- Shin Etsu Handotai Europe Ltd

== See also ==
- List of places with 'Silicon' names
