= Kaiam =

American electronics manufacturer

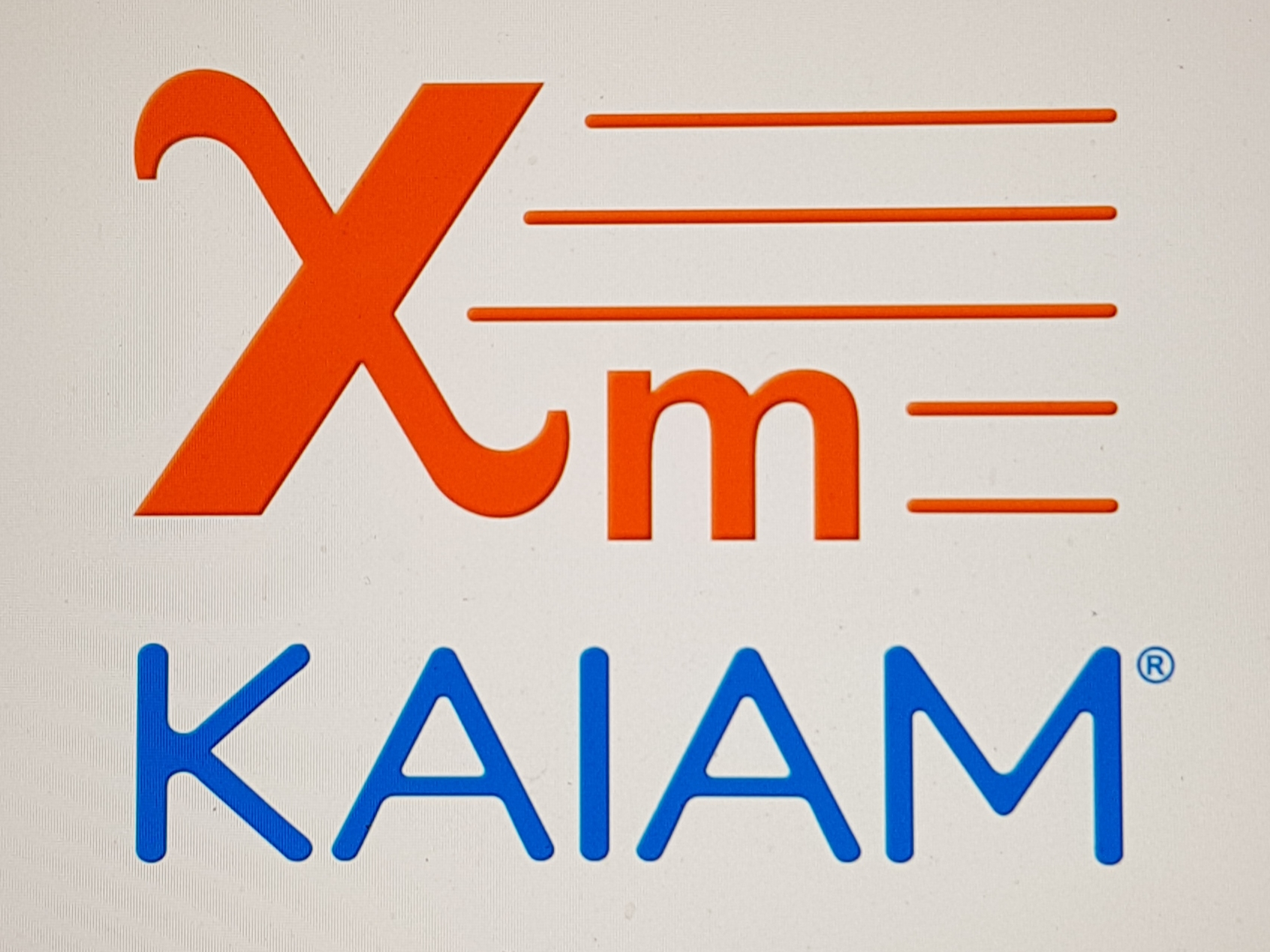

Kaiam Corporation was an American manufacturer of optronics equipment for computer networking. Founded in 2009, it was headquartered in Newark, California, and until December 2018 had a manufacturing facility in Silicon Glen in Scotland. After cash-flow problems and a patent infringement lawsuit, the company collapsed in early 2019. The founder and CEO was Bardia Pezeshki.

== Products ==
Kaiam manufactured 40 Gbit/s and 100 Gbit/s optical transceivers that used MEMS alignment to link servers. Its key technological innovation was to use silicon micromachining technology to perform the high-precision alignment necessary for single-mode fiber optics, rather than manual or robotic processes. In March 2016 it demonstrated the CWDM4, a 100 Gigabit-per-second coarse wavelength-division multiplexing (CWDM) silicon photonics transceiver using silicon modules and receivers. It was also one of the first companies to push for a copackaged approach of optical modules combined with electronics to bring high bandwidth links directly to ICs. A demonstration with Corning at the Optical Fiber Conference showed a 1.6 Tbit/s engine was possible.

== History ==
The company was founded in 2009 by Pezeshki, an Iranian native with a PhD from Stanford University who had previously founded Santur Corporation. It initially produced TOSA/ROSAs (transmitter optical subassemblies and receiver optical subassemblies).

From 2011, Kaiam manufactured optoelectronic modules in Shenzhen, China, using Sanmina as a contract manufacturer, In April 2013 it acquired Gemfire Corp., and in 2014, with a grant from Scottish Enterprise, it moved production from China to Gemfire's wafer fabrication plant in Livingston, West Lothian, which had been built in the late 1990s by Kymata, a company spun off from research at Glasgow University and Southampton University, to produce photonic integrated circuits. Pezeshki relocated to Edinburgh in 2015 to explore moving the company's research and development program to Scotland. At the plant Kaiam produced integrated optical components on a 200mm-diameter wafer silica-on-silicon line, and also 40 Gbit/s and 100 Gbit/s optical packaging products. The workforce at the Scottish plant expanded from approximately 65 to more than 350 by the end of 2015.

In April 2017, Kaiam bought a wafer fabrication facility in Newton Aycliffe in England from Compound Photonics Group; it resold the plant to II-VI Inc. in August that year. and re-invested in the Livingston facility. In May 2018, the company signed a memorandum of understanding with Broadex Technologies Co. for co-manufacturing of transceivers based on its LightScale2 platform for the Chinese market.

The company was unable to secure enough orders to sustain full production at its facility in Scotland, and in December 2018 was seeking a financial partner. Shortly before Christmas, 310 workers at the plant were laid off with no notice and before receiving their end of year pay. Companies House had issued a striking-off order on November 27. Pezeshki visited the plant immediately before workers were informed that the factory would be closed until January 3; the company's subsidiaries Kaiam Europe Limited and Kaiam UK Limited were placed in administration. The redundancies were then made permanent on Christmas Eve; 28 employees were retained to assist with selling the plant. Crowdfunding and in-kind donations were organized to assist those laid off. In March 2019, the plant was sold to Broadex.

Kaiam was sued for patent infringement by Finisar, following which the company collapsed in early 2019. In January, Kaiam made a general assignment for the benefit of its creditors; in May, an agreement was reached under which Finisar accepted an unsecured claim on Kaiam's estate as satisfaction of a $10 million judgment.
