= Noah Holdings =

Chinese Wealth Management Company

Noah Holdings Limited
- Native name: 諾亞控股有限公司
- Type: Public
- Traded as: NYSE: NOAH; SEHK: 6686
- Industry: Financial services
- Founded: August 2005; 21 years ago
- Founders: Jingbo Wang; Zhe Yin
- Headquarters: Shanghai, China
- Key people: Jingbo Wang (Founder and Chairperson); Zhe Yin (Founder, Director and CEO)
- Products: Wealth management; Asset management
- Revenue: ▼US$359.12 million (FY2024)
- Operating income: ▼US$86.84 million (FY2024)
- Net income: ▼US$66.72 million (FY2024)
- AUM: ▼US$20.8 billion (FY2024)
- Total assets: ▼US$1.61 billion (FY2024)
- Total equity: ▼US$1.36 billion (FY2024)
- Number of employees: 1,990 (FY2024)
- Subsidiaries: Gopher Asset Management
- Website: noahgroup.com

Noah Holdings (Noah; Chinese: 諾亞控股; pinyin: Nuòyǎ Kònggǔ) is a Chinese financial services company headquartered in Shanghai, China. It is the largest independent wealth management company in China.

== Background ==
Wang Jingbao worked in the private banking division of Xiangcai Securities. In August 2005, she and her colleague Yin Zhe lead a management buyout of the division. The division was spun out as an independent company and was renamed to Noah. The company was launched with 3 million RMB in capital and worked out of a small office on Shanghai furnished with second-hand furniture purchased from an online market.

In 2007, Noah accepted an investment from Sequoia Capital.

In March 2010, Noah set up its asset management subsidiary, Gopher Asset Management which specialized in fund of funds management of alternative investments.

On 10 November 2010, Noah held an initial public offering on the New York Stock Exchange for $12 apiece. The stock climbed 33% to nearly $16 on its first day.

In early 2012, Noah launched its overseas expansion. It first set up an office in Hong Kong then set up additional offices in Taiwan, Silicon Valley, New York and Singapore.

In October 2016, Sequoia Capital acquired a $52 million stake in Gopher Asset Management. In October 2017, Noah bought back Sequoia's stake.

In July 2022, Noah was cross-listed on the Hong Kong Stock Exchange.

Wang being a devout Christian named the company after Noah's Ark. Gopher Asset Management was named after Gopher wood which was used to build Noah's Ark.

Initially Noah was mainly a distributor of financial products where it sold wealth management products developed by other institutions to high-net-worth individual clients for a commission fee. However it later formed its own investment products to sell.

== Controversies ==
In 2017, products managed by Gopher Asset Management had exposure to China Huishan Dairy Holdings Co., which collapsed after being targeted by short sellers. A Shanghai court agreed to freeze the company's assets worth $79 million at the request of Gopher Asset Management.

In June 2018, the Securities and Futures Commission fined the Hong Kong unit of Noah $640,000 for inadequate controls related to know your customer, due diligence and other requirements during the period January 2014 to June 2016.

In July 2019, Noah stated $495 million of credit products overseen by one of its units were affected by an alleged fraud at Camsing International Holding Ltd. As a result, shares of Noah declined by over 25% in that week as critics accused the company of failing to conduct proper due diligence. Following the losses, Noah dropped offering of non-standard assets and focused only on investments based on publicly traded securities like stocks and bonds.

In March 2023, in response to the collapse of Silicon Valley Bank, Noah stated its business operations were not materially affected.
