= Cascade (chemical engineering) =

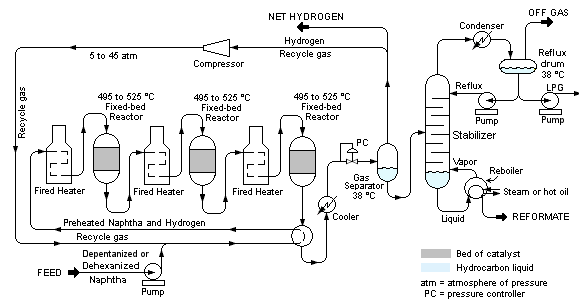
A diagram showing a cascade of three fixed-bed reactors (and three fired heaters associated with them).

In chemical engineering, a cascade is a plant consisting of several similar stages with each processing the output from the previous stage. Cascades are most commonly used in isotope separation, distillation, flotation and other separation or purification processes.

== Cascade process ==
Cascade process is any process that takes place in a number of steps, usually because the single step is too inefficient to produce the desired result. For example, in some uranium-enrichment processes the separation of the desired isotope is only poorly achieved in a single stage; to achieve better separation the process has to be repeated a number of times, in a series, with the enriched fraction of one stage being fed to the succeeding stage for further enrichment. Another example of cascade process is that operating in a cascade liquefier.

== Examples ==
If a still removes 99% of impurities from water (leaving .01 the original amount of impurities), a cascade of three stills will leave (1-0.99)^{3} = 0.000001 = 0.0001% the amount of impurities (99.9999% removed).
