= Version 1 =

Irish company

- Industry: Professional services Technology services
- Founded: 1996
- Headquarters: Dublin, Ireland; London, UK; New York, USA; Chicago, USA
- Area served: Ireland; UK; North America
- Key people: Roop Singh (CEO); Brian Humphries (Chairman); Andrew Langford (CFO)
- Services: Management consulting, Managed services, Software development, Outsourcing
- Revenue: €195 million (2021)
- Owner: independent (1996–2017); Volpi Capital (2017–22); Partners Group (2022–present)
- Number of employees: 3000+
- Website: www.version1.com

Version 1 is an Irish company specializing in international management consulting, software asset management, software development, cloud computing, and outsourcing.

On 13 July 2022 Partners Group completed the acquisition of a majority stake in Version 1.

== History ==
Version 1 was established in Dublin, Ireland in 1996 by Justin Keatinge and John Mullen.

In the years leading up to 2011, Version 1 was named in the Deloitte Fast 50 list, employed more than 150 consultants and had annual revenues of €17.5m.

In 2014, the company opened its London office and expanded its Belfast office. Version 1 acquired the UK-based Tieto Corporation, and were recognized as one of the top 50 workplaces in Europe. They went on to acquire UK-based Rocela Group along with the UK-based Patech Solutions. By year end, they had a total of eight international offices employing more than 500 consultants with annual revenues of €60m.

In 2017, the UK equity firm Volpi Capital LLP became the majority shareholder in Version 1 in a deal that saw a €100 million buy out of the original founders and shareholders. Shareholders included the Development Capital Fund, who invested c. €8m in 2014 and realized in excess of c. €20m on their investment. This buy out raised €90 million of expansion capital to allow Version 1 expand its operations in the UK and Europe. On 24 April 2017, Tom O'Connor was appointed as Version 1 CEO after former CEO Justin Keatinge resigned. Keatinge stayed on Version 1's board and remains a major shareholder.

In 2018, Version 1 announced a €1 million investment into its Innovation Labs. The current areas of focus are: Blockchain, Internet of things, Chatbots, Machine learning, Virtual reality and Augmented reality. In June 2018 Version 1 acquired the HR Transformation specialist Cedar Consulting Ltd.

In 2019, Version 1 was presented alongside ICBF at Oracle OpenWorld, where a Blockchain Solution for the trace-ability of Irish Cattle and meat was discussed. Version 1 also presented at Microsoft Future Decoded 2019, Microsoft's main UK event, with Roger Whitehead, Advisory Services Lead at Version 1 discussing the impact of Application Modernisation.

In 2022, Version 1 are nominated for "Employer of the Year" in the Women in IT Awards 2023.
