= Iolon =

Defunct laser company

Iolon logo

Iolon Inc. was a manufacturer and designer of tunable lasers and optical devices. Its headquarters were in San Jose, California. Its products included the Apollo line of lasers, as well as optical switches, polarization controllers, tunable filters, spectral monitors, and universal transponders. Iolon raised over US$85 million in capital during the dot-com bubble of 1995–2001, but faltered as the telecommunications market tightened after the bubble burst. Iolon's remaining assets were bought by Coherent in 2005, for $5 million.

In 2006, Luna Technologies acquired the rights to sell a version of the Apollo laser for use in fiber optic test and measurement instrumentation, and sensing applications. They are selling the modified Apollo laser under the brand name "Phoenix".
