= Separation of isotopes by laser excitation =

Method of enriching uranium

Separation of isotopes by laser excitation (SILEX) is an experimental process for producing enriched uranium. It is strongly suspected that SILEX utilizes laser condensation repression to excite a vibrational mode of the ^{235}Uranium isotope in uranium hexafluoride (UF_{6}), allowing this lighter molecule to move more rapidly to the outer rim of a gaseous jet and resist condensing compared to heavier, unexcited ^{238}UF_{6}. This differs from previous laser enrichment methods: one using atomic uranium (atomic vapor laser isotope separation (AVLIS)) and another molecular method that uses lasers to dissociate a fluorine atom from ^{235}UF_{6} (molecular laser isotope separation (MLIS)), allowing the enriched product to precipitate.

While Australian company Silex Systems Limited is the most prominent developer of this technology (as part of the Global Laser Enrichment consortium), the acronym SILEX refers to a physical separation concept utilizing condensation repression. Slight variations in operating parameters, equipment arrangements, lasers and their capabilities, may exist from one SILEX-type process to the next (under a different name), but the physical separation concept remains the same if condensation repression is utilized, especially when compared to that used by AVLIS or MLIS.

== History ==
Development of various molecular laser isotope separation (MLIS) variants began in the 1970s. The key technology is an infrared laser, which vibrationally excites only one isotope in gaseous uranium hexafluoride. This requires a wavelength near 16 μm. Traditional MLIS continued to excite the molecules unto dissociation, at which point they crystallized as uranium-235 pentafluoride.

After initial euphoria, laser isotope separation research was mostly abandoned during the 1990s, mainly because it still required extensive and uncertain research and development work, while gas centrifuges had reached technological maturity. However, Australia continued SILEX research.

In November 1996, Silex Systems Limited licensed its technology exclusively to United States Enrichment Corporation (USEC). In 1999, the United States and Australia signed an international treaty for SILEX R&D. However, in 2003 USEC left the project.

Silex Systems concluded the second stage of testing in 2005 and began its Test Loop Program. In 2007, the company signed an exclusive commercialization and licensing agreement with General Electric Corporation (GE), transferring their test loop to GE's facility in Wilmington, North Carolina. That year, GE Hitachi Nuclear Energy (GEH) signed letters of intent for uranium enrichment services with Exelon and Entergy - the US' two largest nuclear utilities.

In 2008, GEH spun off Global Laser Enrichment (GLE) and announced the first potential commercial SILEX facility. The Nuclear Regulatory Commission (NRC) approved a license amendment allowing GLE to operate the Test Loop. Also in 2008, Cameco Corporation, Canada, the world's largest uranium producer, joined GE and Hitachi as a part owner of GLE.

In 2010, concerns were raised that the SILEX process poses a threat to global nuclear security.

Between 2011 and 2012, GLE applied for and received a permit to build a commercial plant at Wilmington. The plant would enrich to 8% ^{235}U, the upper end of low-enriched uranium.

In 2014, both GLE and Silex Systems restructured, with Silex halving its workforce. In 2016 GEH withdrew from GLE, writing off their investment.

In 2016, the United States Department of Energy (DOE) agreed to sell about 300,000 tonnes of depleted uranium hexafluoride to GLE for re-enrichment (from 0.35 to 0.7 % ^{235}U) over 40 years at a proposed Paducah, Kentucky site.

In 2018, Silex Systems abandoned plans for GLE, intending to repatriate the SILEX technology to Australia.

In 2021, Silex Systems took majority ownership (51%) of GLE, with Cameco (49%) as minority owner. Under an agreement between GLE and DOE, GLE agreed to re-enrich to natural levels several hundred kilotons of depleted uranium tailings from the last enrichment plant to use gaseous diffusion. That plant operated until 2013.

== Process ==
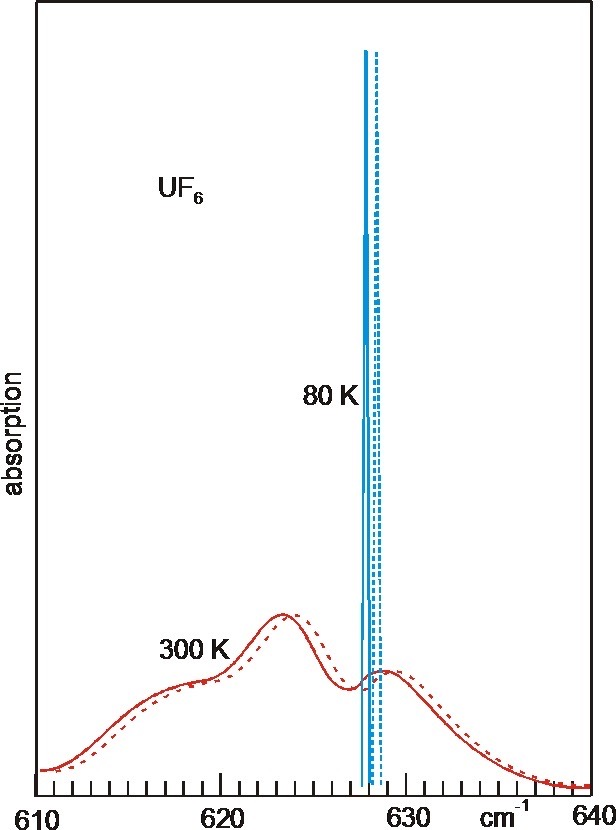
Infrared absorption spectra of the two UF_{6} isotopes at 300 and 80 K.

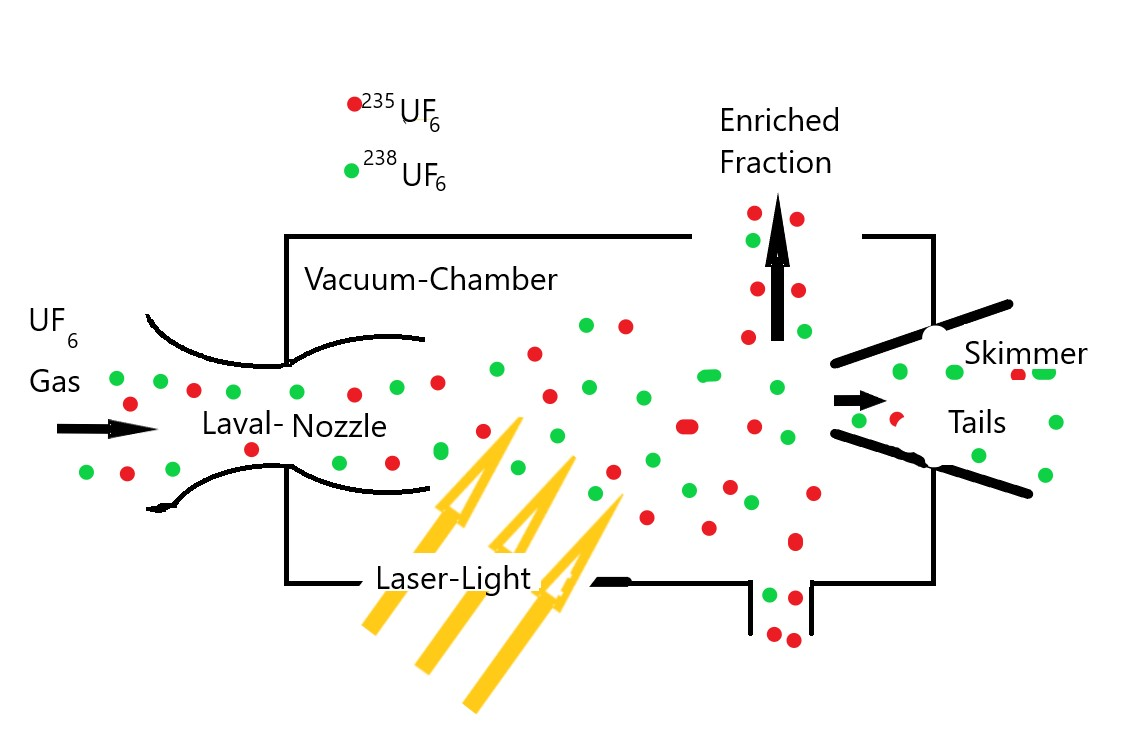
Schematic of a stage of an isotope separation plant for uranium enrichment with laser. An infrared laser with a wavelength of approx. 16 μm radiates at a high repetition rate onto a UF_{6} carrier gas mixture, which flows supersonically out of a laval nozzle. The excited component moves away from the axis of the molecular beam faster than the unexcited tailings stream which is separated at a skimmer.

The shortest-wavelength fundamental vibration of gaseous UF_{6} is ~16 μm. At room temperature its width (around 20 cm^{−1}) is much larger than the isotopic shift (0.6 cm^{−1}). The broadening is due to thermally populated excited vibrational and rotational states. To allow for selective excitation, UF_{6}, diluted about 100x by a carrier gas (argon or nitrogen), is cooled to about 80 K by adiabatic expansion through a nozzle into vacuum. Initially, collisions occur (which are necessary for cooling). But after traveling about 10 nozzle diameters, due to the expansion, they are so rare that condensation no longer takes place. Avoiding collisions is necessary to suppress collisional transfer of energy between the isotopes. Such a molecular beam method is used where spectral narrowing is needed for selective excitation.

With SILEX, the pressure and nozzle diameter are large enough to provide a sufficient number of collisions immediately after the nozzle, to allow for formation of clusters (UF_{6}•G) with carrier gas G. (UF_{6}•UF_{6} clusters are practically not formed due to the much lower density of UF_{6} compared to G.) If ^{235}UF_{6} is selectively excited at 628.3 cm^{−1}, this molecule does not aggregate with G, whereas the nonexcited heavier ^{238}UF_{6} does. Due to their higher thermal velocity, the free molecules leave the axis of the molecular beam faster than the clusters. The latter are therefore enriched in the part transmitted by a skimmer nozzle downstream, while the non-transmitted fraction is enriched in the ^{235}UF_{6}. The enrichment factor is better, the larger the transmitted fraction (i.e. the smaller the depletion and the smaller the cut). SILEX uses a separation nozzle, modified by a laser and profiting from selective repression of cluster formation ("condensation").

For that, the CO_{2} laser needs at least 20 MW. With a Raman shift of 354.3 cm^{−1} and a CO_{2} laser wavenumber of 982.1 cm^{−1} (10R30 line), one receives 627.8 cm^{−1}. This is close to the Q-branch of ^{235}UF_{6} (center at 628.3 cm^{−1}, width 0.01 cm^{−1}) and is closer to the Q-branch of ^{238}UF_{6}. GLE does not publish how they accomplish the necessary fine tuning. High-pressure CO_{2} lasers would cause additional problems with the pulse repetition rate. With common (atmospheric-pressure) CO_{2} lasers and with the stimulated Raman shifter, the state of technology is 2–4 kHz. In order not to leave large parts of the molecular beam unirradiated, one needs at least 20 kHz (according to Urenco several tens of kHz), unless pulsed nozzles are used. The nozzles must have slit form, in order to provide enough absorption length.

GLE states that they reach separation factors of 2–20. The higher values are likely coupled to poorer depletion (which is not explained). This is sufficient for enrichment from natural uranium (0.72 % ^{235}U) to reactor grade (> 3% ^{235}U). The pioneer works of the van den Bergh group obtained much smaller enrichments with SF_{6}.

Using lasers with suitable wavelengths, SILEX can enrich elements such as chlorine, molybdenum, carbon and silicon.

== Proliferation concerns ==
Compared to alternative enrichment technologies, SILEX achieves higher enrichment levels. Fewer stages are necessary to reach weapons-grade uranium (> 90% ^{235}U). According to GLE, each stage requires as little as 25% of the space of centrifuge methods. It could enable rogue governments to more easily conceal enrichment facilities. The appeal is further enhanced by claims from GLE that a SILEX plant is faster and cheaper to build and consumes less energy. Scientists have therefore repeatedly expressed their concerns that SILEX could create an easy path towards a nuclear weapon.

== Security classification ==
In June 2001, DOE classified "certain privately generated information concerning an innovative isotope separation process for enriching uranium". Under the Atomic Energy Act, all information not specifically declassified is classified as Restricted Data, whether it is privately or publicly held. This is in marked distinction to the national security classification executive order, which states that classification can only be assigned to information "owned by, produced by or for, or is under the control of the United States Government". This is the only known case in which the Atomic Energy Act is used in such a manner.

== Popular culture ==
The 2014 Australian Broadcasting Corporation drama The Code uses "Laser Uranium Enrichment" as a plot device. Protagonist Sophie Walsh states that the technology will be smaller, less energy-intensive, and more difficult to control once it becomes a viable alternative. Walsh also states that development has been protracted, and that significant governmental interests work to maintain the classified status of the technology.
