= Molecular laser isotope separation =

Molecular laser isotope separation (MLIS) is a method of isotope separation, where specially tuned lasers are used to separate isotopes of uranium using selective ionization of hyperfine transitions of uranium hexafluoride molecules. It is similar to Atomic vapor laser isotope separation (AVLIS). Its main advantage over AVLIS is low energy consumption and use of uranium hexafluoride instead of vaporized uranium. MLIS was conceived in 1971 at the Los Alamos National Laboratory.

MLIS operates in cascade setup, like the gaseous diffusion process. Instead of vaporized uranium as in AVLIS the working medium of the MLIS is uranium hexafluoride which requires a much lower temperature to vaporize. The UF_{6} gas is mixed with a suitable carrier gas (a noble gas including some hydrogen) which allows the molecules to remain in the gaseous phase after being cooled by expansion through a supersonic de Laval nozzle. A scavenger gas (e.g. methane) is also included in the mixture to bind with the fluorine atoms after they are dissociated from the UF_{6} and inhibit their recombination with the enriched UF_{5} product.

In the first stage, the expanded and cooled stream of UF_{6} is irradiated with an infrared laser operating at the wavelength of 16 μm. The mix is then irradiated with another laser, either infrared or ultraviolet, whose photons are selectively absorbed by the excited ^{235}UF_{6}, causing its photolysis to ^{235}UF_{5} and fluorine. The resultant enriched UF_{5} forms a solid which is then separated from the gas by filtration or by cyclonic separation. The precipitated UF_{5} is relatively enriched with ^{235}UF_{5} and after conversion back to UF_{6} it is fed to the next stage of the cascade to be further enriched.

The laser for the excitation is usually a carbon dioxide laser with output wavelength shifted from 10.6 μm to 16 μm; the photolysis laser may be a XeCl excimer laser operating at 308 nm, however, infrared lasers are mostly used in existing implementations.

The process is complex: many mixed UFx compounds are formed which contaminate the product and are difficult to remove. The United States, France, United Kingdom, Germany and South Africa have reported the termination of their MLIS programs; however, Japan still has a small-scale program in operation.

The Commonwealth Scientific and Industrial Research Organisation in Australia has developed the Separation of isotopes by laser excitation (SILEX) pulsed laser separation process. GE, Cameco and Hitachi are currently involved in developing it for commercial use.

== See also ==
- Australian Atomic Energy Commission
- Calutron
- Nuclear fuel cycle
- Nuclear power
