= Uranium pentafluoride =

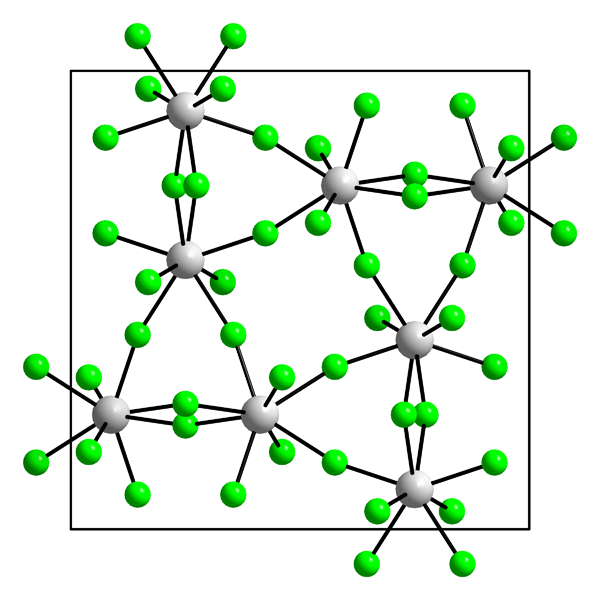
- β form

Identifiers
CAS Number	13775-07-0
3D model (JSmol)	Interactive image
ChemSpider	75545
ECHA InfoCard	100.033.991
EC Number	237-405-9
PubChem CID	83723
UNII	VG7WW26FTQ
CompTox Dashboard (EPA)	DTXSID7065625
- InChI: InChI=1S/5FH.U/h5*1H;/q;;;;; 5/p-5 Key: JNVYCANIFQDNST-UHFFFAOYSA-I; InChI=1/5FH.U/h5*1H;/q;;;;;+2/p-5 Key: YKLDBRIIJYAXGS-AACRGIKGAA
- SMILES: [U+5].[F-].[F-].[F-].[F-].[F-]

Properties
Chemical formula	UF_{5}
Molar mass	333.02 g/mol
Appearance	Pale yellow crystalline solid
Density	5.823 g/cm^{3} (alpha polymorph)
- Except where otherwise noted, data are given for materials in their standard state (at 25 °C [77 °F], 100 kPa). verify (what is ?) Infobox references

Uranium pentafluoride is the inorganic compound with the chemical formula UF_{5}. It is a pale yellow paramagnetic solid. The compound has attracted interest because it is related to uranium hexafluoride, which is widely used to produce uranium fuel. It crystallizes in two polymorphs, called α- and β-UF_{5}.

== Synthesis and structure ==
Uranium pentafluoride is an intermediate in the conversion of uranium tetrafluoride to volatile UF_{6}:

2 UF_{4} + F_{2} → 2 UF_{5}
2 UF_{5} + F_{2} → 2 UF_{6}

It can be produced by reduction of the hexafluoride with carbon monoxide at elevated temperatures.

2 UF_{6} + CO → 2 UF_{5} + COF_{2}

Other reducing agents have been examined.

It can also be produced by various molecular laser isotope separation methods.

The α form is a linear coordination polymer consisting of chains of octahedral uranium centers in which one of the five fluoride anion forms a bridge to the next uranium atom. The structure is reminiscent of that for vanadium pentafluoride.

In the β form, the uranium centers adopt a square antiprismatic structure. The β polymorph gradually converts to α at 130 °C.

== Monomeric UF_{5} ==
Of theoretical interest, molecular UF_{5} can be generated as a transient monomer by UV-photolysis of uranium hexafluoride. It is thought to adopt a square pyramidal geometry.

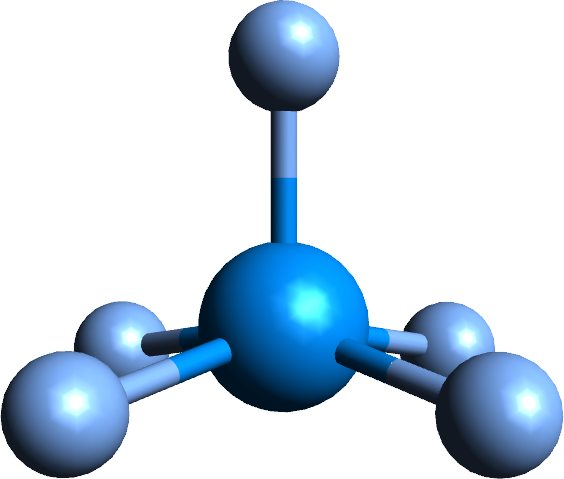
Structure of molecular UF_{5}.
