= Tunable laser =

Laser with a variable wavelength

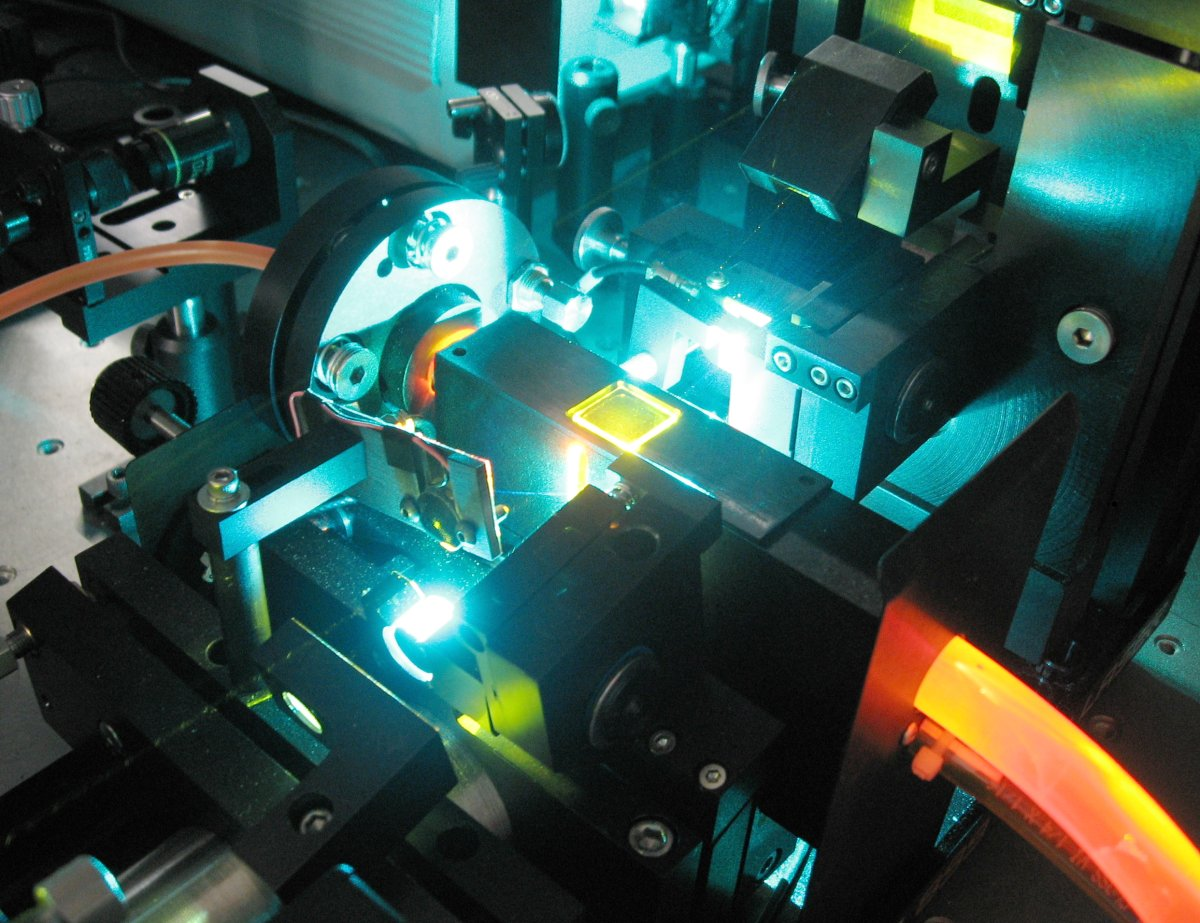
CW dye laser based on Rhodamine 6G. The dye laser is considered to be the first broadly tunable laser.

A tunable laser is a laser whose wavelength of operation can be altered in a controlled manner. While all laser gain media allow small shifts in output wavelength, only some types of lasers allow continuous tuning over a significant wavelength range.

There are many types and categories of tunable lasers. They exist in the gas, liquid, and solid states. Among the types of tunable lasers are excimer lasers, gas lasers (such as CO_{2} and helium–neon laser lasers), dye lasers (liquid and solid state), transition-metal solid-state lasers, semiconductor crystal and diode lasers, and free-electron lasers. Tunable lasers find applications in spectroscopy, photochemistry, atomic vapor laser isotope separation, and optical communications.

== Types of tunability ==
=== Single-line tuning ===
No real laser is truly monochromatic; all lasers can emit light over some range of frequencies, known as the linewidth of the laser transition. In most lasers, this linewidth is quite narrow (for example, the 1,064 nm wavelength transition of a Nd:YAG laser has a linewidth of approximately 120 GHz, or 0.45 nm). Tuning of the laser output across this range can be achieved by placing wavelength-selective optical elements (such as an etalon) into the laser's optical cavity, to provide selection of a particular longitudinal mode of the cavity.

=== Multi-line tuning ===
Most laser gain media have a number of transition wavelengths on which laser operation can be achieved. For example, as well as the principal 1,064 nm output line, Nd:YAG has weaker transitions at wavelengths of 1,052 nm, 1,074 nm, 1,112 nm, 1,319 nm, and a number of other lines. Usually, these lines do not operate unless the gain of the strongest transition is suppressed, such as by use of wavelength-selective dielectric mirrors. If a dispersive element, such as a prism, is introduced into the optical cavity, tilting the cavity's mirrors can cause tuning of the laser as it "hops" between different laser lines. Such schemes are common in argon-ion lasers, allowing tuning of the laser to a number of lines from the ultraviolet and blue through to green wavelengths.

=== Narrowband tuning ===
For some types of lasers, the laser's cavity length can be modified, and thus they can be continuously tuned over a significant wavelength range. Distributed feedback (DFB) semiconductor lasers and vertical-cavity surface-emitting lasers (VCSELs) use periodic distributed Bragg reflector (DBR) structures to form the mirrors of the optical cavity. If the temperature of the laser is changed, then the index change of the DBR structure causes a shift in its peak reflective wavelength and thus the wavelength of the laser. The tuning range of such lasers is typically a few nanometres, up to a maximum of approximately 6 nm, as the laser temperature is changed over ~50 K. As a rule of thumb, the wavelength is tuned by 0.08 nm/K for DFB lasers operating in the 1,550 nm wavelength regime. Such lasers are commonly used in optical communications applications, such as DWDM-systems, to allow adjustment of the signal wavelength. To get wideband tuning using this technique, some such as Santur Corporation or Nippon Telegraph and Telephone (NTT Corporation) contain an array of such lasers on a single chip and concatenate the tuning ranges.

=== Widely tunable lasers ===
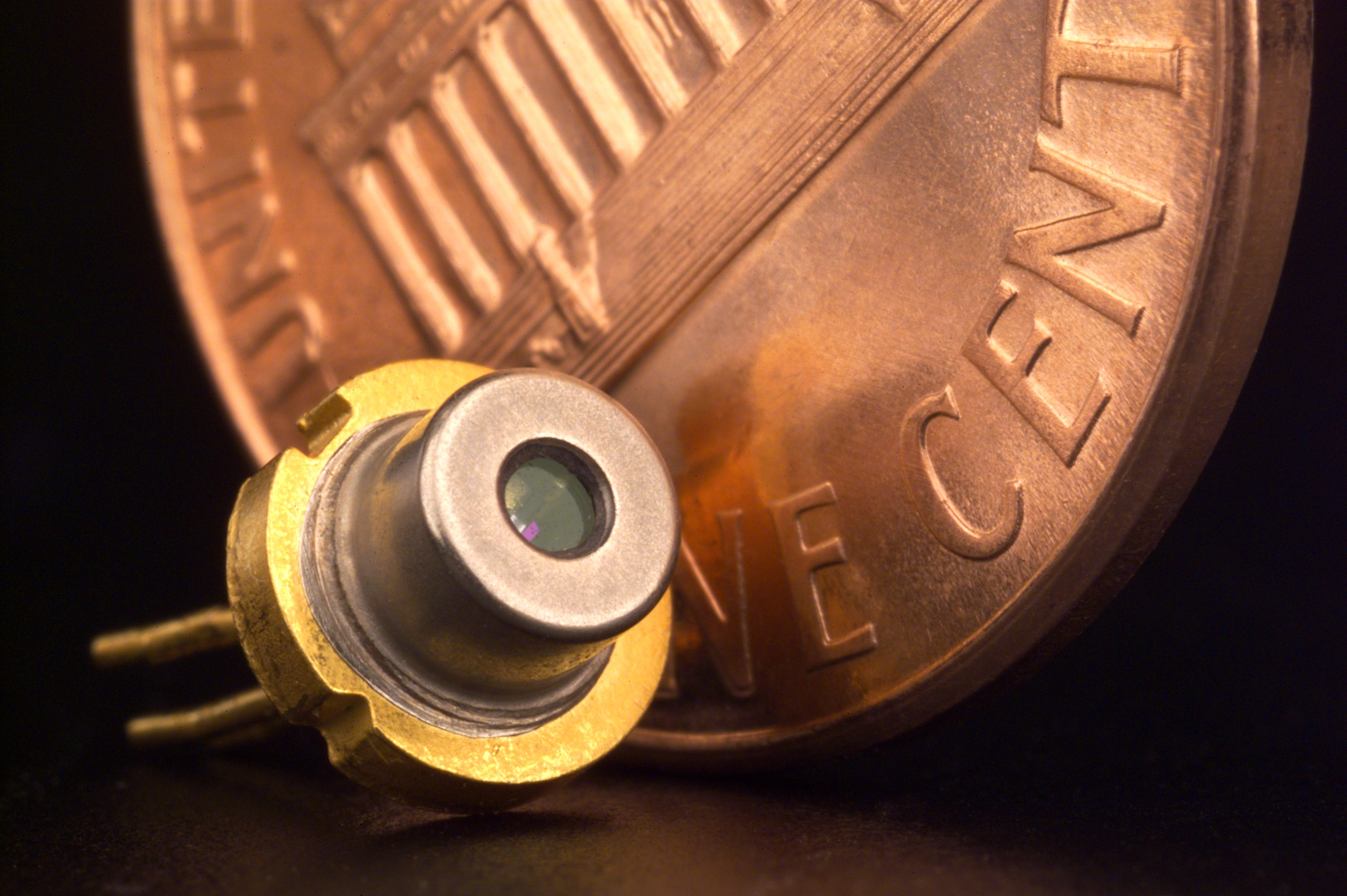
A typical laser diode. When mounted with external optics, these lasers can be tuned mainly in the red and near-infrared.

Sample Grating Distributed Bragg Reflector lasers (SG-DBR) have a much larger tunable range; by the use of vernier-tunable Bragg mirrors and a phase section, a single-mode output range of > 50 nm can be selected. Other technologies to achieve wide tuning ranges for DWDM-systems are:

- External cavity lasers using a MEMS structure for tuning the cavity length, such as devices commercialized by Iolon.
- External cavity lasers using multiple-prism grating arrangements for wide-range tunability.
- DFB laser arrays based on several thermal tuned DFB lasers, in which coarse tuning is achieved by selecting the correct laser bar. Fine tuning is then done thermally, such as in devices commercialized by Santur Corporation.
- Tunable VCSELs, in which one of the two mirror stacks is movable. To achieve sufficient output power out of a VCSEL structure, lasers in the 1,550 nm domain are usually either optically pumped or have an additional optical amplifier built into the device.

Rather than placing the resonator mirrors at the edges of the device, the mirrors in a VCSEL are located on the top and bottom of the semiconductor material. Somewhat confusingly, these mirrors are typically DBR devices. This arrangement causes light to "bounce" vertically in a laser chip, so that the light emerges through the top of the device, rather than through the edge. As a result, VCSELs produce beams of a more circular nature than their cousins and beams that do not diverge as rapidly.

As of December 2008, there is no widely tunable VCSEL commercially available any more for DWDM-system application.

It is claimed that the first infrared laser with a tunability of more than one octave was a germanium crystal laser.

=== Applications ===
The range of applications of tunable lasers is extremely wide. When coupled to the right filter, a tunable source can be tuned over a few hundreds of nanometers with a spectral resolution that can go from 4 nm to 0.3 nm, depending on the wavelength range. With a good enough isolation (>OD4), tunable sources can be used for basic absorption and photoluminescence studies. They can be used for solar cells characterisation in a light-beam-induced current (LBIC) experiment, from which the external quantum efficiency (EQE) of a device can be mapped. They can also be used for the characterisation of gold nanoparticles and single-walled carbon nanotube thermopiles, where a wide tunable range from 400 nm to 1,000 nm is essential. Tunable sources were recently used for the development of hyperspectral imaging for early detection of retinal diseases where a wide range of wavelengths, a small bandwidth, and outstanding isolation is needed to achieve efficient illumination of the entire retina. Tunable sources can be a powerful tool for reflection and transmission spectroscopy, photobiology, detector calibration, hyperspectral imaging, and steady-state pump probe experiments, to name only a few.

=== History ===
The first true broadly tunable laser was the dye laser in 1966. Hänsch introduced the first narrow-linewidth tunable laser in 1972. Dye lasers and some vibronic solid-state lasers have extremely large bandwidths, allowing tuning over a range of tens to hundreds of nanometres. Titanium-doped sapphire is the most common tunable solid-state laser, capable of laser operation from 670 nm to 1,100 nm wavelengths. Typically these laser systems incorporate a Lyot filter into the laser cavity, which is rotated to tune the laser. Other tuning techniques involve diffraction gratings, prisms, etalons, and combinations of these. Multiple-prism grating arrangements, in several configurations, as described by Duarte, are used in diode, dye, gas, and other tunable lasers.

== See also ==
- Bubble laser
- Dye laser
- Excimer laser
- Free-electron laser
- Laser diode
- Liquid-crystal laser
- Mode-locking
- Multiple-prism grating laser oscillator
- Optical parametric amplifier
- Organic laser
