= Niska Gas Storage Partners =

- Company type: Public
- Traded as: NYSE: NKA
- Industry: Gas Utilities
- Founded: 2006
- Headquarters: Houston, Texas
- Revenue: ▼$185.91 Million (As of 2013)
- Number of employees: 133
- Website: http://www.niskapartners.com

Niska Gas Storage Partners is a global gas storage service provider and the largest gas storage firm in North America. It operates business in Alberta, Canada and California, US and Oklahoma. The company owns a natural gas storage capacity of 225.5 billion cubic feet. It generates revenue by charging monthly natural gas storage fees to a variety of customers including institutions, gas generators, etc. AECO Hub, consisting of three sub-facilities located both in Canada and US, is the core storage facility of the company and is one of the most important natural gas producing sites in North America. The company has a market capitalization of $1.05 billion and an enterprise value of 1.05 billion.

== History ==
The company name is the Cree word niska, meaning "Canada goose", indicating the company’s root as the Canadian developer of the first major trading point for natural gas in Alberta.

In the early 2000s, the company acquired the former Manchester Gas Storage facility in Oklahoma, which was renamed Salt Plains Gas Storage, which is one of the three facilities that make up for AECO Hub. The company operated its business under the name, Niska Gas Storage, in 2006 when the natural gas storage business was acquired by Riverstone Holdings LLC. Four years later, the company launched an initial public offering
