= NeoPhotonics Corporation =

American optical technology company

- Company type: Subsidiary
- Traded as: NYSE: NPTN
- Founded: 1996; 30 years ago
- Headquarters: San Jose, California, United States
- Key people: Timothy S. Jenks (Chairman, CEO & President)
- Parent: Lumentum Holdings Inc.
- Website: www.neophotonics.com

NeoPhotonics Corporation was an American public corporation based in San Jose, California, and founded in 1996. The company developed, manufactured and sold optoelectronic products that transmit, receive and switch high speed digital optical signals for communications networks, These products included transceivers, tunable lasers, high bandwidth receivers, optical semiconductors, photonic integrated circuits, and 100 gigabit per second and above modules."

NeoPhotonics products primarily implement coherent technology and include those designed for 100G and beyond data rates, such as at 200G, 400G and 600G, for telecom and datacenter or content provider networks and applications. The company's high speed 100G and beyond coherent products are based on Advanced Hybrid Photonic Integration technology.

Applications in coherent transmission use not only amplitude but also phase and polarization to increase data rates tenfold or more over conventional “on-off” transmission protocols. Coherent transmission is also necessary for next-generation flexible and efficient switching of signals individual wavelength without conflict or contention between wavelengths in an optical network, such as Software Defined Networks. Coherent transmission has become the technology of choice for the most advanced high speed telecommunications networks today.

Revenues from the company's high speed products have grown rapidly due to the rapid expansion of telecom backbone and content provider networks accommodating increased mobile traffic. Initial adoption of the company's 100G coherent products were in the Long Haul market sector, over the next several years it is expect that growth in 100G and beyond will be mainly driven by adoption of 100G coherent products in the much larger Metro market sector and the datacenter market for large web-scale data network market.

NeoPhotonics Corporation was listed on the New York Stock Exchange under the ticker symbol NPTN.

== History ==
The company was co-founded by Chinese-born Sean Bi and Japanese-born Nobuyuki Kambe in 1996. The two men were introduced by one of Bi's professors at the Massachusetts Institute of Technology (MIT). Meanwhile, the company received an initial investment of US$1 million from Pete Thomas at Institutional Venture Partners. The company was initially called NanoGram Corporation, and pursued development of technologies and applications using inorganic nanomaterials. The company changed its name to NeoPhotonics Corporation in 2002.

At that time, and according to Forbes, in 2002, in the midst of the tech bubble, the company was reorganized into three companies: NanoGram Devices, which kept the battery-making technology for medical devices; NeoPhotonics, which went after the optical devices market; and a third firm, NanoGram Corp., which initially managed the intellectual property and then further developed optical and polymer films using nanomaterials. It also received US$35 million from investors in 2002. In early 2003 the company acquired Lightwave Microsystems, a manufacturer of silica-on-silica passive integrated optical products. Late that year, again in 2003, the company filed for reorganization under bankruptcy. Shortly thereafter, after completing their reorganization and exiting bankruptcy, the company sold NanoGram Devices for approximately US$45 million to Greatbatch Technologies.

In 2005, the company acquired ownership in Photon Technology Co., Ltd., a Chinese manufacturer of optoelectric devices and modules, based in Shenzhen, China. By 2006 it had acquired most of Photon's outstanding shares. In the following years, NeoPhotonics further acquired optical component companies Optun, Inc., Lightconnect, Inc., BeamExpress, Inc., Santur, Inc., LAPIS Semiconductor Co., previously known as OKI Semiconductor Co. (optical unit), and Paxera Corp. It also purchased the tunable laser and transceiver product lines of EMCORE.

The company completed is initial public offering (IPO) on the New York Stock Exchange on February 2, 2011. As of October 2016, the market capitalization of NeoPhotonics Corporation was approximately $700 million.

As of June 2016, the company owned approximately 550 US patents and 100 patents overseas. The company operates manufacturing in Silicon Valley, California; Tokyo, Japan; and Shenzhen, China.

In August 2022, NeoPhotonics was acquired by Lumentum for $918 million.
