= Oak Ridge nuclear facility =

Oak Ridge nuclear facility may refer to one of several active or historical U.S. federal government facilities in Oak Ridge, Tennessee, including:

- Clinton Engineer Works, the complex of production facilities at Oak Ridge during the World War II Manhattan Project, superseded by the following:
- K-25/K-27, facility for uranium enrichment by gaseous diffusion during World War II and for many years thereafter
  - S-50, conducted uranium enrichment by thermal diffusion during the Manhattan Project
- Oak Ridge National Laboratory, a U.S. Department of Energy multipurpose national laboratory and the site of several active and historical nuclear energy projects
  - X-10 Graphite Reactor, on the Oak Ridge National Laboratory campus, built during World War II and the first reactor designed and built for continuous operation
- Y-12 National Security Complex, conducted uranium enrichment during World War II, more recently used for nuclear weapons production and management of highly enriched uranium
