= Oak Ridge atomic plant =

"Oak Ridge atomic plant" may refer to one of several different facilities in Oak Ridge, Tennessee, including:

- Oak Ridge National Laboratory
- K-25
- S-50 (Manhattan Project)
- Y-12 National Security Complex
