= Ross Gunn =

American physicist

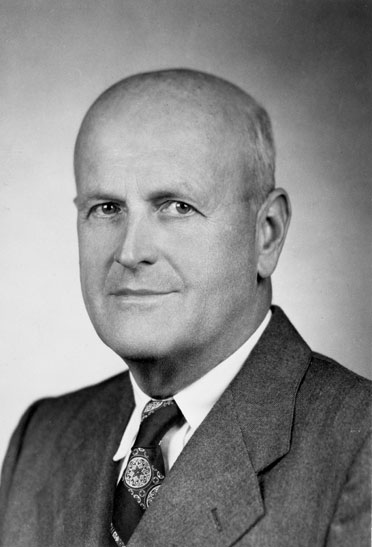
- Born: May 12, 1897; Cleveland, Ohio
- Died: October 15, 1966 (aged 69); Washington, D.C.
- Education: Oberlin College; University of Michigan; Yale University
- Known for: Development of nuclear powered submarines
- Awards: Navy Distinguished Civilian Service Award (1945)
- Scientific career
- Workplaces: Naval Research Laboratory; United States Weather Bureau
- Thesis: Three New Methods in Electrical Measurements (1926)

Ross Gunn (May 12, 1897 – October 15, 1966) was an American physicist who worked on the Manhattan Project during World War II. The New York Times described him as "one of the true fathers of the nuclear submarine program".

From 1927 to 1947, Gunn worked at the Naval Research Laboratory. He was the author of over 28 papers, and received 45 patents. He designed radio devices for controlling aircraft, which were used in the development of the first drones. He was one of the first to appreciate the possibility of using nuclear power for submarine propulsion. During World War II he was involved in the development of thermal diffusion technology for isotope separation.

After the war Gunn became director of the Weather Bureau's Physical Research Division, where he carried out a series of studies into atmospheric phenomena. In 1958 he became a professor of physics at American University, a position he held until his death in 1966.

== Early life ==
Ross Gunn was born in Cleveland, Ohio, on May 12, 1897, the son of R. D. A. Gunn, a physician, and his wife Lora Conner Gunn. He was one of four children, with an older brother and sister and a younger brother. His parents also had a set of twins who died at birth. When he was seven years old, the family moved to Oberlin, Ohio, where his father had a medical practice. He attended Oberlin High School, from which he graduated in 1915, and then attended Oberlin College for two years. As a teenager, he was interested in amateur radio, which in those days meant building as well as operating your own set. During summer vacations he worked as a radio operator on the SS Seeandbee, a passenger ship on the Great Lakes, and for the Glenn L. Martin Company. After two years at Oberlin, he transferred to the University of Michigan because it had a better electrical engineering program.

When the United States entered World War I in 1917, Gunn enlisted in the United States Army Signal Corps, but remained at the University of Michigan as a military radio instructor. He returned to his studies when the war ended, his income supplemented by work as an instructor, and received his Bachelor of Science in Electrical Engineering (BSEE) degree from the University of Michigan in 1920. He then studied physics there, earning a Master of Science (MS) in 1921. He started work on his doctorate, but became bored, and accepted an offer from the Army to work at McCook Field as an aircraft radio research engineer. He developed various forms of aircraft instrumentation, participated in a number of cross-country instrument flights, and designed radio devices for controlling aircraft, for which he received the first of 45 patents that he would eventually accumulate. These were used in the development of the first drones, which were used as practice targets for antiaircraft gunnery.

In September 1923, Gunn married Gladys J. Rowley, an Oberlin College alumna. They had four sons: Ross Jr., Leigh, Charles and Robert Burns. The experience at McCook convinced him that he had been too hasty in abandoning his studies, so that year he quit to take a job as an instructor at Yale University, where he was placed in charge of the High Frequency laboratory at the physics department. He earned his doctorate there in 1926, writing his thesis on "Three New Methods in Electrical Measurements".

== Naval Research Laboratory ==
In August 1927, Gunn accepted a position with the Naval Research Laboratory (NRL), becoming assistant superintendent of the Heat and Light Division in 1928. This was a prolific period for him. Between 1929 and 1933, he published 28 papers, including 13 in the Physical Review. He could choose his own topics of research, and chose to study natural phenomena such as cosmic rays and terrestrial and solar magnetism. In 1933, he became superintendent of the Mechanics and Electricity Division and technical adviser to the laboratory director.

The 1938 discovery of nuclear fission aroused great interest among physicists. On March 17, 1939, Enrico Fermi gave a presentation to the Navy on the state of nuclear research, and the possibility of the development of atomic bombs and nuclear power. Gunn was in attendance as the NRL representative. Gunn was impressed by the possibility of utilizing nuclear power to propel ships, particularly submarines, as nuclear power would not require oxygen. On March 20, Gunn and the director of the NRL, Captain Hollis M. Cooley, approached Rear Admiral Harold G. Bowen, Sr., the head of the Bureau of Engineering, which controlled funding for the NRL, with a request for $1,500 for research into uranium. This was approved; the Navy's program predated the Army's Manhattan Project by seven months.

Niels Bohr had theorized that only the uranium-235 isotope was fissile, so the first step was to determine a means of separating it from the more abundant uranium-238. The NRL placed contracts with universities to study four different methods of isotope separation: gaseous diffusion, ultra centrifuge, mass spectrograph, and thermal diffusion. Thermal diffusion was not initially regarded as very promising, but Gunn was impressed by Philip Abelson's efforts on it. He recruited Abelson, who became a Navy employee in June 1941, and the Navy pressed ahead with thermal diffusion, constructing a pilot plant at Anacostia in June 1941. Gunn was a member of the Uranium Committee that coordinated the early Army, Navy and civilian research efforts, but as the Manhattan Project ramped up in 1942, the NRL effort became dwarfed and sidelined, and the NRL was no longer informed of the Army's progress.

The thermal diffusion effort continued, however. In June 1944, the Manhattan Project decided to take it up, and constructed the S-50 thermal diffusion plant at the Clinton Engineer Works in Oak Ridge, Tennessee. Although incapable of producing weapons grade uranium, S-50 was able to produce slightly enriched uranium, which was then fed into K-25 and Y-12 for further enrichment by gaseous diffusion or the electromagnetic process. S-50 was credited with shortening World War II by eight days. Gunn was awarded the Navy Distinguished Civilian Service Award by the Secretary of the Navy, James Forrestal, on September 4, 1945. His citation read:

For exceptionally distinguished service to the United States Navy in the field of scientific research and in particular by reason of his outstanding contribution to the development of the atomic bomb ... For his untiring devotion to this most urgent project, Dr. Gunn has distinguished himself in a manner richly deserving of the Navy’s highest civilian award.

Once the war was over, Gunn returned to the proposal to use nuclear energy to power submarines. He organized a symposium at NRL on November 19, 1945. Papers were presented that argued that nuclear powered submarines would be able to operate submerged for years without refueling. The possibility of firing ballistic missiles from submerged submarines was also raised. Bowen and Commodore Deak Parsons arranged for naval personnel, including Hyman Rickover, to be assigned to the Manhattan Project to learn about the new technology. This would lead to the nuclear navy that Gunn had envisioned.

== Later life ==
Gunn left the NRL for the United States Weather Bureau in February 1947. Although he had only a small staff and limited funds, he carried out a series of studies into atmospheric phenomena. He was director of the United States Air Force-Weather Bureau Cloud Physics Project from 1947 to 1949, and was a member of the Air Force's Scientific Advisory Board from 1948 to 1953. He was also a consultant for the United States Atomic Energy Commission from 1958 to 1965. His interest in atmospheric physics continued after 1958, when he left the Weather Bureau to become a research professor in physics at the American University in Washington, DC. He remained in this job until his death there on October 15, 1966.
