= K-25 =

Manhattan Project codename for a program to produce enriched uranium

Coordinates: 35°55′56″N 84°23′42″W

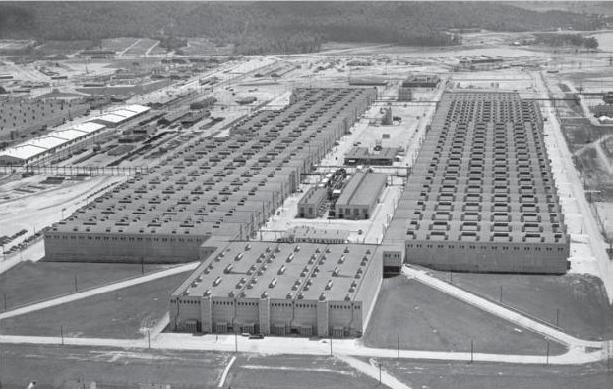
The K-25 building of the Oak Ridge Gaseous Diffusion Plant aerial view, looking southeast. The mile-long building, in the shape of a "U", was completely demolished in 2013.

K-25 was the codename given by the Manhattan Project to the program to produce enriched uranium for atomic bombs using the gaseous diffusion method. Originally the codename for the product, over time it came to refer to the project, the production facility located at the Clinton Engineer Works in Oak Ridge, Tennessee, the main gaseous diffusion building, and ultimately the site. When it was built in 1944, the four-story K-25 gaseous diffusion plant was the world's largest building, comprising over 5,264,000 square feet (489,000 m^{2}) of floor space and a volume of 97,500,000 cubic feet (2,760,000 m^{3}).

Construction of the K-25 facility was undertaken by J. A. Jones Construction. At the height of construction, over 25,000 workers were employed on the site. Gaseous diffusion was but one of three enrichment technologies used by the Manhattan Project. Slightly enriched product from the S-50 thermal diffusion plant was fed into the K-25 gaseous diffusion plant. Its product in turn was fed into the Y-12 electromagnetic plant. The enriched uranium was used in the Little Boy atomic bomb used in the atomic bombing of Hiroshima. In 1946, the K-25 gaseous diffusion plant became capable of producing highly enriched product.

After the war, four more gaseous diffusion plants named K-27, K-29, K-31 and K-33 were added to the site. The K-25 site was renamed the Oak Ridge Gaseous Diffusion Plant in 1955. Production of enriched uranium ended in 1964, and gaseous diffusion finally ceased on the site on 27 August 1985. The Oak Ridge Gaseous Diffusion Plant was renamed the Oak Ridge K-25 Site in 1989 and the East Tennessee Technology Park in 1996. Demolition of all five gaseous diffusion plants was completed in February 2017.

== Background ==
The discovery of the neutron by James Chadwick in 1932, followed by that of nuclear fission in uranium by German chemists Otto Hahn and Fritz Strassmann in 1938, and its theoretical explanation (and naming) by Lise Meitner and Otto Frisch soon after, opened up the possibility of a controlled nuclear chain reaction with uranium. At the Pupin Laboratories at Columbia University, Enrico Fermi and Leo Szilard began exploring how this might be achieved. Fears that a German atomic bomb project would develop atomic weapons first, especially among scientists who were refugees from Nazi Germany and other fascist countries, were expressed in the Einstein–Szilard letter to the President of the United States, Franklin D. Roosevelt. This prompted Roosevelt to initiate preliminary research in late 1939.

Niels Bohr and John Archibald Wheeler applied the liquid-drop model of the atomic nucleus to explain the mechanism of nuclear fission. As the experimental physicists studied fission, they uncovered puzzling results. George Placzek asked Bohr why uranium seemed to fission with both fast and slow neutrons. Walking to a meeting with Wheeler, Bohr had an insight that the fission at low energies was caused by the uranium-235 isotope, while at high energies it was mainly a reaction with the far more abundant uranium-238 isotope. The former makes up just 0.714 percent of the uranium atoms in natural uranium, about one in every 140; natural uranium is 99.28 percent uranium-238. There is also a tiny amount of uranium-234, which accounts for just 0.006 percent.

At Columbia, John R. Dunning believed this was the case, but Fermi was not so sure. The only way to settle this was to obtain a sample of uranium-235 and test it. He had Alfred O. C. Nier from the University of Minnesota prepare samples of uranium enriched in uranium-234, 235 and 238 using a mass spectrometer. These were ready in February 1940, and Dunning, Eugene T. Booth and Aristid von Grosse then carried out a series of experiments. They demonstrated that uranium-235 was indeed primarily responsible for fission with slow neutrons, but they were unable to determine precise neutron capture cross sections because their samples were not sufficiently enriched.

At the University of Birmingham in Britain, the Australian physicist Mark Oliphant assigned two refugee physicists—Otto Frisch and Rudolf Peierls—the task of investigating the feasibility of an atomic bomb, ironically because their status as enemy aliens precluded their working on secret projects like radar. Their March 1940 Frisch–Peierls memorandum indicated that the critical mass of uranium-235 was within an order of magnitude of 10 kilograms (22 lb), which was small enough to be carried by a bomber aircraft of the day.

== Gaseous diffusion ==
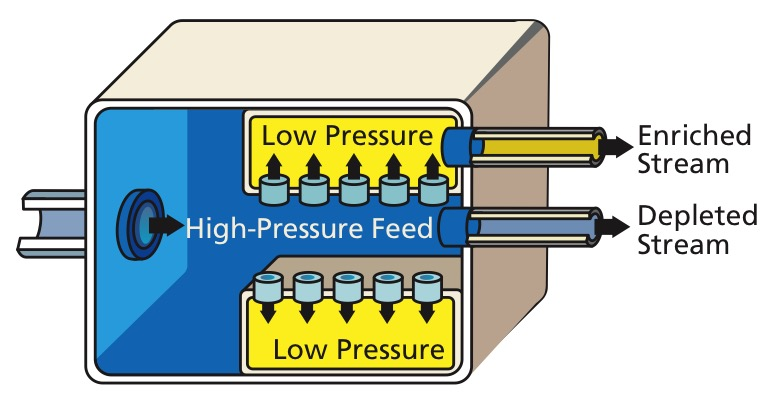
Gaseous diffusion uses semi-permeable membranes to separate enriched uranium.

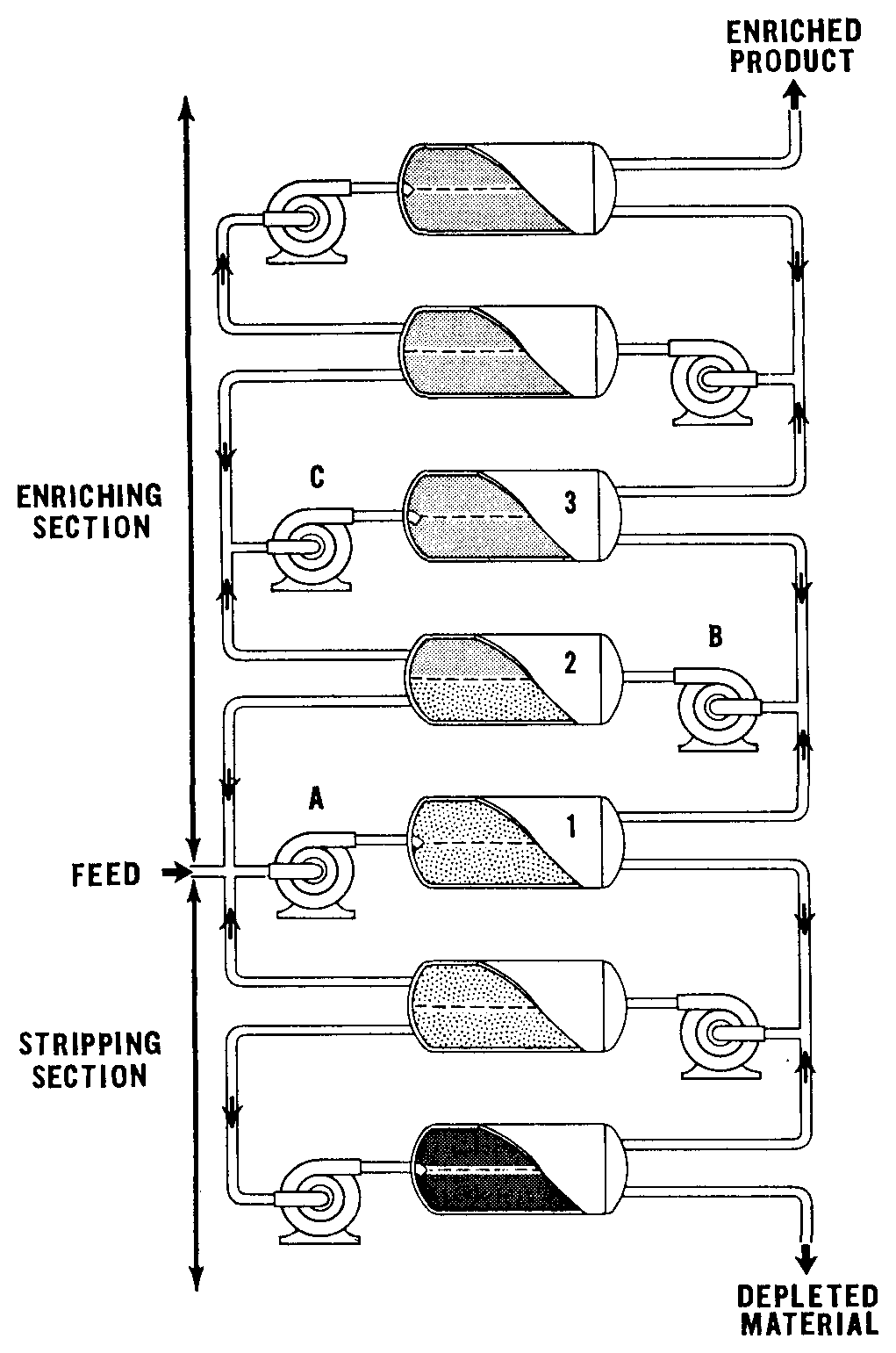
Stages are connected together to form a cascade. A, B and C are pumps.

In April 1940, Jesse Beams, Ross Gunn, Fermi, Nier, Merle Tuve and Harold Urey had a meeting at the American Physical Society in Washington, D.C. At the time, the prospect of building an atomic bomb seemed dim, and even creating a chain reaction would likely require enriched uranium. They therefore recommended that research be conducted with the aim of developing the means to separate kilogram amounts of uranium-235. At a lunch on 21 May 1940, George B. Kistiakowsky suggested the possibility of using gaseous diffusion.

Gaseous diffusion is based on Graham's law, which states that the rate of effusion of a gas through a porous barrier is inversely proportional to the square root of the gas's molecular mass. In a container with a porous barrier containing a mixture of two gases, the lighter molecules will pass out of the container more rapidly than the heavier molecules. The gas leaving the container is slightly enriched in the lighter molecules, while the residual gas is slightly depleted. A container wherein the enrichment process takes place through gaseous diffusion is called a diffuser.

Gaseous diffusion had been used to separate isotopes before. Francis William Aston had used it to partially separate isotopes of neon in 1931, and Gustav Ludwig Hertz had improved on the method to almost completely separate neon by running it through a series of stages. In the United States, William D. Harkins had used it to separate chlorine. Kistiakowsky was familiar with the work of Charles G. Maier at the Bureau of Mines, who had also used the process to separate gases.

Uranium hexafluoride (UF_{6}) was the only known compound of uranium sufficiently volatile to be used in the gaseous diffusion process. Before this could be done, the Special Alloyed Materials (SAM) Laboratories at Columbia University and the Kellex Corporation had to overcome formidable difficulties to develop a suitable barrier. Fluorine consists of only a single natural isotope ^{19}F, so the 1 percent difference in molecular weights between ^{235}UF_{6} and ^{238}UF_{6} is solely the difference in weights of the uranium isotopes. For these reasons, UF_{6} was the only choice as a feedstock for the gaseous diffusion process. Uranium hexafluoride, a solid at room temperature, sublimes at 56.5 °C (133.7 °F) at 1 standard atmosphere (100 kPa). Applying Graham's law to uranium hexafluoride:

$${\mbox{Rate}_1 \over \mbox{Rate}_2}=\sqrt{M_2 \over M_1}=\sqrt{352 \over 349} \approx 1.0043$$

where:

Rate_{1} is the rate of effusion of ^{235}UF_{6}.
Rate_{2} is the rate of effusion of ^{238}UF_{6}.
M_{1} is the molar mass of ^{235}UF_{6} ≈ 235 + 6 × 19 = 349 g·mol^{−1}
M_{2} is the molar mass of ^{238}UF_{6} ≈ 238 + 6 × 19 = 352 g·mol^{−1}

Uranium hexafluoride is a highly corrosive substance. It is an oxidant and a Lewis acid which is able to bind to fluoride. It reacts with water to form a solid compound and is very difficult to handle on an industrial scale.

== Organization ==
Booth, Dunning and von Grosse investigated the gaseous diffusion process. In 1941, they were joined by Francis G. Slack from Vanderbilt University and Willard F. Libby from the University of California. In July 1941, an Office of Scientific Research and Development (OSRD) contract was awarded to Columbia University to study gaseous diffusion. With the help of the mathematician Karl P. Cohen, they built a twelve-stage pilot gaseous diffusion plant at the Pupin Laboratories. Initial tests showed that the stages were not as efficient as the theory would suggest; they would need about 4,600 stages to enrich to 90 percent uranium-235.

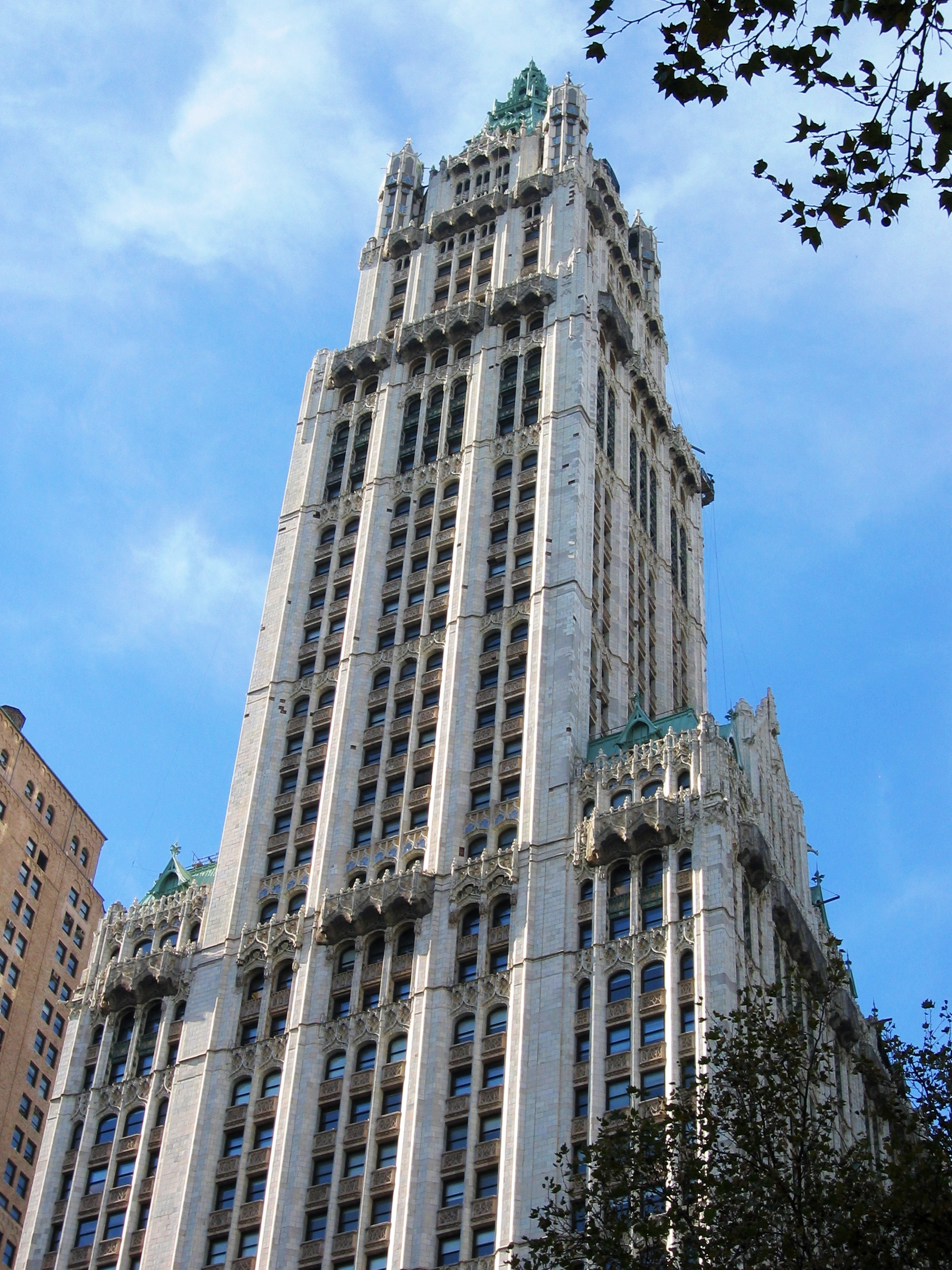
The Woolworth Building in Manhattan housed the offices of the Kellex Corporation and the Manhattan District's New York Area

A secret contract was awarded to M. W. Kellogg for engineering studies in July 1941. This included the design and construction of a ten-stage pilot gaseous diffusion plant. On 14 December 1942, the Manhattan District, the US Army component of the Manhattan Project (as the effort to develop an atomic bomb became known) contracted Kellogg to design, build and operate a full-scale production plant. Unusually, the contract did not require any guarantees from Kellogg that it could actually accomplish this task. Because the scope of the project was not well defined, Kellogg and the Manhattan District agreed to defer any financial details to a later, cost-plus contract, which was executed in April 1944. Kellogg was then paid $2.5 million.

For security reasons, the Army had Kellogg establish a wholly owned subsidiary, the Kellex Corporation, so the gaseous diffusion project could be kept separate from other company work. "Kell" stood for "Kellogg" and "X" for secret. Kellex operated as a self-contained and autonomous entity. Percival C. Keith, Kellogg's vice president of engineering, was placed in charge of Kellex. He drew extensively on Kellogg to staff the new company but also had to recruit staff from outside. Eventually, Kellex would have over 3,700 employees.

Dunning remained in charge at Columbia until 1 May 1943, when the Manhattan District took over the contract from OSRD. By this time Slack's group had nearly 50 members. His was the largest group, and it was working on the most challenging problem: the design of a suitable barrier through which the gas could diffuse. Another 30 scientists and technicians were working in five other groups. Henry A. Boorse was responsible for the pumps; Booth for the cascade test units. Libby handled chemistry, Nier analytical work and Hugh C. Paxton, engineering support. The Army reorganized the research effort at Columbia, which became the Special Alloyed Materials (SAM) Laboratories. Urey was put in charge, Dunning becoming head of one of its divisions. It would remain this way until 1 March 1945, when the SAM Laboratories were taken over by Union Carbide.

The expansion of the SAM Laboratories led to a search for more space. The Nash Garage Building at 3280 Broadway was purchased by Columbia University. Originally an automobile dealership, it was just a few blocks from the campus. Major Benjamin K. Hough Jr. was the Manhattan District's Columbia Area engineer, and he moved his offices there too. Kellex was in the Woolworth Building at 233 Broadway in Lower Manhattan. In January 1943, Lieutenant Colonel James C. Stowers was appointed New York Area Engineer, with responsibility for the entire K-25 Project. His small staff, initially of 20 military and civilian personnel but which gradually grew to over 70, was co-located in the Woolworth Building. The Manhattan District had its offices nearby at 270 Broadway until it moved to Oak Ridge, Tennessee, in August 1943.

== Codename ==
The codename "K-25" was a combination of the "K" from Kellex, and "25", a World War II-era code designation for uranium-235 (an isotope of element 92, mass number 235). The term was first used in Kellex internal reports for the end product, enriched uranium, in March 1943. By April 1943, the term "K-25 plant" was being used for the plant that created it. That month, the term "K-25 Project" was applied to the entire project to develop uranium enrichment using the gaseous diffusion process. When other "K-" buildings were added after the war, "K-25" became the name of the original, larger complex.

== Research and development ==
=== Diffusers ===
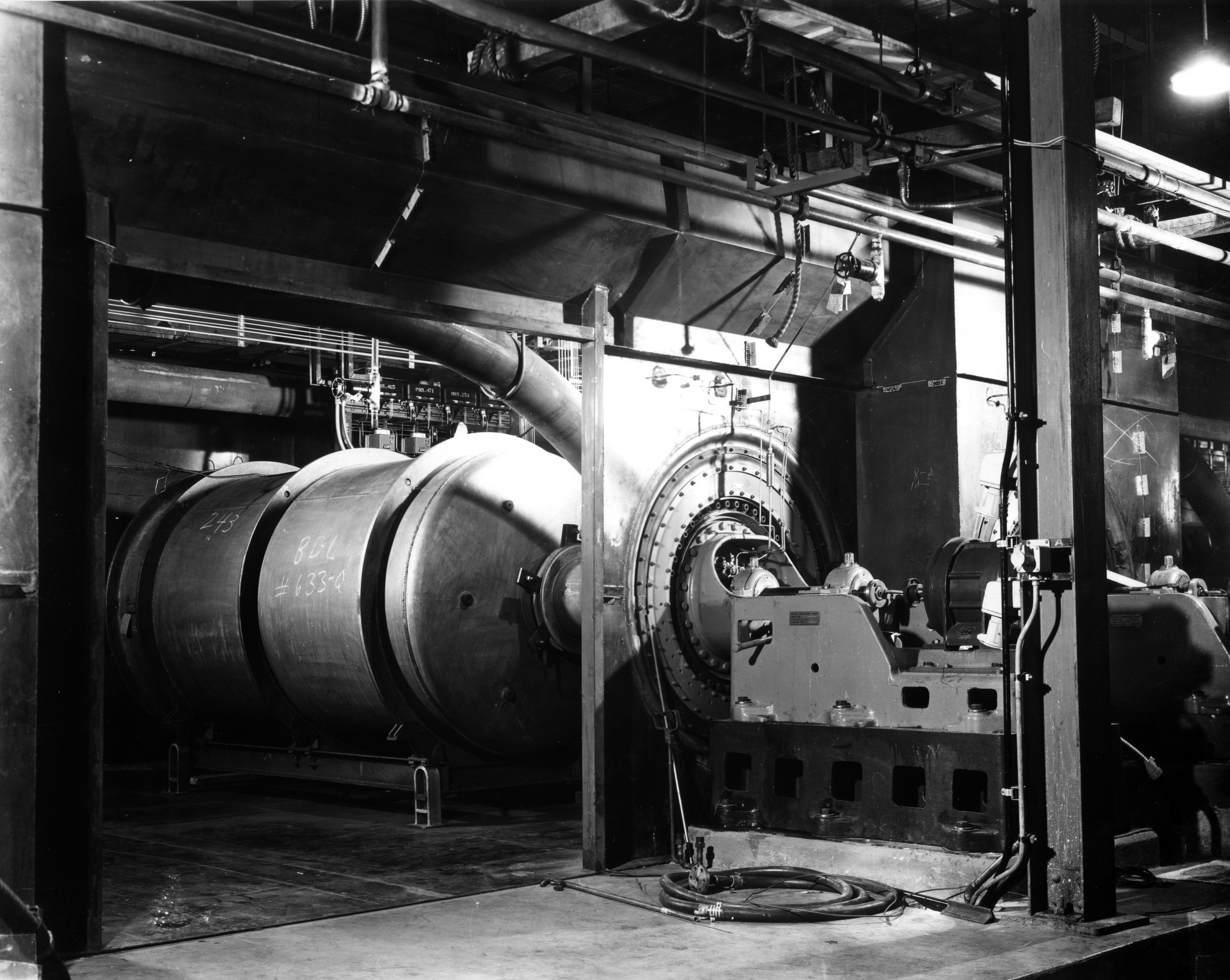
A gaseous diffusion cell, showing the diffuser

The highly corrosive nature of uranium hexafluoride presented several technological challenges. Pipes and fittings that it came into contact with had to be made of or clad with nickel. This was feasible for small objects but impractical for the large diffusers, the tank-like containers that had to hold the gas under pressure. Nickel was a vital war material, and although the Manhattan Project could use its overriding priority to acquire it, making the diffusers out of solid nickel would deplete the national supply. The director of the Manhattan Project, Brigadier General Leslie R. Groves Jr., gave the contract to build the diffusers to Chrysler. In turn Chrysler president K. T. Keller assigned Carl Heussner, an expert in electroplating, the task of developing a process for electroplating such a large object. Senior Chrysler executives called this "Project X-100".

Electroplating used one-thousandth of the amount of nickel needed for a solid nickel diffuser. The SAM Laboratories had already attempted this and failed. Heussner experimented with a prototype in a building built within a building, and found that it could be done, so long as the series of pickling and scaling steps required were done without anything coming in contact with oxygen. Chrysler's entire factory at Lynch Road in Detroit was turned over to the manufacture of diffusers. The electroplating process required over 50,000 square feet (4,600 m^{2}) of floor space, several thousand workers and a complicated air filtration system to ensure the nickel was not contaminated. By the war's end, Chrysler had built and shipped more than 3,500 diffusers.

=== Pumps ===
The gaseous diffusion process required suitable pumps that had to meet stringent requirements. Like the diffusers, the pumps had to resist corrosion from the uranium hexafluoride feed. Corrosion would not only damage the pumps, it would contaminate the feed. There could be no leakage of uranium hexafluoride (especially if it was already enriched) or of oil, which would react with the uranium hexafluoride. The pumps needed to operate at high rates and handle a gas 12 times as dense as air. To meet these requirements, the SAM Laboratories chose to use centrifugal pumps. The desired compression ratio of 2.3:1 to 3.2:1 was unusually high for this type of pump. For some purposes, a reciprocating pump would suffice, and these were designed by Boorse at the SAM Laboratories, while Ingersoll Rand tackled the centrifugal pumps.

In early 1943, Ingersoll Rand pulled out. Keith approached the Clark Compressor Company and Worthington Pump and Machinery, but they turned it down, saying it could not be done. So Keith and Groves met with executives at Allis-Chalmers, who agreed to build a new factory to produce the pumps, even though the pump design was still uncertain. The SAM Laboratories came up with a design, and Westinghouse built some prototypes that were successfully tested. Then Judson Swearingen at the Elliott Company came up with a revolutionary and promising design that was mechanically stable with seals that would contain the gas. This design was manufactured by Allis-Chalmers.

=== Barriers ===
Difficulties with the diffusers and pumps paled in significance beside those with the porous barrier. To work, the gaseous diffusion process required a barrier with microscopic holes, but not subject to plugging. It had to be porous but strong enough to handle the high pressures. And, like everything else, it had to resist corrosion from uranium hexafluoride. The latter criterion suggested a nickel barrier. Foster C. Nix at the Bell Telephone Laboratories experimented with nickel powder, while Edward O. Norris at the C. O. Jelliff Manufacturing Corporation and Edward Adler at the City College of New York worked on a design with electroplated nickel. Norris was an English interior decorator who had developed a very fine metal mesh for use with a spray gun. The design appeared too brittle and fragile for the proposed use, particularly on the higher stages of enrichment, but there was hope that this could be overcome.

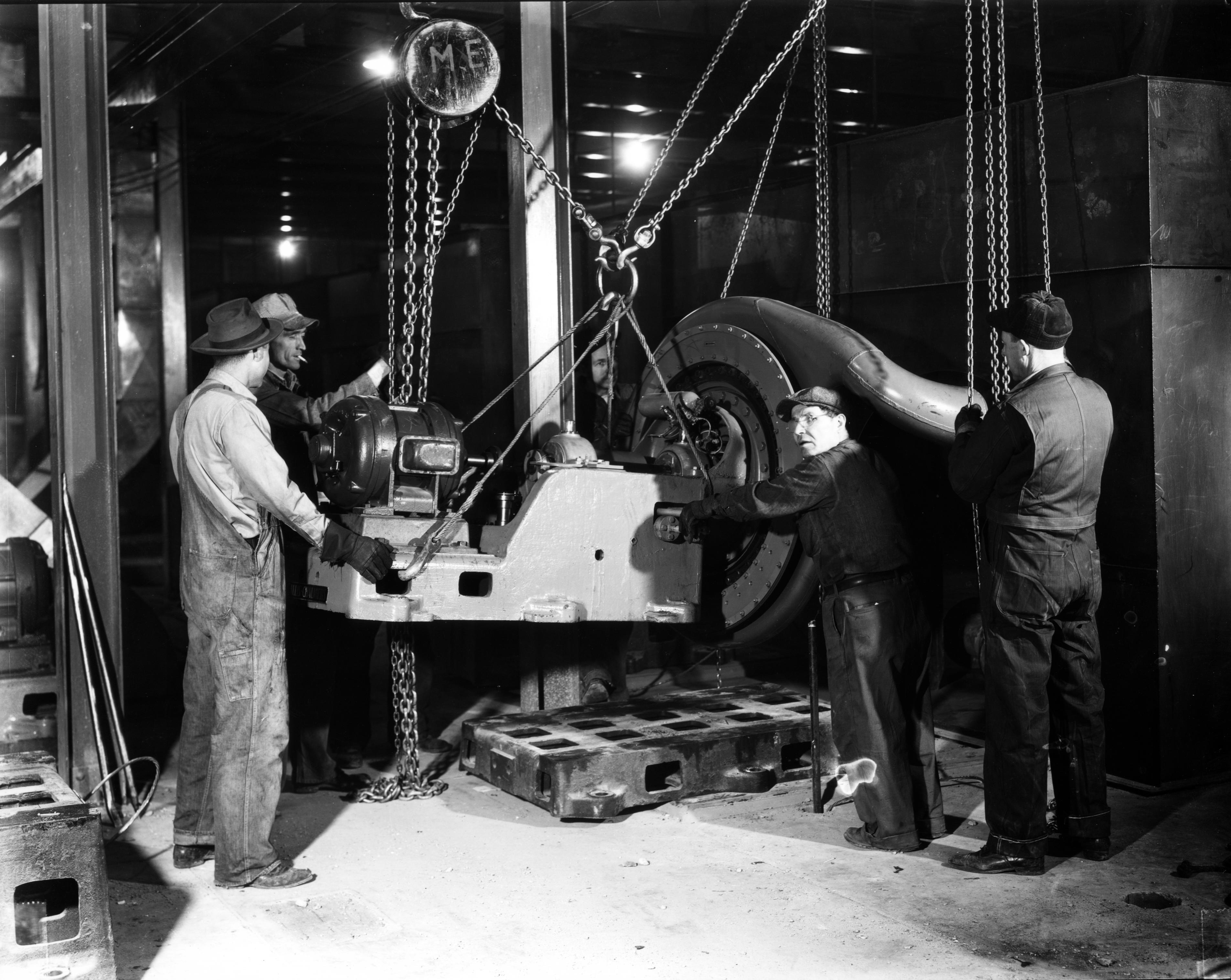
Setting up a process pump

In 1943, Urey brought in Hugh S. Taylor from Princeton University to look at the problem of a usable barrier. Libby made progress on understanding the chemistry of uranium hexafluoride, leading to ideas on how to prevent corrosion and plugging. Chemical researchers at the SAM Laboratories studied fluorocarbons, which resisted corrosion and could be used as lubricants and coolants in the gaseous diffusion plant. Despite this progress, the K-25 Project was in serious trouble without a suitable barrier, and by August 1943 it was facing cancellation. On 13 August Groves informed the Military Policy Committee (the senior committee that steered the Manhattan Project) that gaseous diffusion enrichment in excess of fifty percent was probably infeasible, and the gaseous diffusion plant would be limited to producing product with a lower enrichment which could be fed into the calutrons of the Y-12 electromagnetic plant. Urey therefore began preparations to mass-produce the Norris-Adler barrier, despite its problems.

Meanwhile, Union Carbide and Kellex had made researchers at the Bakelite Corporation, a subsidiary of Union Carbide, aware of Nix's unsuccessful efforts with powdered nickel barriers. To Frazier Groff and other researchers at Bakelite's laboratories in Bound Brook, New Jersey, it seemed that Nix was not taking advantage of the latest techniques, and they began their own development efforts. Both Bell and Bound Brook sent samples of their powdered nickel barriers to Taylor for evaluation, but he was unimpressed; neither had come up with a practical barrier. At Kellogg's laboratory in Jersey City, New Jersey, Clarence A. Johnson, who was aware of the steps taken by the SAM Laboratories to improve the Norris-Adler barrier, realized that they could also be taken with the Bakelite barrier. The result was a barrier better than either, although still short of what was required. At a meeting at Columbia with the Army in attendance on 20 October 1943, Keith proposed switching the development effort to the Johnson barrier. Urey balked at this, fearing this would destroy morale at the SAM Laboratories. The issue was put to Groves at a meeting on 3 November 1943, and he decided to pursue development of both the Johnson and the Norris-Adler barriers.

Groves summoned British help, in the form of Wallace Akers and fifteen members of the British gaseous diffusion project, who reviewed the progress made thus far. Their verdict was that while the new barrier was potentially superior, Keith's undertaking to build a new facility to produce the new barrier in just four months, produce all the barriers required in another four and have the production facility up and running in just twelve "would be something of a miraculous achievement". On 16 January 1944, Groves ruled in favor of the Johnson barrier. Johnson built a pilot plant for the new process at the Nash Building. Taylor analyzed the sample barriers produced and pronounced only 5 percent of them to be of acceptable quality. Edward Mack Jr. created his own pilot plant at Schermerhorn Hall at Columbia, and Groves obtained 80 short tons (73 t) of nickel from the International Nickel Company. With plenty of nickel to work with, by April 1944 both pilot plants were producing barriers of acceptable quality at a 45 percent rate.

== Construction ==
The project site chosen was at the Clinton Engineer Works in Tennessee. The area was inspected by representatives of the Manhattan District, Kellex and Union Carbide on 18 January 1943. Consideration was also given to sites near the Shasta Dam in California and the Big Bend of the Columbia River in Washington state. The lower humidity of these areas made them more suitable for a gaseous diffusion plant, but the Clinton Engineer Works site was immediately available and otherwise suitable. Groves decided on the site in April 1943.

Under the contract, Kellex had responsibility not just for the design and engineering of the K-25 plant, but for its construction as well. The prime construction contractor was J. A. Jones Construction from Charlotte, North Carolina. It had impressed Groves with its work on several major Army construction projects, such as Camp Shelby, Mississippi. There were more than sixty subcontractors. Kellex engaged another construction company, Ford, Bacon & Davis, to build the fluorine and nitrogen facilities, and the conditioning plant. Construction work was initially the responsibility of Lieutenant Colonel Warren George, the chief of the construction division of the Clinton Engineer Works. Major W. P. Cornelius became the construction officer responsible for K-25 works on 31 July 1943. He was answerable to Stowers back in Manhattan. He became chief of the construction division on 1 March 1946. J. J. Allison was the resident engineer from Kellex, and Edwin L. Jones, the General Manager of J. A. Jones.

=== Power plant ===
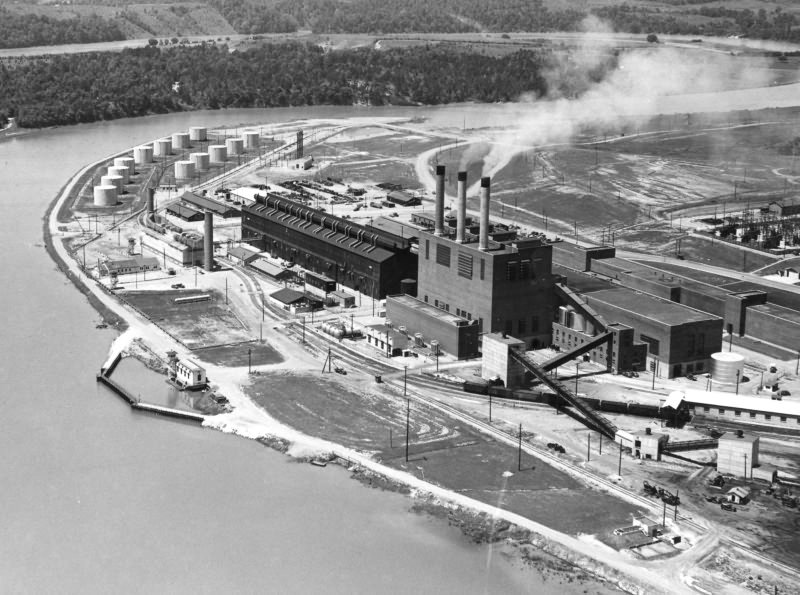
K-25 power plant (the building with three smoke stacks) in 1945. The dark building behind it is the S-50 thermal diffusion plant.

Construction began before completion of the design for the gaseous diffusion process. Because of the large amount of electric power the K-25 plant was expected to consume, it was decided to provide it with its own electric power plant. While the Tennessee Valley Authority (TVA) believed it could supply the Clinton Engineer Works' needs, there was unease about relying on a single supplier when a power failure could cost the gaseous diffusion plant weeks of work, and the lines to TVA could be sabotaged. A local plant was more secure. The Kellex engineers were also attracted to the idea of being able to generate the variable frequency current required by the gaseous diffusion process without complicated transformers.

A site was chosen for this on the western edge of the Clinton Engineer Works site where it could draw cold water from the Clinch River and discharge warm water into Poplar Creek without affecting the inflow. Groves approved this location on 3 May 1943. Surveying began on the power plant site on 31 May, and J. A. Jones started construction work the following day. Because the bedrock was 35 to 40 feet (11 to 12 m) below the surface, the power plant was supported on 40 concrete-filled caissons. Installation of the first boiler commenced in October 1943. Construction work was complete by late September. To prevent sabotage, the power plant was connected to the gaseous diffusion plant by an underground conduit. Despite this, there was one act of sabotage, in which a nail was driven through the electric cable. The culprit was never found but was considered more likely to be a disgruntled employee than an Axis spy.

Electric power in the United States was generated at 60 hertz; the power house was able to generate variable frequencies between 45 and 60 hertz, and constant frequencies of 60 and 120 hertz. This capability was not ultimately required, and all but one of the K-25 systems ran on a constant 60 hertz, the exception using a constant 120 hertz. The first coal-fired boiler was started on 7 April 1944, followed by the second on 14 July and the third on 2 November. Each produced 750,000 pounds (340,000 kg) of steam per hour 1,325 pounds per square inch (9,140 kPa) and 935 °F (502 °C). To obtain the fourteen turbine generators needed, Groves had to use the Manhattan Project's priority to overrule Julius Albert Krug, the director of the Office of War Utilities. The turbine generators had a combined output of 238,000 kilowatts. The power plant could also receive power from TVA. It was decommissioned in the 1960s and demolished in 1995.

=== Gaseous diffusion plant ===
A site for the K-25 facility was chosen near the high school of the town of Wheat. As the dimensions of the K-25 facility became more apparent, it was decided to move it to a larger site near Poplar Creek, closer to the power plant. This site was approved on 24 June 1943. Considerable work was required to prepare the site. Existing roads in the area were improved to take heavy traffic. A 5.1-mile (8.2 km) road was built to connect the site to US Route 70, and another, 5 miles (8.0 km) long, to connect with Tennessee State Route 61. A ferry over the Clinch River was upgraded and then replaced with a 360-foot (110 m) long bridge in December 1943. A 10.7-mile (17.2 km) railroad spur was run from Blair, Tennessee, to the K-25 site. Some 12.9 miles (20.8 km) of sidings were also provided. The first carload of freight traversed the line on 18 September 1943.

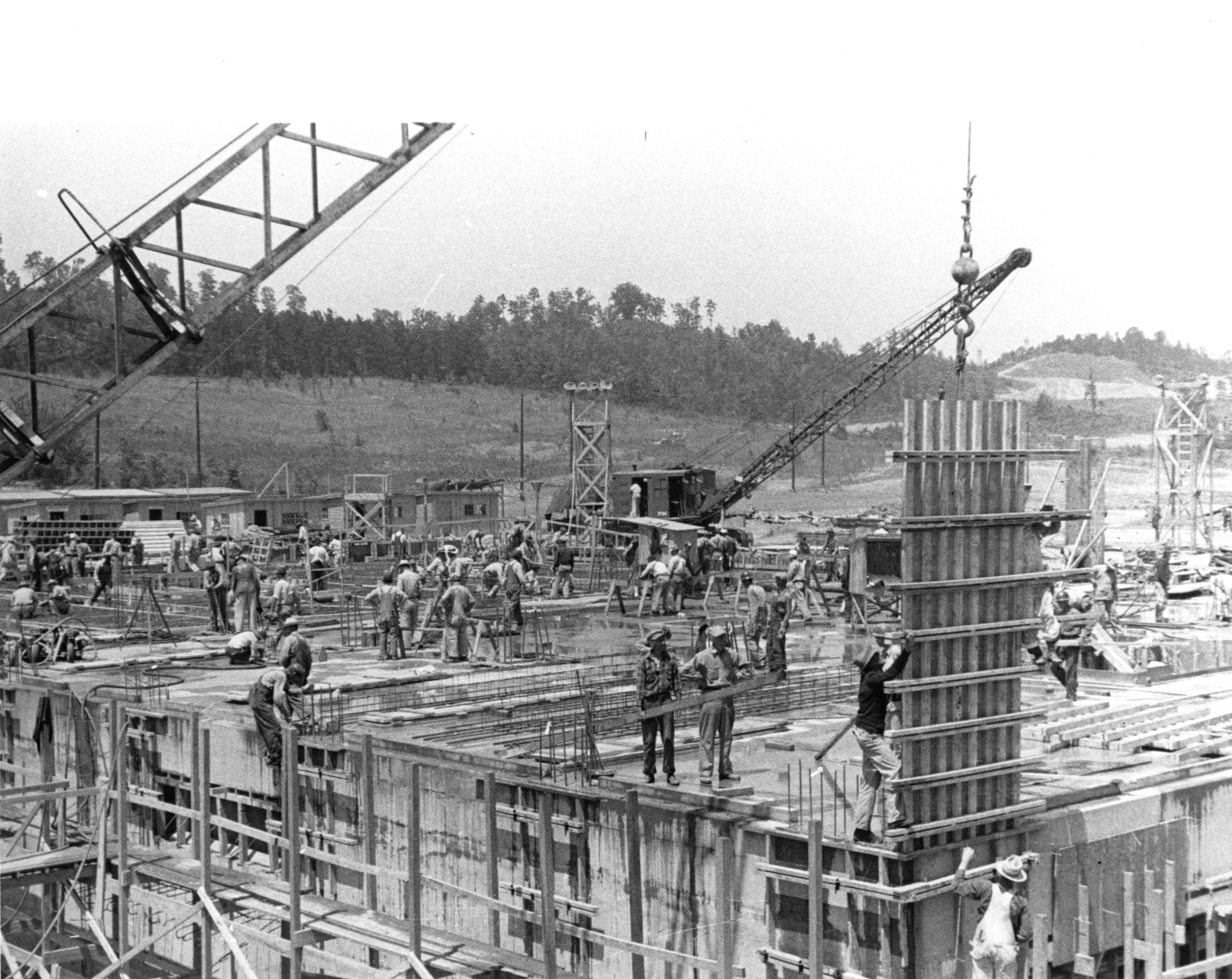
K-25 under construction

It was initially intended that the construction workers should live off-site, but the poor condition of the roads and a shortage of accommodations in the area made commuting long and difficult, which in turn made it difficult to find and retain workers. Thus construction workers were housed in large hutment and trailer camps. The J. A. Jones camp for K-25 workers, known as Happy Valley, held 15,000 people. This required 8 dormitories, 17 barracks, 1,590 hutments, 1,153 trailers and 100 Victory Houses. A pumping station was built to supply drinking water from the Clinch River, along with a water treatment plant. Amenities included a school, eight cafeterias, a bakery, theater, three recreation halls, a warehouse and a cold storage plant. Ford, Bacon & Davis established a smaller camp for 2,100 people. Responsibility for the camps was transferred to the Roane-Anderson Company on 25 January 1946, and the school was transferred to district control in March 1946.

Work began on the 130-acre (53 ha) main facility area on 20 October 1943. Although the site was generally flat, some 3,500,000 cubic yards (2,700,000 m^{3}) of soil and rock had to be excavated from areas up to 46 feet (14 m) high, and six major areas had to be filled, to a maximum depth of 23.5 feet (7.2 m). Normally buildings containing complicated heavy machinery would rest on concrete caissons down to the bedrock, but this would have required thousands of caissons. To save time, soil compaction and shallow footings were used instead. Layers were laid down and compacted with sheepsfoot rollers in the areas that had to be filled, and the footings were laid over compacted soil in the low-lying areas and the undisturbed soil in the areas that had been excavated. Activities overlapped, so concrete pouring began while grading was still going on. Cranes started lifting the steel frames into place on 19 January 1944.

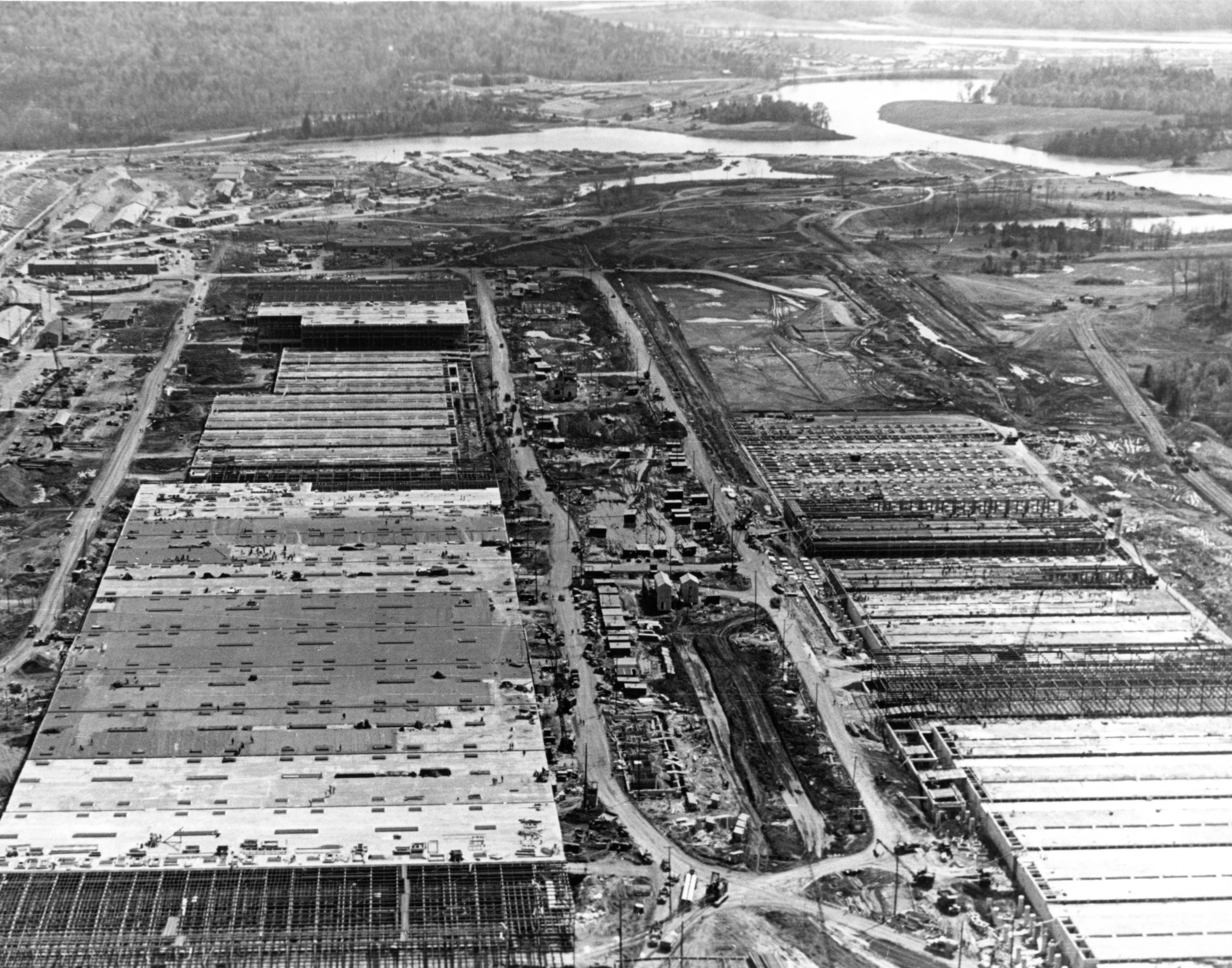
K-25 under construction

Kellex's design for the main process building of K-25 called for a four-story U-shaped structure 0.5 miles (0.80 km) long containing 51 main process buildings and three purge cascade buildings. These were divided into nine sections. Within these were cells of six stages. The cells could be operated independently or consecutively within a section. Similarly, the sections could be operated separately or as part of a single cascade. When completed, there were 2,892 stages. The basement housed the auxiliary equipment, such as the transformers, switch gears, and air conditioning systems. The ground floor contained the cells. The third level contained the piping. The fourth floor was the operating floor, which contained the control room and the hundreds of instrument panels. From here, the operators monitored the process. The first section was ready for test runs on 17 April 1944, although the barriers were not yet ready to be installed.

The main process building surpassed The Pentagon as the largest building in the world, with a floor area of 5,264,000 square feet (489,000 m^{2}), and an enclosed volume of 97,500,000 cubic feet (2,760,000 m^{3}). Construction required 200,000 cubic yards (150,000 m^{3}) of concrete and 100 miles (160 km) of gas pipes. Because uranium hexafluoride corrodes steel and steel piping had to be coated in nickel, smaller pipes were made of copper or monel. The equipment operated under vacuum pressures, so plumbing had to be air tight. Special efforts were made to create as clean an environment as possible to areas where piping or fixtures were being installed. J. A. Jones established a special cleanliness unit on 18 April 1944. Buildings were completely sealed off, air was filtered, and all cleaning was with vacuum cleaners and mopping. Workers wore white lint-free gloves. At the peak of construction activity in May 1945, 25,266 people were employed on the site.

=== Other buildings ===
Although by far the largest, the main process building (K-300) was but one of many that made up the facility. There was a conditioning building (K-1401), where piping and equipment were cleaned prior to installation. A feed purification building (K-101) was built to remove impurities from the uranium hexafluoride, but never operated as such because the suppliers provided feed pure enough to be fed into the gaseous diffusion process. The three-story surge and waste removal building (K-601) processed the "tail" stream of depleted uranium hexafluoride. The air conditioning building (K-1401) provided 76,500 cubic feet (2,170 m^{3}) per minute of clean, dry air. K-1201 compressed the air. The nitrogen plant (K-1408) provided gas for use as a pump sealant and to protect equipment from moist air.

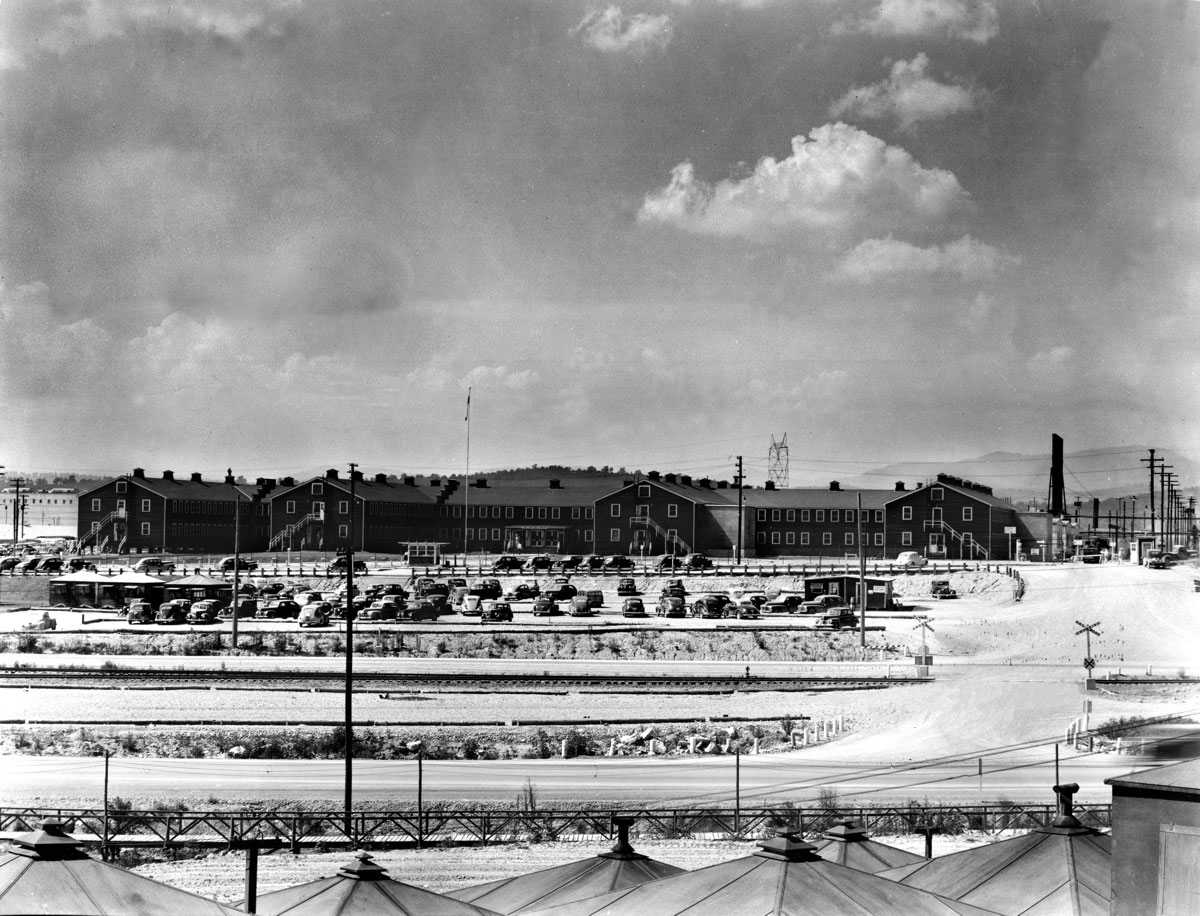
The K-1001 administration building provided 2 acres (0.81 ha) of office space

The fluorine generating plant (K-1300) generated, bottled and stored fluorine. It had not been in great demand before the war, and Kellex and the Manhattan District considered four different processes for large-scale production. A process developed by the Hooker Chemical Company was chosen. Owing to the hazardous nature of fluorine, it was decided that shipping it across the United States was inadvisable and it should be manufactured on site at the Clinton Engineer Works. Two pump houses (K-801 and K-802) and two cooling towers (H-801 and H-802) provided 135,000,000 US gallons (510 ML) of cooling water per day for the motors and compressors.

The administration building (K-1001) provided 2 acres (0.81 ha) of office space. A laboratory building (K-1401) contained facilities for testing and analyzing feed and product. Five drum warehouses (K-1025-A to -E) had 4,300 square feet (400 m^{2}) of floor space to store drums of uranium hexafluoride. There were also warehouses for general stores (K-1035), spare parts (K-1036), and equipment (K-1037). A cafeteria (K-1002) provided meal facilities, including a segregated lunch room for African Americans. There were three changing houses (K-1008-A, B and C), a dispensary (K-1003), an instrument repair building (K-1024), and a fire station (K-1021).

In mid-January 1945, Kellex proposed an extension to K-25 to allow product enrichment of up to 85 percent. Groves initially approved this but later canceled it in favor of a 540-stage side feed unit, which became known as K-27, which could process a slightly enriched product. This could then be fed into K-25 or the calutrons at Y-12. Kellex estimated that using the enriched feed from K-27 could lift the output from K-25 from 35 to 60 percent uranium-235. Construction started at K-27 on 3 April 1945 and was completed in December 1945. The five drum warehouses were moved by truck to make way for K-27. The construction work was expedited by making it "virtually a Chinese copy" of a section of K-25. By 31 December 1946, when the Manhattan Project ended, 110,048,961 man-hours of construction work had been performed at the K-25 site. The total cost, including that of K-27, was $479,589,999 (equivalent to $6.61 billion in 2024).

The water tower (K-1206-F) was a 382-foot (116 m) tall structure that held 400,000 US gallons (1,500,000 L) of water. It was built in 1958 by the Chicago Bridge and Iron Company and served as reservoir for the fire suppression system. Over 1.5 million pounds (680 tonnes) of steel was used in its construction. It operated until June 2013 and was demolished in August 2013.

== Operations ==
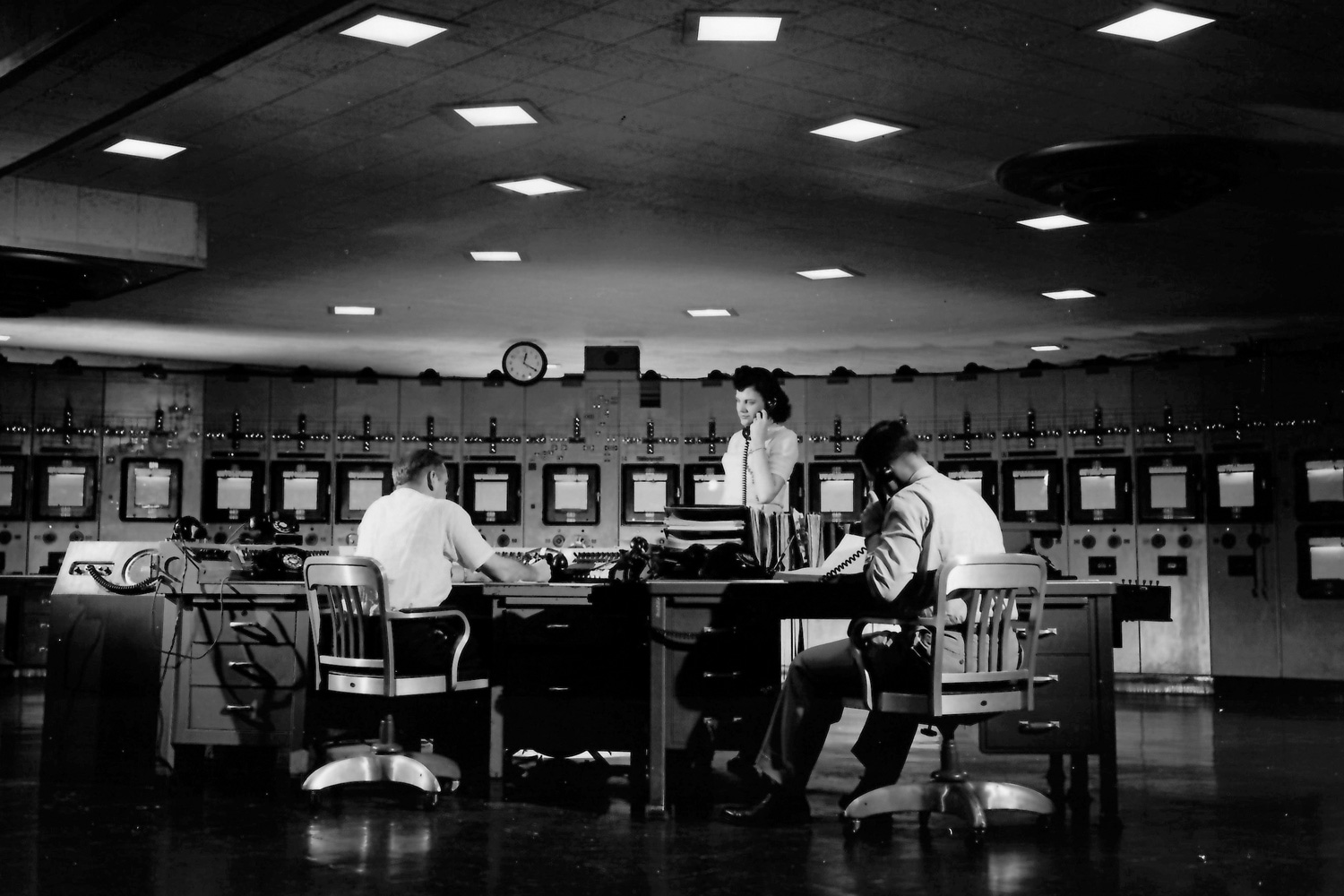
The K-25 control room

The preliminary specification for the K-25 plant in March 1943 called for it to produce 1 kilogram (2.2 lb) per day of product that was 90 percent uranium-235. As the practical difficulties were realized, this target was reduced to 36 percent. On the other hand, the cascade design meant construction did not need to be complete before the plant started operating. In August 1943, Kellex submitted a schedule that called for a capability to produce material enriched to 5 percent uranium-235 by 1 June 1945; 15 percent by 1 July; and 36 percent by 23 August. This schedule was revised in August 1944 to 0.9 percent by 1 January 1945; 5 percent by 10 June; 15 percent by 1 August; 23 percent by 13 September; and 36 percent as soon as possible after that.

A meeting between the Manhattan District and Kellogg on 12 December 1942 recommended the K-25 plant be operated by Union Carbide. This would be through a wholly owned subsidiary, Carbon and Carbide Chemicals. A cost-plus-fixed-fee contract was signed on 18 January 1943, setting the fee at $75,000 per month. This was later increased to $96,000 per month to operate both K-25 and K-27. Union Carbide did not wish to be the sole operator of the facility; Union Carbide suggested the conditioning plant be built and operated by Ford, Bacon & Davis. The Manhattan District found this acceptable, and a cost-plus-fixed-fee contract was negotiated with a fee of $216,000 for services up to the end of June 1945. The contract was terminated early on 1 May 1945, when Union Carbide took over the plant. Ford, Bacon & Davis was therefore paid $202,000. The other exception was the fluorine plant. Hooker Chemical was asked to supervise its construction of the fluorine plant and initially to operate it for a fixed fee of $24,500. The plant was turned over to Union Carbide on 1 February 1945.

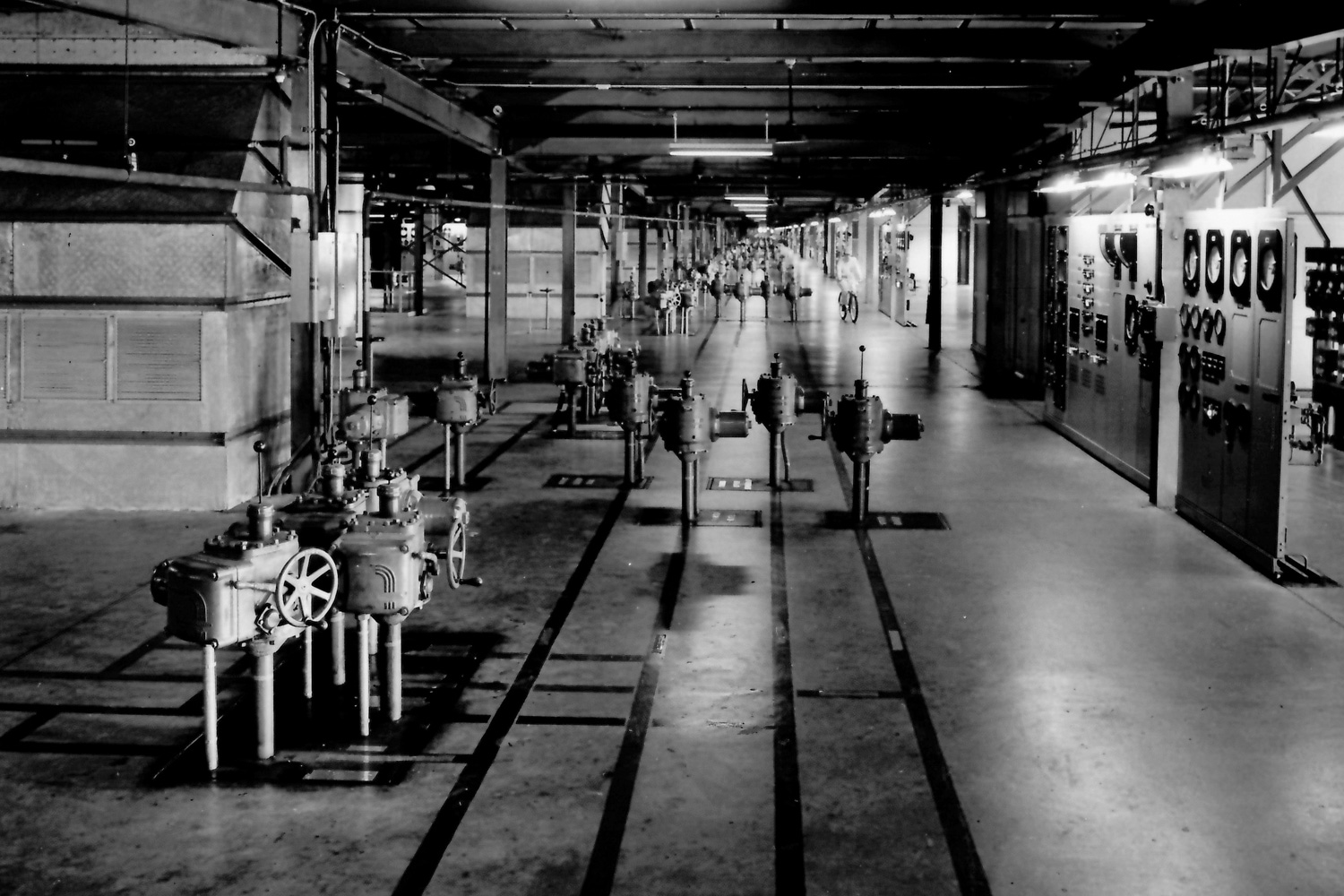
A worker on a bicycle in the K-25 operating level

Part of the K-300 complex was taken over by Union Carbide in August 1944 and was run as a pilot plant, training operators and developing procedures, using nitrogen instead of uranium hexafluoride until October 1944, and then perfluoroheptane until April 1945. The design of the gaseous diffusion plant allowed for it to be completed in sections and for the sections to be put into operation while work continued on the others. J. A. Jones completed the first 60 stages by the end of 1944. Before each stage was accepted, it underwent tests by J. A. Jones, Carbide and Carbon, and SAM Laboratories technicians to verify that the equipment was working and there were no leaks. Between four and six hundred people devoted eight months to this testing. Perfluoroheptane was used as a test fluid until February 1945, when it was decided to use uranium hexafluoride despite its corrosive nature.

Manhattan District engineer Colonel Kenneth Nichols placed Major John J. Moran in charge of production at K-25. Production commenced in February 1945, and the first product was shipped to the calutrons in March. By April, the gaseous diffusion plant was producing 1.1 percent product. It was then decided that instead of processing uranium hexafluoride feed from the Harshaw Chemical Company, the gaseous diffusion plant would take the product of the S-50 thermal diffusion plant, with an average enrichment of about 0.85 percent. Product enrichment continued to improve as more stages came online and performed better than anticipated. By June product was being enriched to 7 percent; by September it was 23 percent. The S-50 plant ceased operation on 9 September, and Kellex transferred the last unit to Union Carbide on 11 September. Highly enriched uranium was used in the Little Boy atomic bomb used in the bombing of Hiroshima on 6 August.

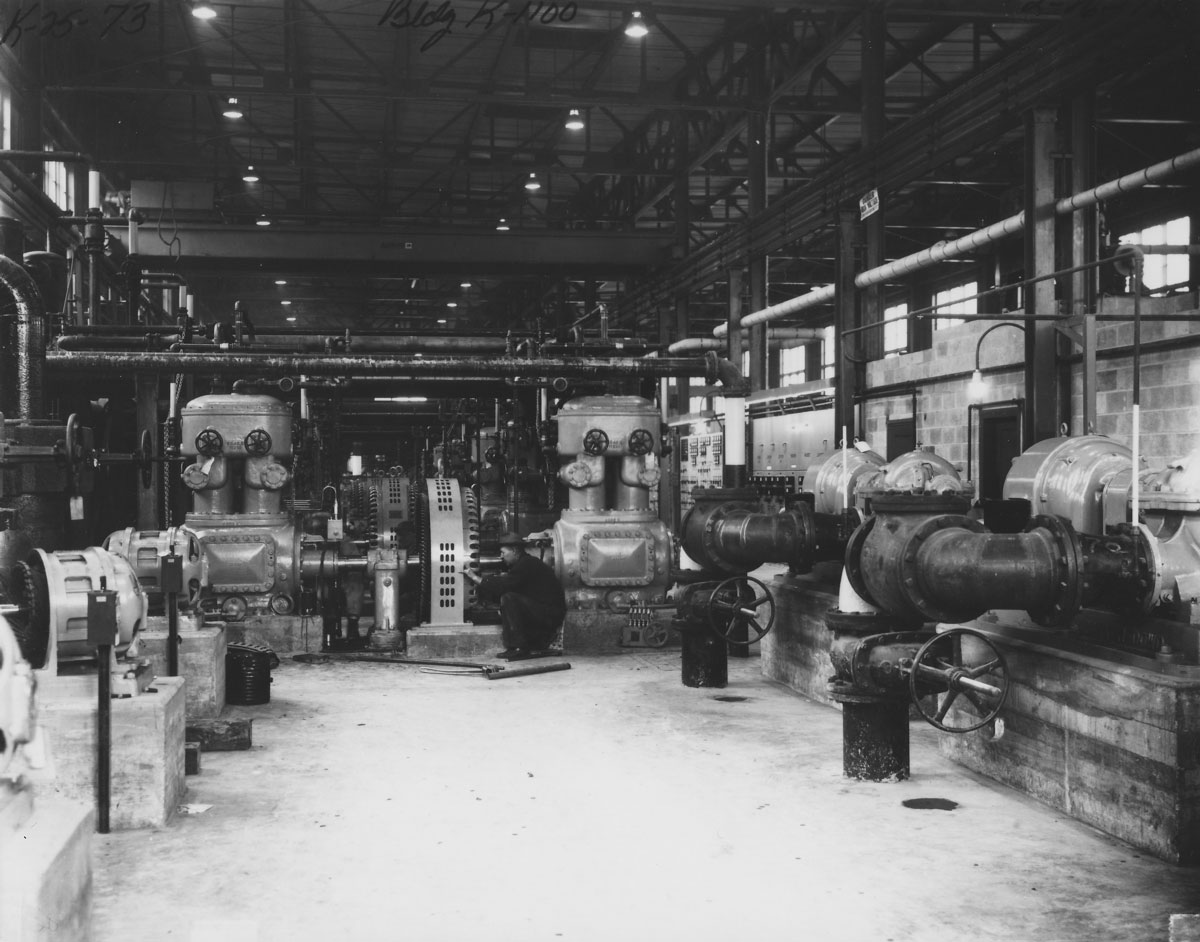
Air compressors and water pumps in the K-1101 air conditioning building

With the end of the war in August 1945, the Manhattan Project's priority shifted from speed to economy and efficiency. The cascades were configurable, so they could produce a large amount of slightly enriched product by running them in parallel, or a small amount of highly enriched product through running them in series. By early 1946, with K-27 in operation, the facility was producing 3.6 kilograms (7.9 lb) per day, enriched to 30 percent. The next step was to increase the enrichment further to 60 percent. This was achieved on 20 July 1946. This presented a problem, because Y-12 was not equipped to handle feed that was so highly enriched, but the Los Alamos Laboratory required 95 percent. For a time, product was mixed with feed to reduce the enrichment to 30 percent. Taking the concentration up to 95 percent raised safety concerns, as there was the risk of a criticality accident.

After some deliberation, with opinions sought and obtained from Percival Keith, Norris Bradbury, Darol Froman, Elmer E. Kirkpatrick, Kenneth Nichols and Edward Teller, it was decided that this could be done safely if appropriate precautions were taken. On 28 November 1946, the K-25 plant began producing 94 percent product. At this point, they ran into a serious flaw in the gaseous diffusion concept: enrichment in uranium-235 also enriched the product in the unwanted and fairly useless uranium-234, making it difficult to raise the enrichment to 95 percent. On 6 December 1946, production was dropped back to a steady 2.56 kilograms (5.6 lb) per day enriched to 93.7 percent uranium-235, along with 1.9 percent uranium-234. This was regarded as a satisfactory product by the Los Alamos Laboratory, so on 26 December 1946 enrichment activity at Y-12 was curtailed. The Manhattan Project ended a few days later. Responsibility for the K-25 facility then passed to the newly established Atomic Energy Commission on 1 January 1947. Workers at the plant were represented by the Oil, Chemical and Atomic Workers International Union.

== Closure and demolition ==
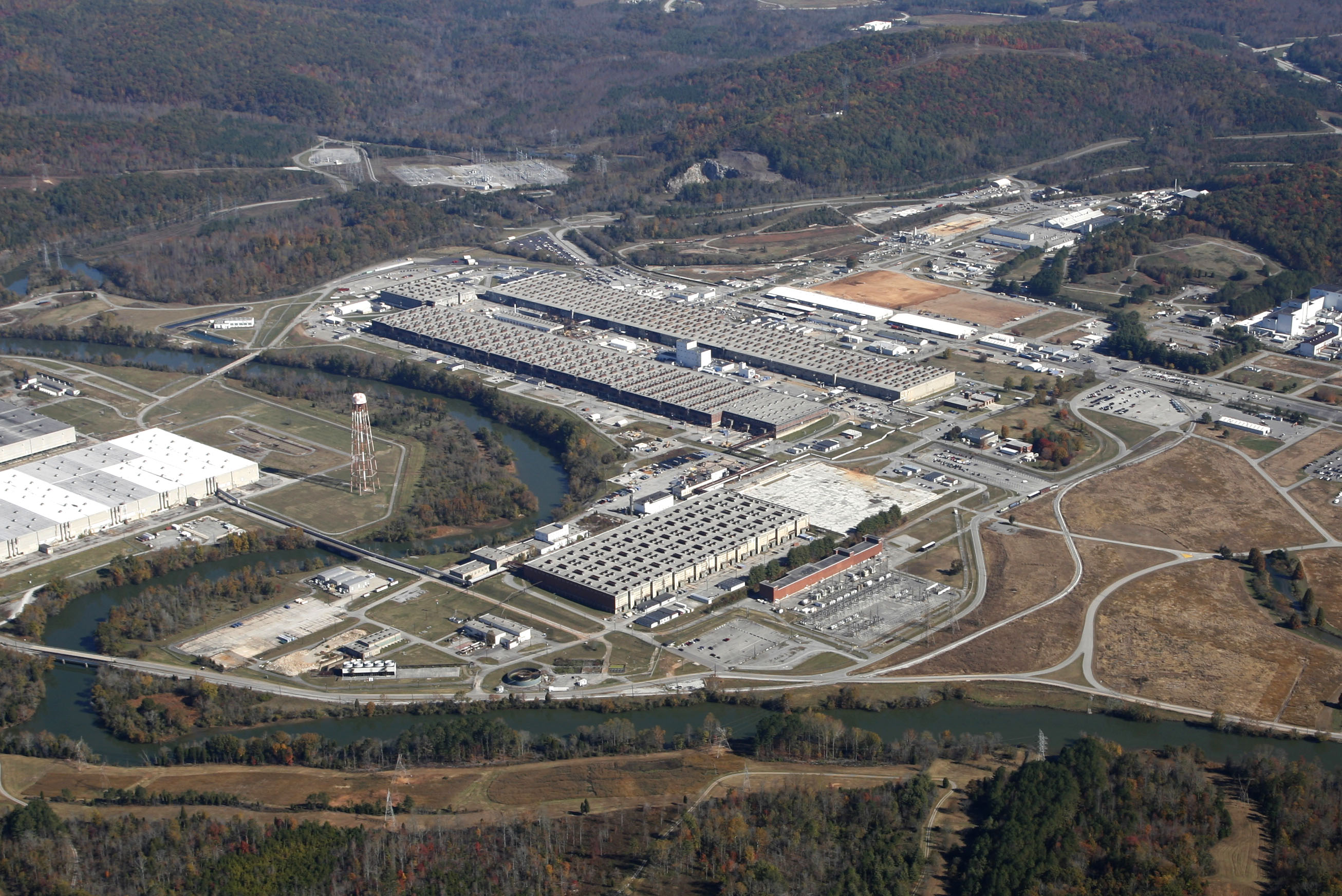
The K-25 complex in 2006

K-25 became a prototype for other gaseous diffusion facilities established in the early post-war years. The first of these was the 374,000-square-foot (34,700 m^{2}) K-27 completed in September 1945. It was followed by the 15-acre (6.1 ha) K-29 in 1951, the 20-acre (8.1 ha) K-31 in 1951 and the 32-acre (13 ha) K-33 in 1954. Gaseous diffusion facilities were built at Paducah, Kentucky, in 1952, and Portsmouth, Ohio, in 1954. The K-25 plant was renamed the Oak Ridge Gaseous Diffusion Plant in 1955.

Today, uranium isotope separation is usually done by the more energy-efficient ultra centrifuge process, developed in the Soviet Union after World War II by Soviet and captured German engineers working in detention. The centrifuge process was the first isotope separation method considered for the Manhattan Project but was abandoned due to technical challenges early in the project. When German scientists and engineers were released from Soviet captivity in the mid-1950s, the West became aware of the ultra centrifuge design and began shifting uranium enrichment to this much more efficient process. As centrifuge technology advanced, it became possible to carry out uranium enrichment on a smaller scale without the vast resources that were necessary to build and operate 1940s and 1950s "K" and "Y" style separation plants, a development which had the effect of increasing nuclear proliferation concerns.

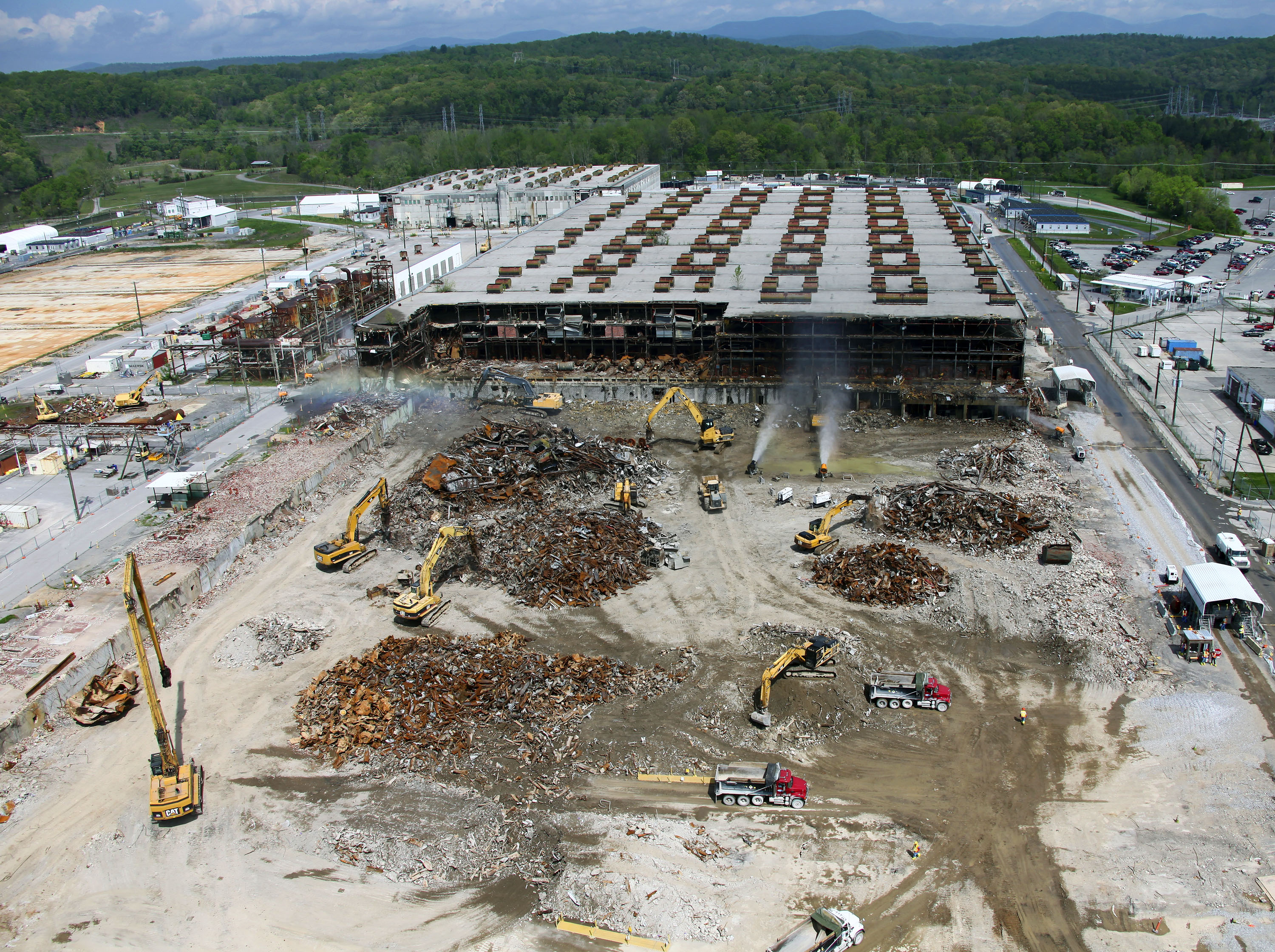
Demolition of K-25 in progress in April 2012

Centrifuge cascades began operating at Oak Ridge in 1961. A gas centrifuge test facility (K-1210) opened in 1975, followed by a larger centrifuge plant demonstration facility (K-1220) in 1982. In response to an order from President Lyndon B. Johnson to cut production of enriched uranium by 25 percent, K-25 and K-27 ceased production in 1964, but in 1969 K-25 began producing uranium enriched to 3 to 5 percent for use in nuclear reactors. Martin Marietta Energy replaced Union Carbide as the operator in 1984. Gaseous diffusion ceased on 27 August 1985. The Oak Ridge Gaseous Diffusion Plant was renamed the Oak Ridge K-25 Site in 1989 and the East Tennessee Technology Park in 1996. Production of enriched uranium using gaseous diffusion ceased in Portsmouth in 2001 and at Paducah in 2013. Presently all commercial uranium enrichment in the United States is carried out using gas centrifuge technology.

The United States Department of Energy contracted with British Nuclear Fuels Ltd in 1997 to decontaminate and decommission the facilities. Its subsidiary Reactor Sites Management Company Limited was acquired by EnergySolutions in June 2007. Initially K-29, K-31 and K-33 were to be retained for other uses, but it was subsequently decided to demolish them. Bechtel Jacobs, the environmental management contractor, assumed responsibility for the facility in July 2005. Demolition of K-29 began in January 2006 and was completed in August. Demolition of K-33 began in January 2011 and was completed ahead of schedule in September. It was followed by the demolition of K-31, which began in October 2014 and was completed in June 2015.

Demolition of the K-1206-F Water Tower
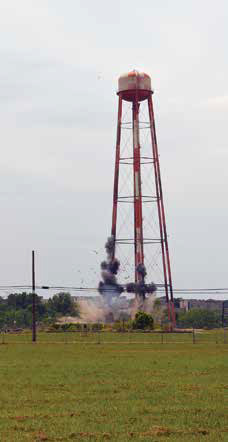

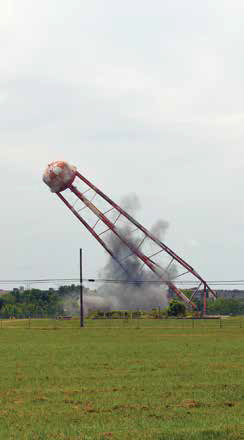

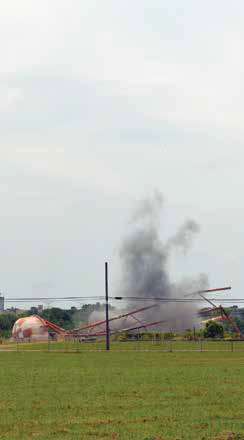

Bechtel Jacobs was contracted to dismantle and demolish the K-25 facility in September 2008. The contract, valued at $1.48 billion, was made retrospective to October 2007 and ended in August 2011. Demolition work was then carried out by URS | CH2M Hill Oak Ridge. Demolition was completed in March 2014 Demolition of K-27, the last of the five gaseous diffusion facilities at Oak Ridge, began in February 2016. US Senator Lamar Alexander and US Congressman Chuck Fleischmann joined 1,500 workers to watch the final wall come down on 30 August 2016. Its demolition was completed in February 2017. Since 2020, the K-25 site is being redeveloped in part into a general aviation airport to service the city of Oak Ridge. Several small private nuclear facilities are also planned on the site.

== Commemoration ==
On 27 February 2020, the K-25 History Center, a 7,500-square foot museum opened at the site. The museum is a branch of the American Museum of Science and Energy and features hundreds of original artifacts and interactive exhibits related to the K-25 site.
