= Judson S. Swearingen =

Dr. Judson S. Swearingen (January 11, 1907 – September 5, 1999) was a theoretician, hands-on manager, inventor and entrepreneur. He made major contributions to the technology of cryogenic expanders, compressors, and to the design of shaft seals for high-speed machinery.

He received his Ph.D. from the University of Texas (UT) in 1933. Prior to joining the UT faculty in 1939 he was an entrepreneur and co-owned a small cracking plant and a natural gasoline plant.

In December 1942, Swearingen invented the leak proof seal essential to the successful operation of the K-25 Gaseous Diffusion Plant in Oak Ridge, TN.

Swearingen was a member of the National Academy of Engineering beginning in 1977.
