= S-50 (Manhattan Project) =

Manhattan Project uranium enrichment facility

Coordinates: 35°54′58″N 84°24′43″W

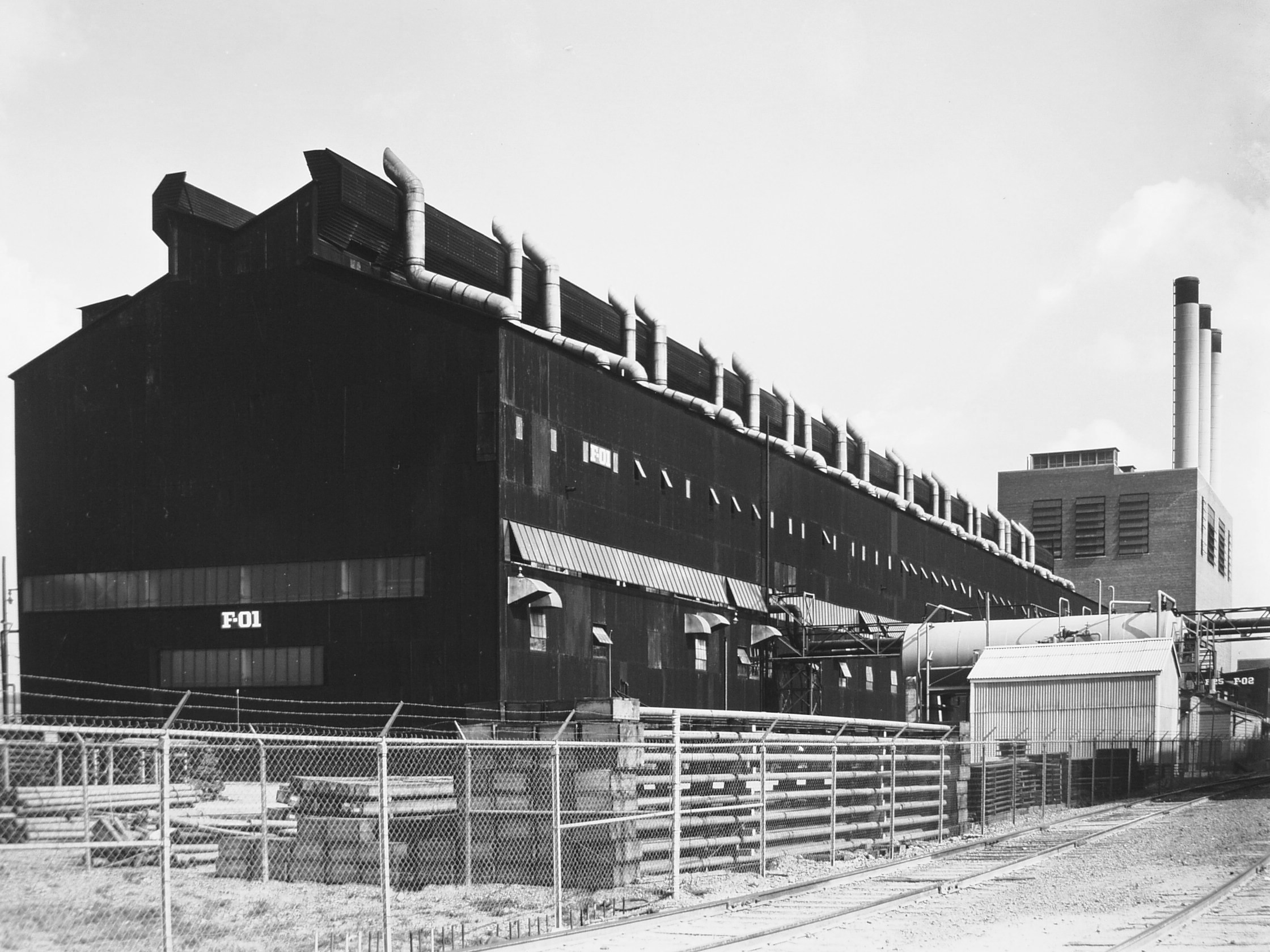
Thermal Diffusion Process Building at S-50. The building in the background with the smokestacks is the K-25 powerhouse.

The S-50 Project was the Manhattan Project's effort to produce enriched uranium by liquid thermal diffusion during World War II. It was one of three technologies for uranium enrichment pursued by the Manhattan Project.

The liquid thermal diffusion process was not one of the enrichment technologies initially selected for use in the Manhattan Project, and was developed independently by Philip H. Abelson and other scientists at the United States Naval Research Laboratory. This was primarily due to doubts about the process's technical feasibility, but inter-service rivalry between the United States Army and United States Navy also played a part.

Pilot plants were built at the Anacostia Naval Air Station and the Philadelphia Navy Yard, and a production facility at the Clinton Engineer Works in Oak Ridge, Tennessee. This was the only production-scale liquid thermal diffusion plant ever built. It could not enrich uranium sufficiently for use in an atomic bomb, but it could provide slightly enriched feed for the Y-12 calutrons and the K-25 gaseous diffusion plants. It was estimated that the S-50 plant had sped up production of enriched uranium used in the Little Boy bomb employed in the atomic bombing of Hiroshima by a week.

The S-50 plant ceased production in September 1945, but it was reopened in May 1946, and used by the United States Army Air Forces Nuclear Energy for the Propulsion of Aircraft (NEPA) project. The plant was demolished in the late 1940s.

== Background ==
The discovery of the neutron by James Chadwick in 1932, followed by that of nuclear fission in uranium by the German chemists Otto Hahn and Fritz Strassmann in 1938, and its theoretical explanation (and naming) by Lise Meitner and Otto Robert Frisch soon after, opened up the possibility of a nuclear chain reaction with uranium. Fears that a German atomic bomb project would develop nuclear weapons, especially among scientists who were refugees from Nazi Germany and other fascist countries, were expressed in the Einstein–Szilard letter. This prompted preliminary research in the United States in late 1939.

Niels Bohr and John Archibald Wheeler applied the liquid-drop model of the atomic nucleus to explain the mechanism of nuclear fission. As the experimental physicists studied fission, they uncovered puzzling results. George Placzek asked Bohr why uranium seemed to fission with both fast and slow neutrons. Walking to a meeting with Wheeler, Bohr had an insight that the fission at low energies was due to the uranium-235 isotope, while at high energies it was mainly due to the far more abundant uranium-238 isotope. The former makes up 0.714 percent of the uranium atoms in natural uranium, about one in every 140; natural uranium is 99.28 percent uranium-238. There is also a tiny amount of uranium-234, 0.006 percent.

At the University of Birmingham in Britain, the Australian physicist Mark Oliphant assigned two refugee physicists—Frisch and Rudolf Peierls—the task of investigating the feasibility of an atomic bomb, ironically because their status as enemy aliens precluded their working on secret projects like radar. Their March 1940 Frisch–Peierls memorandum indicated that the critical mass of uranium-235 was within an order of magnitude of 10 kg, which was small enough to be carried by a bomber of the day. Research into how uranium isotope separation (uranium enrichment) could be achieved assumed enormous importance. Frisch's first thought about how this could be achieved was with liquid thermal diffusion.

== Liquid thermal diffusion ==
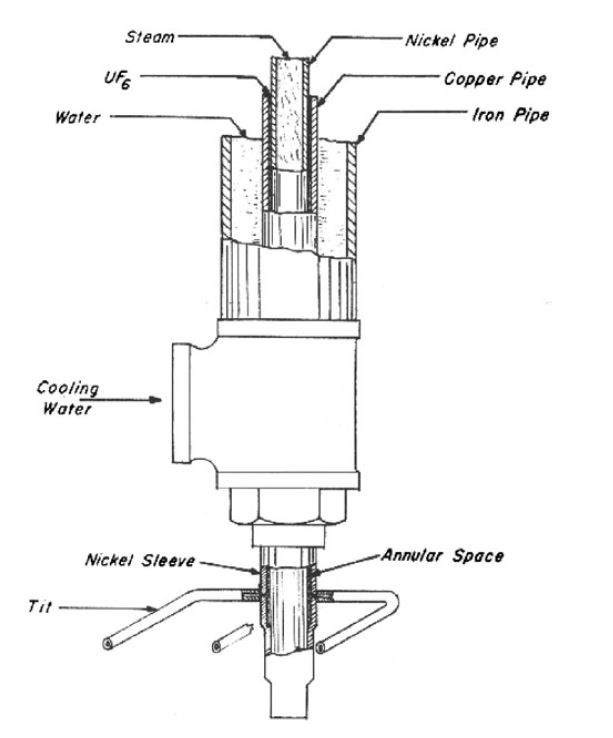
Sectional view of a thermal diffusion process column

The liquid thermal diffusion process was based on the discovery by Carl Ludwig in 1856 and later Charles Soret in 1879, that when a temperature gradient is maintained in an originally homogeneous salt solution, after a time, a concentration gradient will also exist in the solution. This is known as the Soret effect. David Enskog in 1911 and Sydney Chapman in 1916 independently developed the Chapman–Enskog theory, which explained that when a mixture of two gases passes through a temperature gradient, the heavier gas tends to concentrate at the cold end and the lighter gas at the warm end. This was experimentally confirmed by Chapman and F. W. Dootson in 1916.

Since hot gases tend to rise and cool ones tend to fall, this can be used as a means of isotope separation. This process was first demonstrated by Klaus Clusius and Gerhard Dickel in Germany in 1938, who used it to separate isotopes of neon. They used an apparatus called a "column", consisting of a vertical tube with a hot wire down the center. In the United States, Arthur Bramley at the United States Department of Agriculture improved on this design by using concentric tubes with different temperatures.

== Research and development ==
Philip H. Abelson was a young physicist who had been awarded his PhD from the University of California on 8 May 1939. He was among the first American scientists to verify nuclear fission, reporting his results in an article submitted to the Physical Review in February 1939, and collaborated with Edwin McMillan on the discovery of neptunium. Returning to the Carnegie Institution in Washington, D.C., where he had a position, he became interested in isotope separation. In July 1940, Ross Gunn from the United States Naval Research Laboratory (NRL) showed him a 1939 paper on the subject by Harold Urey, and Abelson became intrigued by the possibility of using the liquid thermal diffusion process. He began experiments with the process at the Department of Terrestrial Magnetism at the Carnegie Institution. Using potassium chloride (KCl), potassium bromide (KBr), potassium sulfate (K_{2}SO_{4}) and potassium dichromate (K_{2}Cr_{2}O_{7}), he was able to achieve a separation factor of 1.2 (20 percent) of the potassium-39 and potassium-41 isotopes.

The next step was to repeat the experiments with uranium. He studied the process with aqueous solutions of uranium salts, but found that they tended to be hydrolyzed in the column. Only uranium hexafluoride (UF_{6}) seemed suitable. In September 1940, Abelson approached Ross Gunn and Lyman J. Briggs, the director of the National Bureau of Standards, who were both members of the National Defense Research Committee (NDRC) Uranium Committee. The NRL agreed to make $2,500 available to the Carnegie Institution to allow Abelson to continue his work, and in October 1940, Briggs arranged for it to be moved to the Bureau of Standards, where there were better facilities.

Uranium hexafluoride was not readily available, so Abelson devised his own method of producing it in quantity at the NRL, through fluorination of the more easily produced uranium tetrafluoride at 350 °C (662 °F). Initially, this small plant supplied uranium hexafluoride for the research at Columbia University, the University of Virginia and the NRL. In 1941, Gunn and Abelson placed an order for uranium hexafluoride with the Harshaw Chemical Company in Cleveland, Ohio, using Abelson's process. In early 1942, the NDRC awarded Harshaw a contract to build a pilot plant to produce 10 pounds (4.5 kg) of uranium hexafluoride per day. By the spring of 1942, Harshaw's pilot uranium hexafluoride plant was operational, and DuPont also began experiments with using the process. Demand for uranium hexafluoride soon rose sharply, and Harshaw and DuPont increased production to meet it.

Abelson erected eleven columns at the Bureau of Standards, all approximately 1.5 inches (38 mm) in diameter, but ranging from 2 to 12 feet (0.61 to 3.66 m) high. Test runs were carried out with potassium salts, and then, in April 1941, with uranium hexafluoride. On 1 June 1941, Abelson became an employee of the NRL, and he moved to the Anacostia Naval Air Station. In September 1941, he was joined by John I. Hoover, who became his deputy. They constructed an experimental plant there with 36-foot (11 m) columns. Steam was provided by a 20-horsepower (15 kW) gas-fired boiler. They were able to separate isotopes of chlorine, but the apparatus was ruined in November by the decomposition products of the carbon tetrachloride. The next run indicated 2.5% separation, and it was found that the optimal spacing of the columns was between 0.21 and 0.38 millimetres (0.0083 and 0.0150 in). Abelson regarded a run on 22 June with a 9.6% result as the first successful test of liquid thermal diffusion with uranium hexafluoride. In July, he was able to achieve 21%.

== Relations with the Manhattan Project ==
The NRL authorized a pilot plant in July 1942, which commenced operation on 15 November. This time they used fourteen 48-foot (15 m) columns, with a separation of 25 millimetres (0.98 in) between them. The pilot plant ran without interruption from 3 to 17 December 1942. Colonel Leslie R. Groves, Jr., who had been designated to take charge of what would become known as the Manhattan Project (but would not do so for another two days), visited the pilot plant with the Deputy District Engineer of the Manhattan District, Lieutenant Colonel Kenneth D. Nichols on 21 September, and spoke with Gunn and Rear Admiral Harold G. Bowen, Sr., the director the NRL. Groves left with the impression that the project was not being pursued with sufficient urgency. The project was expanded, and Nathan Rosen joined the project as a theoretical physicist. Groves visited the pilot plant again on 10 December 1942, this time with Warren K. Lewis, a professor of chemical engineering from MIT, and three DuPont employees. In his report Lewis recommended that the work be continued.

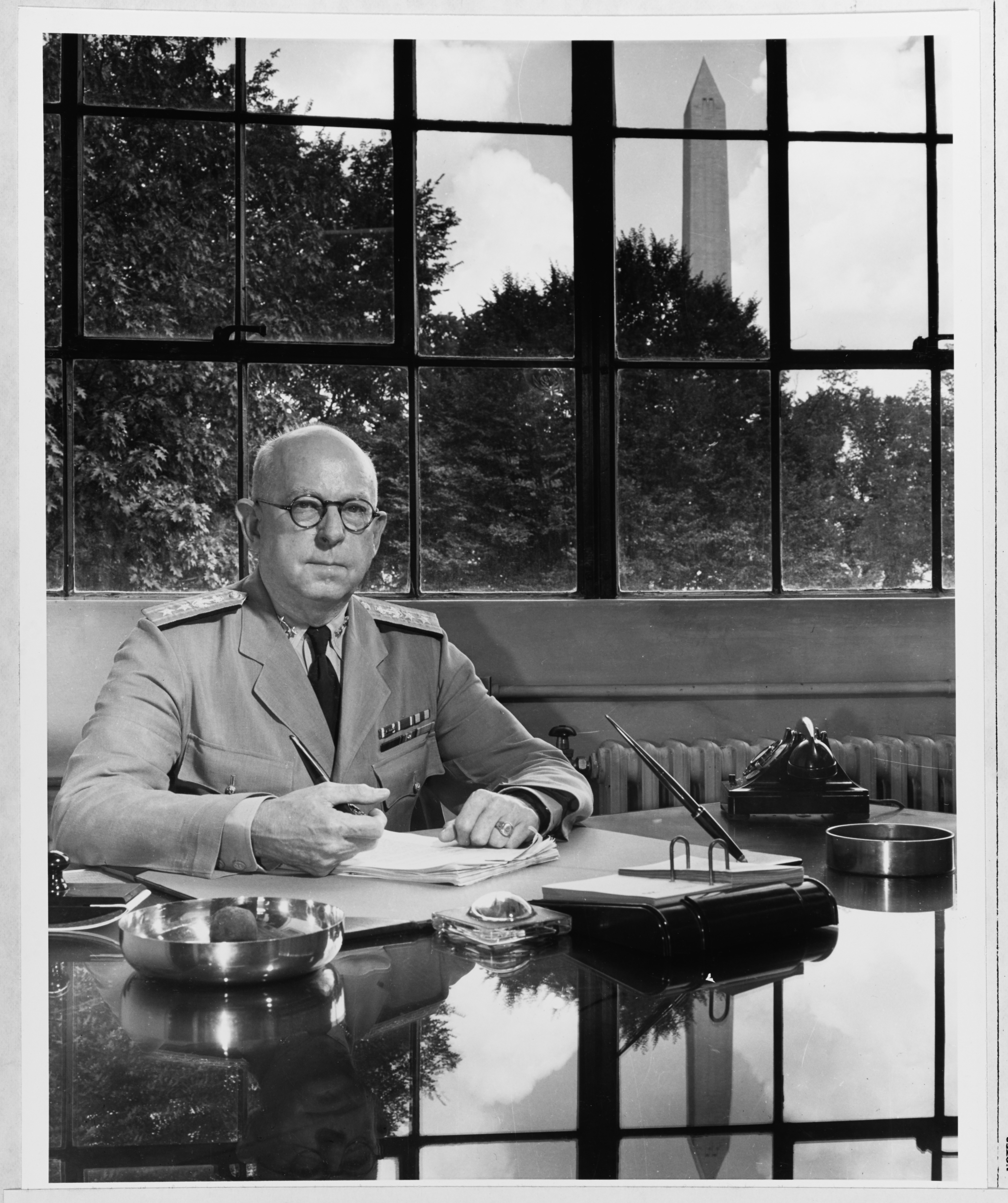
Rear Admiral Harold G. Bowen, Sr., at his desk at the Navy Department, Washington, D.C., during the World War II years.

The S-1 Executive Committee superseded the Uranium Committee on 19 June 1942, dropping Gunn from its membership in the process. It considered Lewis' report, and passed on its recommendation to Vannevar Bush, the director of the Office of Scientific Research and Development (OSRD), of which the S-1 Executive Committee was a part. The relationship between the OSRD and the NRL was not good; Bowen criticised it for diverting funds from the NRL. Bush was mindful of a 17 March 1942 directive from the president, Franklin D. Roosevelt, albeit on his advice, that the navy was to be excluded from the Manhattan Project. He preferred to work with the more congenial Secretary of War, Henry Stimson, over whom he had more influence.

James B. Conant, the chairman of the NDRC and the S-1 Executive Committee, was concerned that the navy was running its own nuclear project, but Bush felt that it did no harm. He met with Gunn at Anacostia on 14 January 1943, and explained the situation to him. Gunn responded that the navy was interested in nuclear marine propulsion for nuclear submarines. Liquid thermal diffusion was a viable means of producing enriched uranium, and all he needed was details about nuclear reactor design, which he knew was being pursued by the Metallurgical Laboratory in Chicago. He was unaware that it had already built Chicago Pile-1, a working nuclear reactor. Bush was unwilling to provide the requested data, but arranged with Rear Admiral William R. Purnell, a fellow member of the Military Policy Committee that ran the Manhattan Project, for Abelson's efforts to receive additional support.

The following week, Briggs, Urey, and Eger V. Murphree from the S-1 Executive Committee, along with Karl Cohen and W. I. Thompson from Standard Oil, visited the pilot plant at Anacostia. They were impressed with the simplicity of the process, but disappointed that no enriched uranium product had been withdrawn from the plant; production had been calculated by measuring the difference in concentration. They calculated that a liquid thermal diffusion plant capable of producing 1 kg per day of uranium enriched to 90% uranium-235 would require 21,800 36-foot (11 m) columns, each with a separation factor of 30.7%. It would take 18 months to build, assuming the use of the Manhattan Project's overriding priority for materials. This included 1,700 short tons (1,500 t) of scarce copper for the outer tubes and nickel for the inner, which would be required to resist corrosion by the steam and uranium hexafluoride respectively.

The estimated cost of such a plant was around $32.6 million to build and $62,600 per day to run. What killed the proposal was that the plant would require 600 days to reach equilibrium, by which time $72 million would have been spent, which the S-1 Executive Committee rounded up to $75 million. Assuming that work started immediately, and the plant worked as designed, no enriched uranium could be produced before 1946. Murphree suggested that a liquid thermal diffusion plant producing uranium enriched to 10% uranium-235 might be a substitute for the lower stages of a gaseous diffusion plant, but the S-1 Executive Committee decided against this. Between February and July 1943 the Anacostia pilot plant produced 236 pounds (107 kg) of slightly enriched uranium hexafluoride, which was shipped to the Metallurgical Laboratory. In September 1943, the S-1 Executive Committee decided that no more uranium hexafluoride would be allocated to the NRL, although it would exchange enriched uranium hexafluoride for regular uranium hexafluoride. Groves turned down an order from the NRL for additional uranium hexafluoride in October 1943. When it was pointed out that the navy had developed the production process for uranium hexafluoride in the first place, the army reluctantly agreed to fulfil the order.

== Philadelphia pilot plant ==
Abelson's studies indicated that in order to reduce the equilibrium time, he needed to have a much greater temperature gradient. The NRL considered building it at the Naval Engineering Experiment Station in Annapolis, Maryland, but this was estimated to cost $2.5 million, which the NRL regarded as too expensive. Other sites were canvassed, and it was decided to build a new pilot plant at the Naval Boiler and Turbine Laboratory (NBTL) at the Philadelphia Navy Yard, where there was space, steam and cooling water, and, perhaps most important of all, engineers with experience with high-pressure steam. The cost was estimated at $500,000. The pilot plant was authorized by Rear Admiral Earle W. Mills, the Assistant Chief of the Bureau of Ships on 17 November 1943. Construction commenced on 1 January 1944, and was completed in July. The NBTL was responsible for the design, construction and operation of the steam and cooling water systems, while the NRL dealt with the columns and subsidiary equipment. Captain Thorvald A. Solberg from the Bureau of Ships was project officer.

The Philadelphia pilot plant occupied 13,000 square feet (1,200 m^{2}) of space on a site one block west of Broad Street, near the Delaware River. The plant consisted of 102 48-foot (15 m) columns, known as a "rack", arranged into a cascade of seven stages. The plant was intended to be able to produce one gram per day of uranium enriched to 6% uranium-235. The outer copper tubes were cooled by 155 °F (68 °C) water flowing between them and the external 4-inch steel pipes. The inner nickel tubes were heated by high pressure steam at 545 °F (285 °C) and 1,000 pounds per square inch (6,900 kPa). Each column therefore held about 1.6 kilograms (3.5 lb) of uranium hexafluoride. This was driven by vapor pressure; the only working parts were the water pumps. In operation, the rack consumed 11.6 MW of power. Each column was connected to a reservoir of 3 to 170 kilograms (6.6 to 374.8 lb) of uranium hexafluoride. Because of the dangers involved in handling uranium hexafluoride, all work with it, such as replenishing the reservoirs from the shipping cylinders, was accomplished in a transfer room. The columns at the Philadelphia plant were operated in parallel instead of in series, so the Philadelphia pilot plant eventually produced over 5,000 pounds (2,300 kg) of uranium hexafluoride enriched to 0.86 percent uranium-235, which was handed over to the Manhattan Project. The Philadelphia pilot plant was disposed of in September 1946, with salvageable equipment being returned to the NRL, while the rest was dumped at sea.

== Construction ==
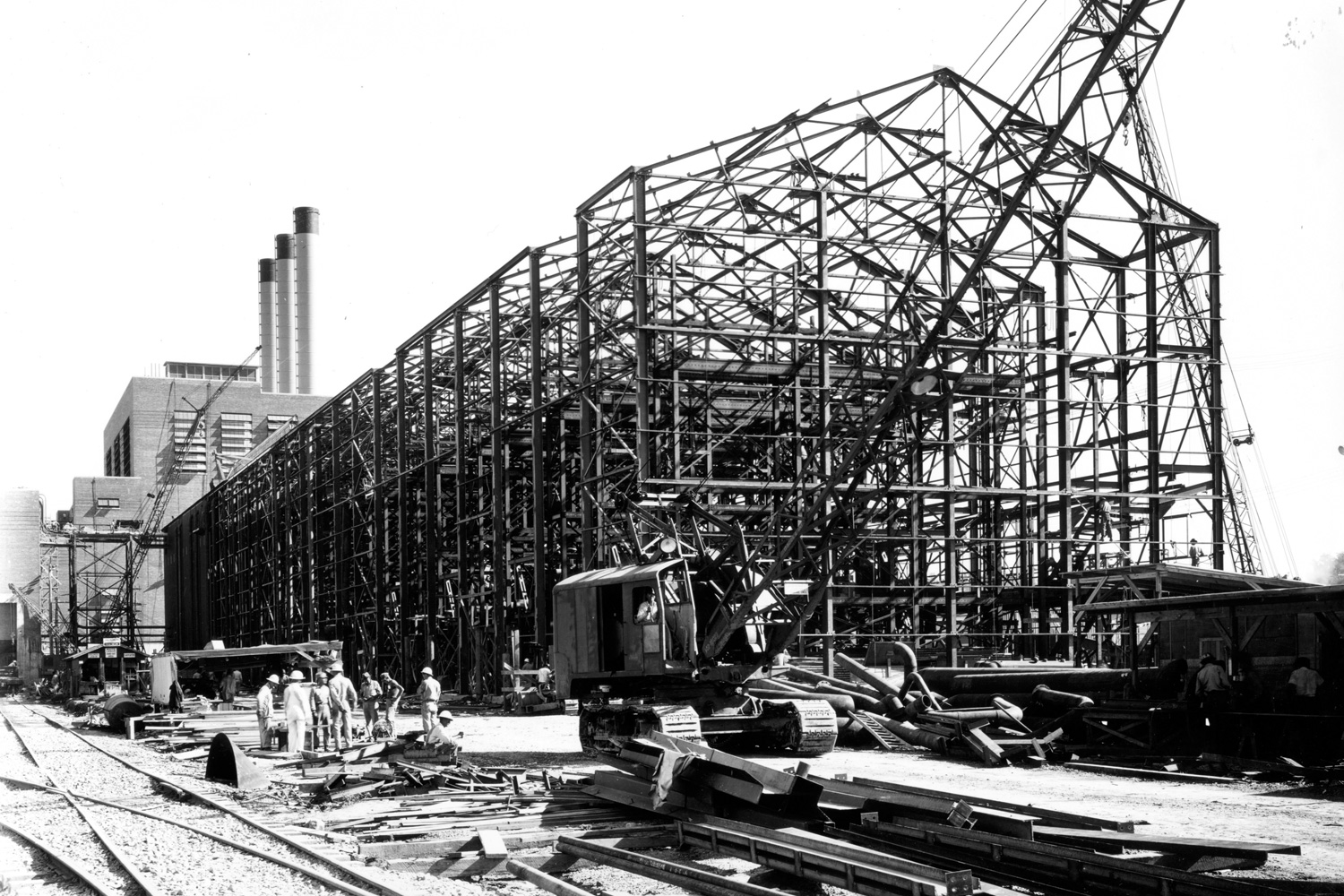
Thermal Diffusion Process Building (F01) at S-50 under construction (ca. August 1944)

In early 1944, news of the Philadelphia pilot plant reached Robert Oppenheimer, the director of the Los Alamos Laboratory. Oppenheimer wrote to Conant on 4 March 1944, and asked for the reports on the liquid thermal diffusion project, which Conant forwarded. Like nearly everyone else, Oppenheimer had been thinking of uranium enrichment in terms of a process to produce weapons grade uranium suitable for use in an atomic bomb, but now he considered another option. If the columns at the Philadelphia plant were operated in parallel instead of in series, then it might produce 12 kg per day of uranium enriched to 1 percent. This could be valuable because an electromagnetic enrichment process that could produce one gram of uranium enriched to 40 percent uranium-235 from natural uranium, could produce two grams per day of uranium enriched to 80 percent uranium-235 if the feed was enriched to 1.4 percent uranium-235, double the 0.7 percent of natural uranium. On 28 April, he wrote to Groves, pointing out that "the production of the Y-12 plant could be increased by some 30 or 40 percent, and its enhancement somewhat improved, many months earlier than the scheduled date for K-25 production."

Groves obtained permission from the Military Policy Committee to renew contact with the navy, and on 31 May 1944 he appointed a review committee consisting of Murphree, Lewis, and his scientific advisor, Richard Tolman, to investigate. The review committee visited the Philadelphia pilot plant the following day. They reported that while Oppenheimer was fundamentally correct, his estimates were optimistic. Adding an additional two racks to the pilot plant would take two months, but would not produce enough feed to meet the requirements of the Y-12 electromagnetic plant at the Clinton Engineer Works. They therefore recommended that a full-scale liquid thermal diffusion plant be built. Groves therefore asked Murphree on 12 June for a costing of a production plant capable of producing 50 kg of uranium enriched to between 0.9 and 3.0 percent uranium-235 per day. Murphree, Tolman, Cohen and Thompson estimated that a plant with 1,600 columns would cost $3.5 million. Groves approved its construction on 24 June 1944, and informed the Military Policy Committee that it would be operational by 1 January 1945.

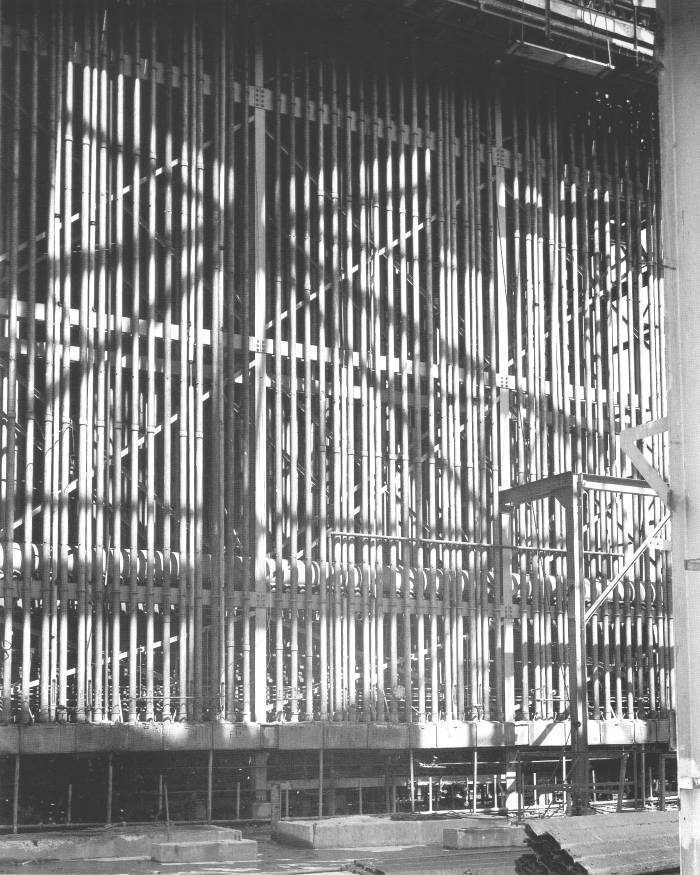
Diffusion columns, S-50 Liquid Thermal Diffusion plant at Oak Ridge, Tennessee, 1945

Sites at Watts Bar Dam, Muscle Shoals and Detroit were considered, but it was decided to build it at the Clinton Engineer Works, where water could be obtained from the Clinch River and steam from the K-25 powerhouse. The thermal diffusion project was codenamed S-50. An S-50 Division was created at the Manhattan District headquarters in June under Lieutenant Colonel Mark C. Fox, with Major Thomas J. Evans, Jr., as his assistant with special authority for plant construction. Groves selected the H. K. Ferguson Company of Cleveland, Ohio, as the prime construction contractor on its record of finishing jobs on time, notably the Gulf Ordnance Plant in Mississippi, on a cost plus fixed fee contract. The H. A. Jones Construction Company would build the steam plant, with H. K. Ferguson as engineer-architect. Although his advisors had estimated that it would take six months to build the plant, Groves gave H. K. Ferguson just four, and he wanted operations to commence in just 75 days.

Groves, Tolman, Fox, and Wells N. Thompson from H. K. Ferguson, collected blueprints of the Philadelphia pilot from there on 26 June. The production plant would consist of twenty-one 102-column racks, arranged in three groups of seven, a total of 2,142 48-foot (15 m) columns. Each rack was a copy of the Philadelphia pilot plant. The columns had to be manufactured to fine tolerances; ±0.0003 inches (0.0076 mm) for the diameter of the inner nickel tubes, and ±0.002 inches (0.051 mm) between the inner nickel tubes and the outer copper tubes. The first orders for columns were placed on 5 July. Twenty-three companies were approached, and the Grinnell Company of Providence, Rhode Island, and the Mehring and Hanson Company of Washington, D.C., accepted the challenge.

Ground was broken at the site on 9 July 1944. By 16 September, with about a third of the plant complete, the first rack had commenced operation. Testing in September and October revealed problems with leaking pipes that required further welding. Nonetheless, all racks were installed and ready for operations in January 1945. The construction contract was terminated on 15 February, and the remaining insulation and electrical work was assigned to other firms in the Oak Ridge area. They also completed the auxiliary buildings, including the new steam plant. The plant became fully operational in March 1945. Construction of the new boiler plant was approved on 16 February 1945. The first boiler was started on 5 July 1945, and operations commenced on 13 July. Work was completed on 15 August 1945.

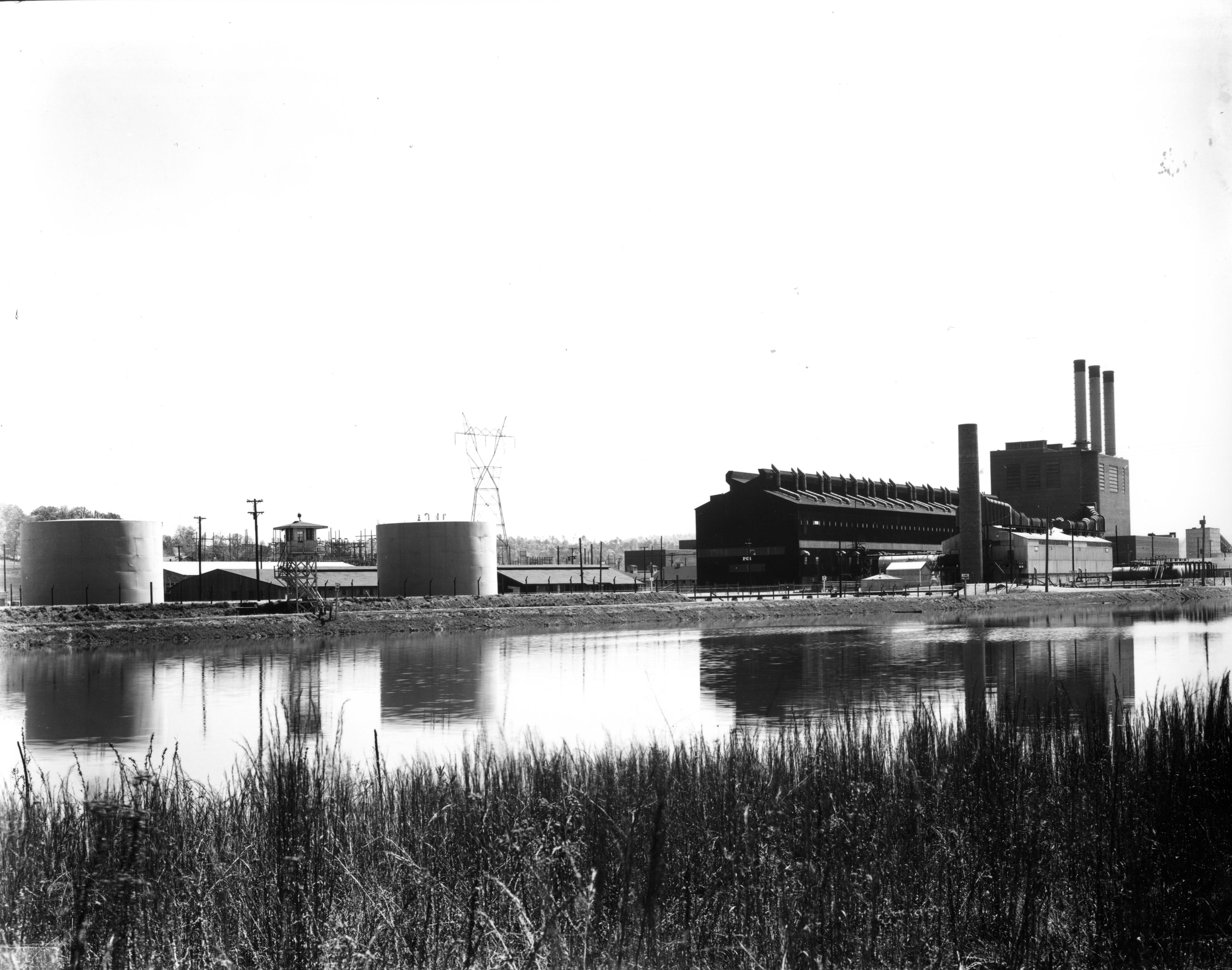
The S-50 Thermal Diffusion Process Building is the dark building. In front is the steam plant. The building in the background with the chimneys is the K-25 powerhouse. In the foreground is the Clinch River.

The Thermal Diffusion Process Building (F01) was a black structure 522 feet (159 m) long, 82 feet (25 m) wide, and 75 feet (23 m) high. There was one control room and one transfer room for each pair of racks, except for the final one, which had its own control and transfer rooms for training purposes. Four pumps drew 15,000 US gallons (57,000 L) per minute of cooling water from the Clinch River. Steam pumps were specially designed by Pacific Pumps Inc. The plant was designed to use the entire output of the K-25 powerhouse, but as K-25 stages came online there was competition for this. It was decided to build a new boiler plant. Twelve surplus 450 pounds per square inch (3,100 kPa) boilers originally intended for destroyer escorts were acquired from the navy. The lower hot wall temperature due to the reduced steam pressure (450 pounds per square inch (3,100 kPa) instead of the 1,000 pounds per square inch (6,900 kPa) of the pilot plant) was compensated for by the ease of operation. Because they were oil-fired, a 6,000,000-US-gallon (23,000,000 L) oil tank farm was added, with sufficient storage to operate the plant for 60 days. In addition to the Thermal Diffusion Process Building (F01) and the new steam plant (F06) buildings, structures in the S-50 area included the pumping station (F02), laboratories, a cafeteria, machine shop (F10), warehouses, a gas station, and a water treatment plant (F03).

== Production ==
For security reasons, Groves wanted H. K. Ferguson to operate the new plant, but it was a closed shop, and security regulations at the Clinton Engineer Works did not allow trade unions. To get around this, H. K. Ferguson created a wholly owned subsidiary, the Fercleve Corporation (from Ferguson of Cleveland), and the Manhattan District contracted it to operate the plant for $11,000 a month. Operating personnel for the new plant were initially trained at the Philadelphia pilot plant. In August 1944, Groves, Conant and Fox asked ten enlisted men of the Special Engineer Detachment (SED) at Oak Ridge for volunteers, warning that the job would be dangerous. All ten volunteered. Along with four Fercleve employees, they were sent to Philadelphia to learn about the plant's operation.

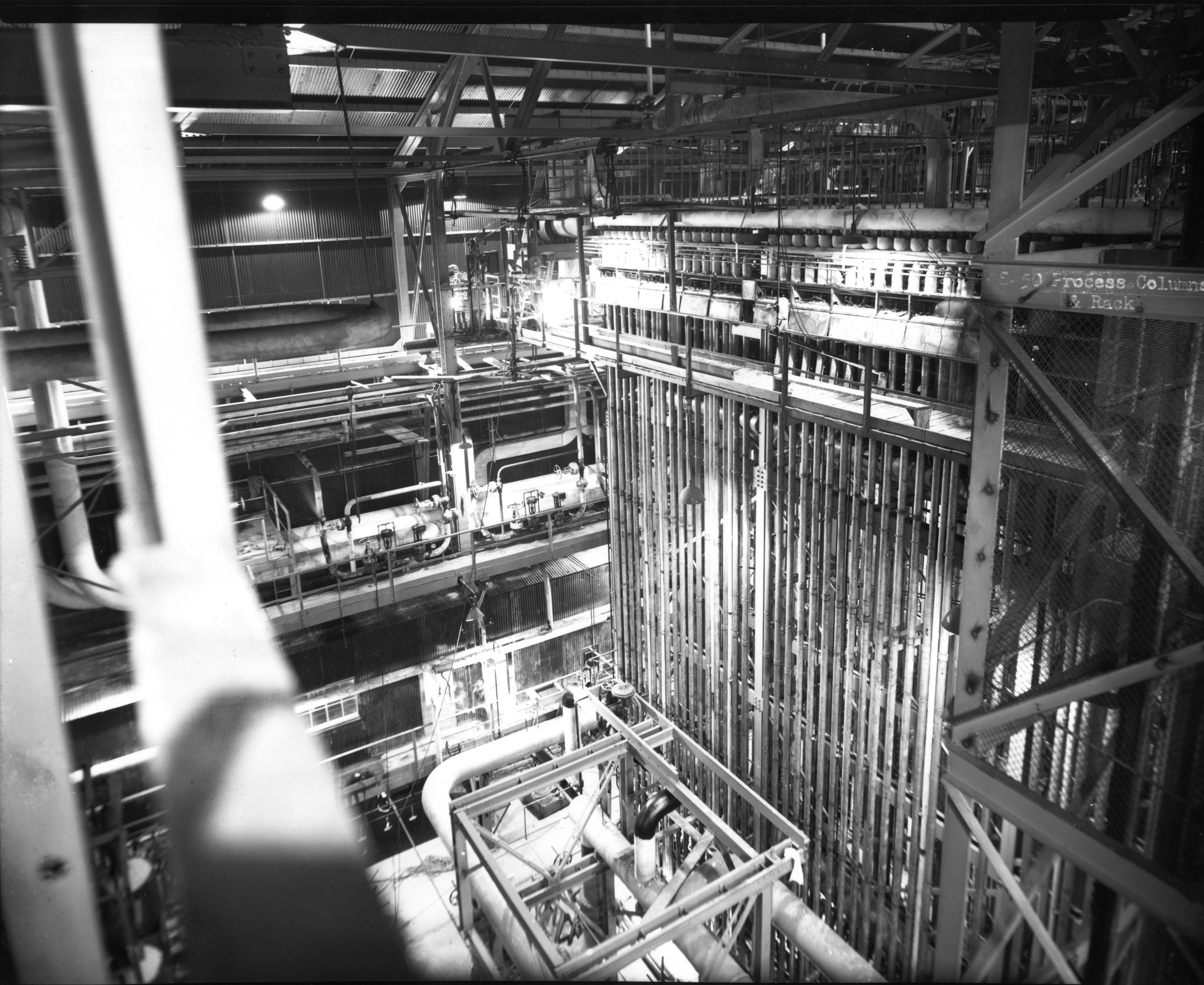
Another view of the columns

On 2 September 1944, SED Private Arnold Kramish, and two civilians, Peter N. Bragg, Jr., an NRL chemical engineer, and Douglas P. Meigs, a Fercleve employee, were working in a transfer room when a 600-pound (270 kg) cylinder of uranium hexafluoride exploded, rupturing nearby steam pipes. The steam reacted with the uranium hexafluoride to create hydrofluoric acid, and the three men were badly burned. Private John D. Hoffman ran through the toxic cloud to rescue them, but Bragg and Meigs died from their injuries. Another eleven men, including Kramish and four other soldiers, were injured but recovered. Hoffman, who suffered burns, was awarded the Soldier's Medal, the United States Army's highest award for an act of valor in a non-combat situation, and the only one awarded to a member of the Manhattan District. Bragg was posthumously awarded the Navy Meritorious Civilian Service Award on 21 June 1993.

Colonel Stafford L. Warren, the chief of the Manhattan District's Medical Section, removed the internal organs of the dead and sent them back to Oak Ridge for analysis. They were buried without them. An investigation found that the accident was caused by the use of steel cylinders with nickel linings instead of seamless nickel cylinders because the army had pre-empted nickel production. The Navy Hospital did not have procedures for the treatment of people exposed to uranium hexafluoride, so Warren's Medical Section developed them. Groves ordered a halt to training at the Philadelphia pilot plant, so Abelson and 15 of his staff moved to Oak Ridge to train personnel there.

There were no fatal accidents at the production plant, although it had a higher accident rate than other Manhattan Project production facilities due to the haste to get it into operation. When the crews attempted to start the first rack there was a loud noise and a cloud of vapor due to escaping steam. This would normally have resulted in a shutdown, but under the pressure to get the plant operational, the Fercleve plant manager had no choice but to press on. The plant produced just 10.5 pounds (4.8 kg) of 0.852% uranium-235 in October. Leaks limited production and forced shutdowns over the next few months, but in June 1945 it produced 12,730 pounds (5,770 kg). In normal operation, 1 pound (0.45 kg) of product was drawn from each circuit every 285 minutes. With four circuits per rack, each rack could produce 20 pounds (9.1 kg) per day. By March 1945, all 21 production racks were operating. Initially the output of S-50 was fed into Y-12, but starting in March 1945 all three enrichment processes were run in series. S-50 became the first stage, enriching from 0.71% to 0.89%. This material was fed into the gaseous diffusion process in the K-25 plant, which produced a product enriched to about 23%. This was, in turn, fed into Y-12, which boosted it to about 89%, sufficient for nuclear weapons. Total S-50 production was 56,504 pounds (25,630 kg). It was estimated that the S-50 plant had sped up production of enriched uranium used in the Little Boy bomb employed in the atomic bombing of Hiroshima by a week. "If I had appreciated the possibilities of thermal diffusion," Groves later wrote, "we would have gone ahead with it much sooner, taken a bit more time on the design of the plant and made it much bigger and better. Its effect on our production of U-235 in June and July 1945 would have been appreciable."

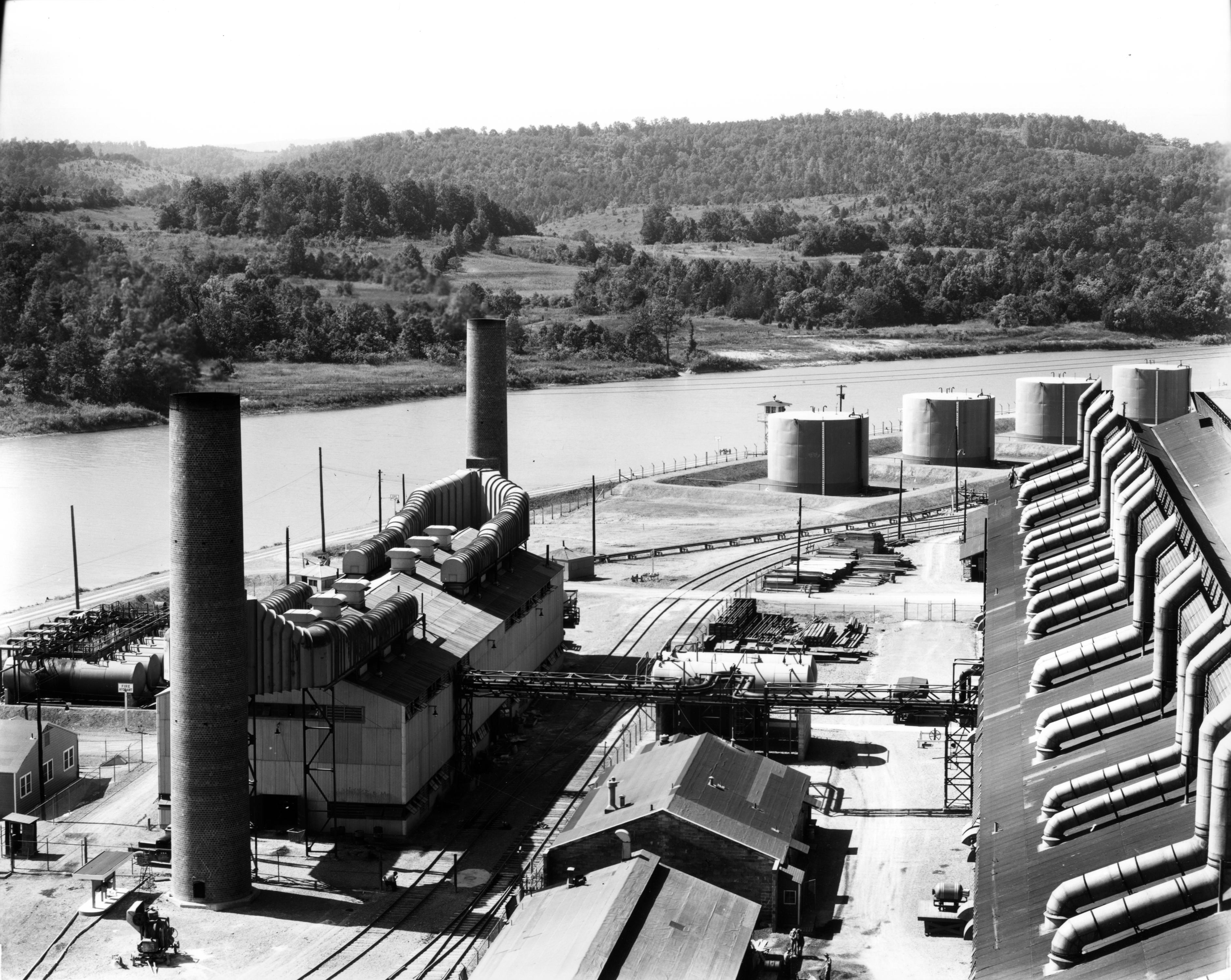
S-50 area, looking towards the Clinch River. New steam plant and the oil storage tanks

== Post-war years ==
Soon after the war ended in August 1945, Lieutenant Colonel Arthur V. Peterson, the Manhattan District officer with overall responsibility for the production of fissile material, recommended that the S-50 plant be placed on stand-by. The Manhattan District ordered the plant shut down on 4 September 1945. It was the only production-scale liquid thermal diffusion plant ever built, but its efficiency could not compete with that of a gaseous diffusion plant. The columns were drained and cleaned, and all employees were given two weeks' notice of impending termination of employment. All production had ceased by 9 September, and the last uranium hexafluoride feed was shipped to K-25 for processing. Layoffs began on 18 September. By this time, voluntary resignations had reduced the Fercleve payroll from its wartime peak of 1,600 workers to around 900. Only 241 remained at the end of September. Fercleve's contract was terminated on 31 October, and responsibility for the S-50 plant buildings was transferred to the K-25 office. Fercleve laid off the last employees on 16 February 1946.

Starting May 1946, the S-50 plant buildings were utilised, not as a production facility, but by the United States Army Air Forces' Nuclear Energy for the Propulsion of Aircraft (NEPA) project. Fairchild Aircraft conducted a series of experiments there involving beryllium. Workers also fabricated blocks of enriched uranium and graphite. NEPA operated until May 1951, when it was superseded by the joint Atomic Energy Commission-United States Air Force Aircraft Nuclear Propulsion project. The S-50 plant was disassembled in the late 1940s. Equipment was taken to the K-25 powerhouse area, where it was stored before being salvaged or buried.
