= Bechtel Jacobs =

American environmental management contractor

Bechtel Jacobs Company LLC is a limited liability company owned by Bechtel and Jacobs Engineering Group that served as the primary contractor to the U.S. Department of Energy (DOE) for waste management and environmental remediation activities on DOE-managed federal government properties in Oak Ridge, Tennessee.

== History ==
Bechtel Jacobs was established as the environmental management contractor for DOE's Oak Ridge operations (including sites in Paducah, Kentucky and Piketon, Ohio, in addition to Oak Ridge) in 1997, when a $2.5 billion management and integration contract was issued to the company. In 2003 Bechtel Jacobs was awarded a new 5-year cost-plus-incentive-fee contract with an estimated value of $1.8 billion. Bechtel Jacobs was replaced as the environmental remediation contractor for the Portsmouth Gaseous Diffusion Plant site in Piketon in 2005, after DOE awarded a new contract to LATA/Parallax Portsmouth, LLC, a joint small business venture of Los Alamos Technical Associates (LATA) and Parallax, Inc. Bechtel Jacobs involvement at the Paducah Gaseous Diffusion Plant site ended in 2006 after DOE entered into a new contract with Paducah Remediation Services LLC (a partnership of Shaw Environmental and Infrastructure and Portage Environmental) for environmental management work there. Bechtel Jacobs' role in Oak Ridge ended in 2011 after the environmental management contract for DOE properties there was awarded to UCOR, a partnership of URS Corporation and CH2M Hill.
