= National Register of Historic Places listings in Pike County, Ohio =

Location of Pike County in Ohio

This is a list of the National Register of Historic Places listings in Pike County, Ohio.

It is intended to be a complete list of the properties and districts on the National Register of Historic Places in Pike County, Ohio, United States. The locations of National Register properties and districts for which the latitude and longitude coordinates are included below, may be seen in a Google map.

There are 8 properties and districts listed on the National Register in the county.

This National Park Service list is complete through NPS recent listings posted August 28, 2026.

== Current listings ==
	Name on the Register	Image	Date listed	Location	City or town	Description
1	Eager Inn	Eager Inn	November 8, 1974 (#74001597)	North of Morgantown off State Route 772; 39°08′32″N 83°11′45″W	Benton Township	
2	Friendly Grove	Friendly Grove	January 26, 1970 (#70000513)	State Route 220, east of Piketon; 39°03′46″N 82°58′16″W	Seal Township	
3	Jones-Cutler House	Jones-Cutler House	April 26, 1976 (#76001509)	Bridge St. in Jasper; 39°02′54″N 83°03′13″W	Newton Township	
4	Piketon Historic District	Piketon Historic District	February 28, 1974 (#74001598)	Bounded by West and 3rd Sts., U.S. Route 23, and the Scioto River; 39°04′09″N 83°00′40″W	Piketon	
5	Piketon Mounds	Piketon Mounds	May 2, 1974 (#74001599)	Mound Cemetery, south of Piketon; 39°03′04″N 83°01′10″W	Seal Township	
6	Scioto Township Works I	Scioto Township Works I	October 9, 1974 (#74001600)	1 mile west of the Scioto River, north of Wakefield; 38°59′47″N 83°01′37″W	Scioto Township	
7	Vanmeter Stone House and Outbuildings	Vanmeter Stone House and Outbuildings	March 31, 1975 (#75001519)	South of Piketon at the junction of U.S. Route 23 and State Route 124; 39°02′39″N 83°01′47″W	Scioto Township	
8	Waverly Canal Historic District	Waverly Canal Historic District	December 20, 1978 (#78002182)	Walnut, North, Emmitt (U.S. Route 23), 2nd, 3rd, and 4th Sts. between Lock and East; 39°07′38″N 82°59′01″W	Waverly	

== See also ==
- List of National Historic Landmarks in Ohio
- Listings in neighboring counties: Adams, Highland, Jackson, Ross, Scioto
- National Register of Historic Places listings in Ohio
