= Vanmeter Stone House and Outbuildings =

Historic house in Ohio, United States

- U.S. National Register of Historic Places
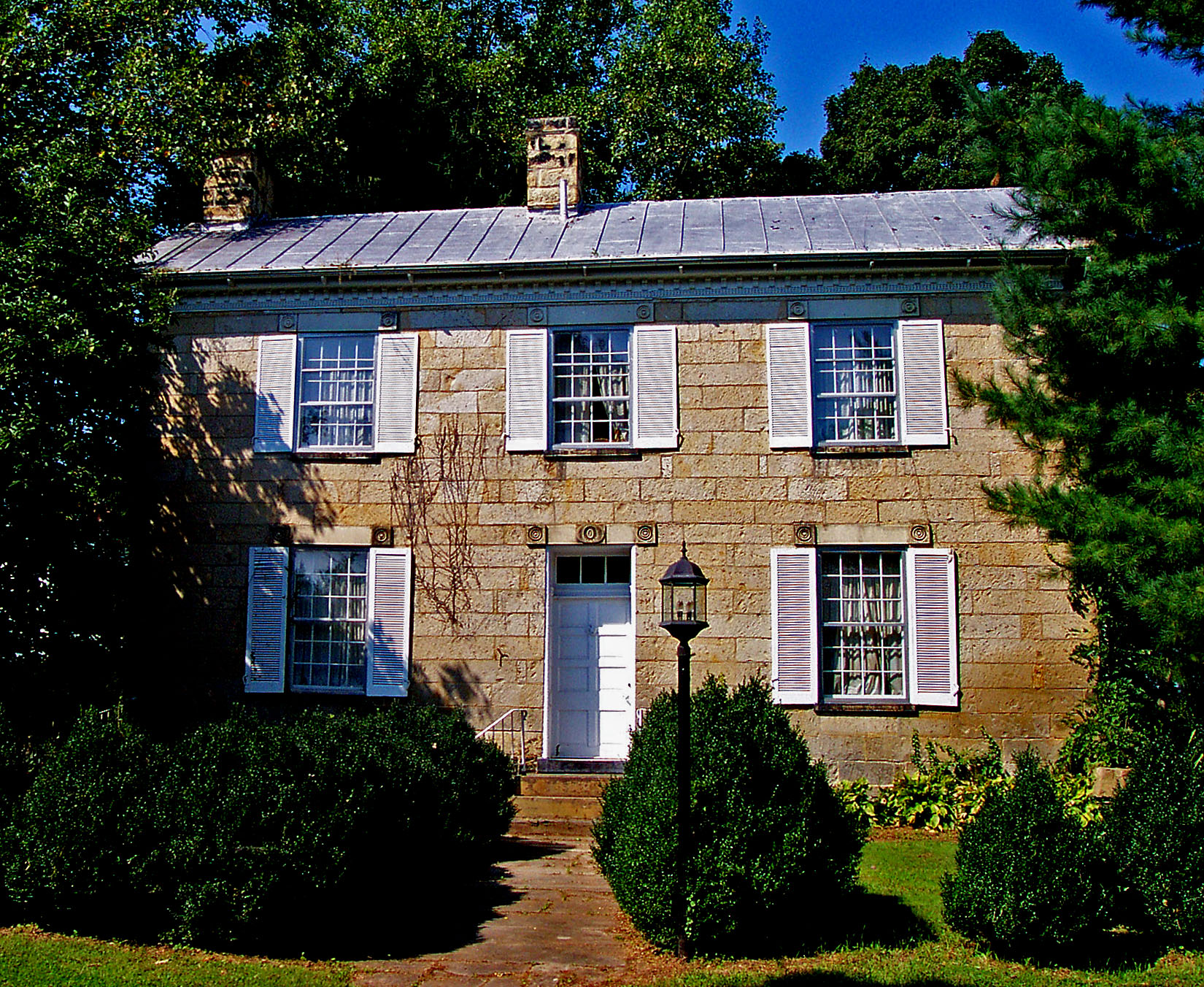
- Front of the house

- Location within Ohio Location within the United States
- Location: South of Piketon at the junction of U.S. Route 23 and State Route 124
- Coordinates: 39°2′39″N 83°1′47″W
- Area: 8 acres (3.2 ha)
- Built: 1823
- NRHP reference No.: 75001519
- Added to NRHP: March 31, 1975

The Vanmeter Stone House and Outbuildings are a historic farmstead located near Piketon in rural Pike County, Ohio, United States. Established in the early 19th century, the farm has been operated for nearly two centuries by the same family, including a prominent politician. Its inhabitants have pioneered forestry in the region and preserved the original buildings to such an extent that they have been named a historic site.

Isaac Vanmeter bought the present property in 1801 from Piketon's founder, a Mr. Guthrie. Vanmeter soon returned to his home in Virginia, giving the land to his son John after the younger Vanmeter completed his undergraduate studies in the East. He later headed westward and settled at the present farmstead, at which the house had been built in 1823. Besides raising livestock and growing a range of crops, Vanmeter was active in politics, serving a term in the United States House of Representatives. Although he moved out of the house in 1856, his family remained in the house; by the 1970s, its residents were the sixth generation of Vanmeters living at the property. Rather than employing the entire property as pasture or crop fields, the family maintained some lands for unusual purposes. As late as the 1890s, the farm extended well to the northeast; the twin Piketon Mounds were part of the property. Meanwhile, the family cut only some trees instead of cutting all down; this unusual decision soon enabled them to begin operating one of Ohio's earliest tree farms.

Vanmeter's house is a simple sandstone and brick I-house featuring details of wood and stone. Covered by a gabled roof with two chimneys, the two-story house has a three-bay front with its main entrance centered amid two windows on the first story and three on the second. No windows are placed in the sides, which are substantially narrower than the front and rear. Typical of southern Ohio's early stone farmhouses, the property still retains some of its early outbuildings as well as the house. In 1975, the house and historic outbuildings were listed together on the National Register of Historic Places, qualifying because of their historically significant architecture; the complex is one of eight National-Register listed locations in Pike County. Four years after the farmstead was designated, a similar honor was given to the Vanmeter Church Street House in Chillicothe to the north, where John Vanmeter moved after leaving his Pike County home.
