= General Matter =

American nuclear-fuel company

- Type: Private
- Industry: Nuclear fuel
- Founded: January 2024
- Founders: Scott Nolan, Ashby Bridges, Drew DeWalt, Lee Robinson
- Headquarters: California, United States
- Key people: Scott Nolan (CEO); Lee Robinson (COO); Peter Thiel (Board Member)
- Products: Low-enriched uranium (LEU), high-assay low-enriched uranium (HALEU)
- Website: GeneralMatter.com

General Matter is an American nuclear-fuel start up company, founded in 2024, that aims to develop domestic uranium enrichment capabilities for low-enriched uranium (LEU) and high-assay low-enriched uranium (HALEU). The company is focused on reducing U.S. dependence on foreign suppliers and supporting the deployment of advanced nuclear reactors. Reuters writes that it is on "a mission to help end Russia's monopoly on a type of more-enriched nuclear fuel."

In August 2025, General Matter leased part of the Paducah Gaseous Diffusion Plant from the United States Department of Energy (DOE), and in January 2026 received a $900 million contract from DOE to produce enriched uranium.

== History ==
General Matter was founded in January 2024. Engineer and venture-capitalist Scott Nolan, a former employee of SpaceX and partner at the Founders Fund, was co-founder. When at SpaceX, Nolan helped to develop the Merlin engine systems and the Dragon capsule. General Matter was incubated at the Founders Fund. Nolan stays as partner at the Founders Fund, he said he would give his full attention to General Matter. In April 2025, the company raised about US$50 million in a Series A funding round led by Founders Fund. Peter Thiel joined the company's board of directors following the investment. Lee Robinson, another founding member, is noted as having worked in intelligence. Bloomberg reports that Robinson "previously led energy investments for the Defense Department's Defense Innovation Unit."

== Contracts and activities ==
In 2024, the United States Department of Energy (DOE) selected General Matter as one of the companies to participate in its program to develop domestic HALEU enrichment capacity.

The company was among six firms competing for an LEU contract valued at up to $3.4 billion, which was granted at the end of the Biden administration.

In March 2026, it was announced in Indo-Pacific Energy Security Ministerial and Business Forum (IPEM) in Tokyo, Japan, co-hosted by Japan's Ministry of Economy, Trade & Industry and the US National Energy Dominance Council (NEDC), that the Export-Import Bank of the United States (EXIM) will offer "up to $2.4bn in potential financing to support the export of US nuclear fuel to Japan" supplied by General Matter. American Nuclear Society's website notes that the financing is intended to support the export of nuclear fuel to Korea as well.

== Mission and technology ==
General Matter is born out of the tech sector's as well as the government's effort to achieve more autonomy in nuclear fuel. Russia currently supplies about 20% of the United States' nuclear fuel, including nearly all of its HALEU, under a sanctions waiver set to expire in 2028. This has prompted efforts to secure alternative sources.

In the Letter of Intent submitted to the US Nuclear Regulatory Commission (NRC) on 2 December 2024, Nolan stated that, "General Matter has been awarded an Indefinite Delivery/Indefinite Quantity (IDIQ) contract by the Department of Energy’s Office of Nuclear Energy (DOE-NE) under Solicitation No. 89243223RNE000031 [...] "This award specifically supports the DOE-NE’s strategic objectives of securing a domestic supply chain of HALEU to support the continued development of advanced reactors and to strengthen US leadership in nuclear technology. As a DOE-NE HALEU IDIQ awardee, General Matter’s anticipated scope of responsibility under future task orders includes the enrichment, storage, and transportation of HALEU".

The company's operations focus exclusively on uranium enrichment — converting uranium hexafluoride (UF_{6}) into enriched uranium — while leaving mining, conversion, and fabrication to other suppliers. The official website of General Matter states that, "Uranium hexafluoride molecules are separated based on the uranium isotope present. This refining process is used to increase the concentration of U-235 from its natural state (0.7%) to be useful for nuclear energy as LEU (3-5%), LEU+ (5-10%) or HALEU (10-20%). General Matter performs only this enrichment step."

The firm describes its technology as "novel" and "scalable". Specific details about the company's enrichment process have not been publicly disclosed. Nolan said that, like SpaceX, the firm is "going back to first principles".

It is noted by The Economist that General Matter faces a range of challenges, including competition with established players (Centrus Energy, Urenco, and Orano) and developing a capital-intensive supply chain.

Critics of HALEU use argue that its high enrichment level poses a potential weapons risk and recommend capping enrichment at 10–12%. Nolan said his company will defer to regulators in determining the appropriate level.

== Paducah enrichment plant ==
In August 2025, General Matter signed a lease agreement with the DOE to develop a commercial uranium enrichment facility at the former Paducah Gaseous Diffusion Plant site in Paducah, Kentucky. The plant is intended to support reshoring advanced manufacturing and operating AI data centers. According to Nucnet, in November 2025, the U.S. Department of Energy issued a request for offers (RFOs) seeking U.S. companies to develop AI data centers and supporting power infrastructure at the former Paducah uranium enrichment site in Kentucky (Funding will rely entirely on applicants; however, 44,000 acres of land have already been prioritized for the program.). The objective is for the AI infrastructure to be operational by the end of 2027, and NucNet cites General Matter as one example of a company involved in related development at the site.

The proposed facility, valued at approximately US$1.5 billion, will redevelop a 100-acre parcel of the site and could create around 140 full-time jobs. Construction is expected to begin in 2026, with operations projected to start between the late 2020s and as late as 2034. The project represents the largest single private investment in western Kentucky's history.

In January 2026, General Matter received a $900 million contract from the U.S. Department of Energy for reshoring to produce American enriched uranium.

== See also ==
- High-assay low-enriched uranium
- Nuclear fuel cycle
- Founders Fund
