= Kyger Creek Power Plant =

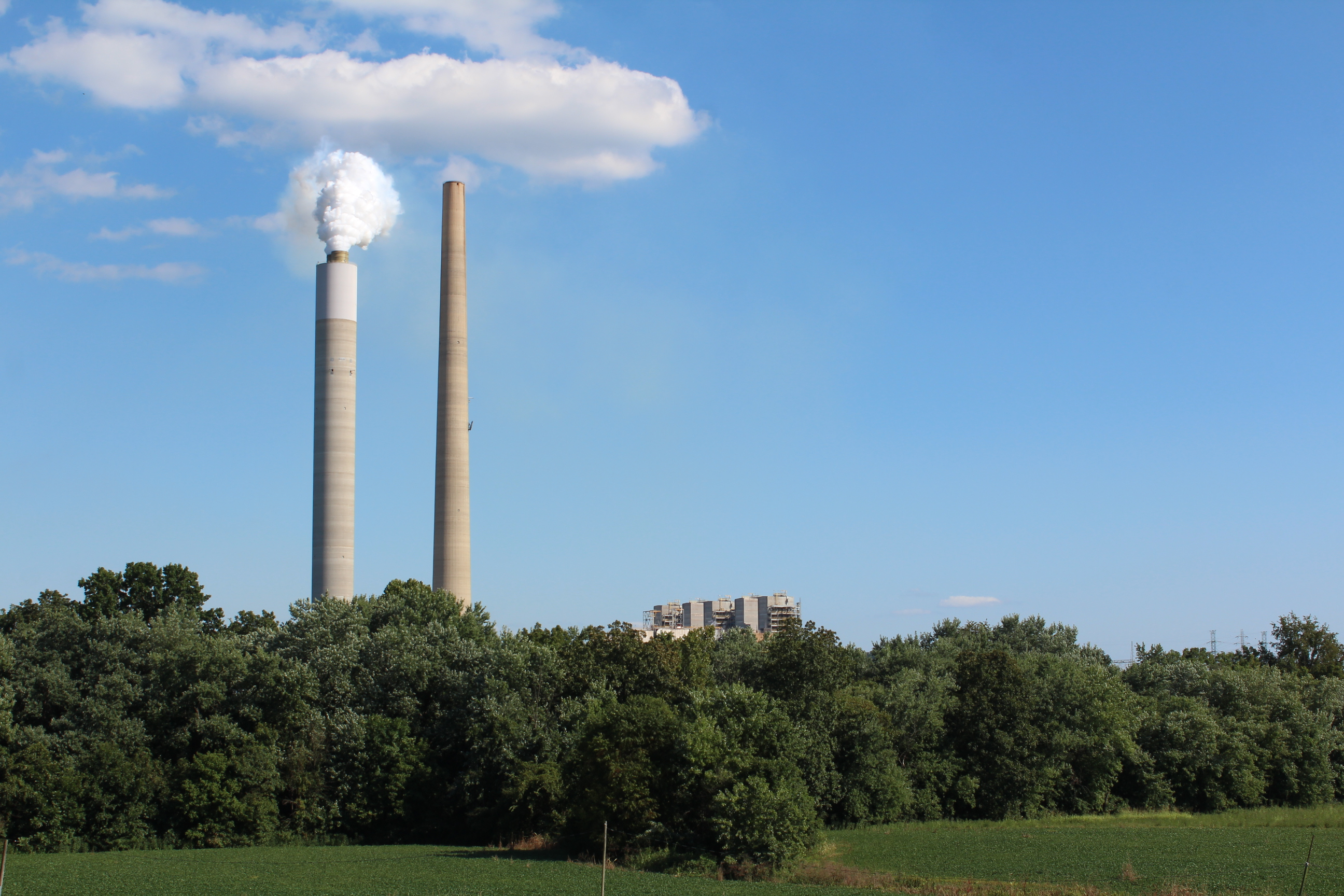
- Kyger Creek Power Plant viewed from Little Kyger Road
- Country: United States
- Location: Addison Township, Gallia County, near Cheshire, Ohio
- Coordinates: 38°54′55″N 82°07′42″W
- Status: Operational
- Commission date: 1955
- Owner: Ohio Valley Electric Corporation
- Operator: Ohio Valley Electric Corporation (OVEC)

Thermal power station
- Primary fuel: Coal
- Cooling source: Ohio River

Power generation
- Nameplate capacity: 1,086 MW

External links
- Commons: Related media on Commons

Kyger Creek Power Plant is a 1.08-gigawatt, 1,086 (MW) coal-fired power station located south of Cheshire, Ohio in Gallia County, Ohio. It is operated by the Ohio Valley Electric Corporation (OVEC).

== History ==
The Kyger Creek was launched into service in 1955. The plant with its five units supplied electricity for the Portsmouth Gaseous Diffusion Plant in Piketon, Ohio along with its sister plant, Clifty Creek Power Plant in Madison, Indiana. The plant supplied electricity Portsmouth Gaseous Diffusion Plant and sold any excess to the markets. In 2003, the United States Department of Energy (DOE) terminated the contract, making Kyger Creek to rely solely on the markets. The Kyger Creek is located 1.6 miles (2.6 km) downstream along the Ohio River from a much larger, newer coal-fired Gavin Power Plant. In July 2019, the State of Ohio signed into law a bill mandating FirstEnergy customers to subsidize Kyger Creek and Clifty Creek. American Electric Power (AEP), Duke Energy, and Dayton Power & Light (DP&L) customers already subsidize these plants based on power usage. However, the bill for FirstEnergy customers to subsidize Kyger Creek was a part of a public corruption scheme revealed by the United States Department of Justice (DOJ) in July 2020.

== Environmental mitigation ==
When Kyger Creek was first constructed, three 538 feet (164 m) smokestacks were constructed to disperse emissions; mitigating the nearby area from soot and foul gases. With amendments added to the Clean Air Act in 1970, regulators pressed Kyger Creek in modernizing their outdated smokestacks. A 1,001 feet (305 m) smokestack, one of the tallest chimneys in the world was built in the mid-1970s. Pollution control systems were installed at Kyger Creek in 2001 to reduce nitrogen oxide (NO_{x}) emissions by 80%. The implementation of two jet bubbling reactor flue-gas desulfurization (FGD) systems in 2011 reduced 98% of sulfur dioxide (SO_{2}) emissions at Kyger Creek.

== See also ==
- List of power stations in Ohio
