= Clifty Creek Power Plant =

Coal-fired power plant in Madison, Indiana, United States

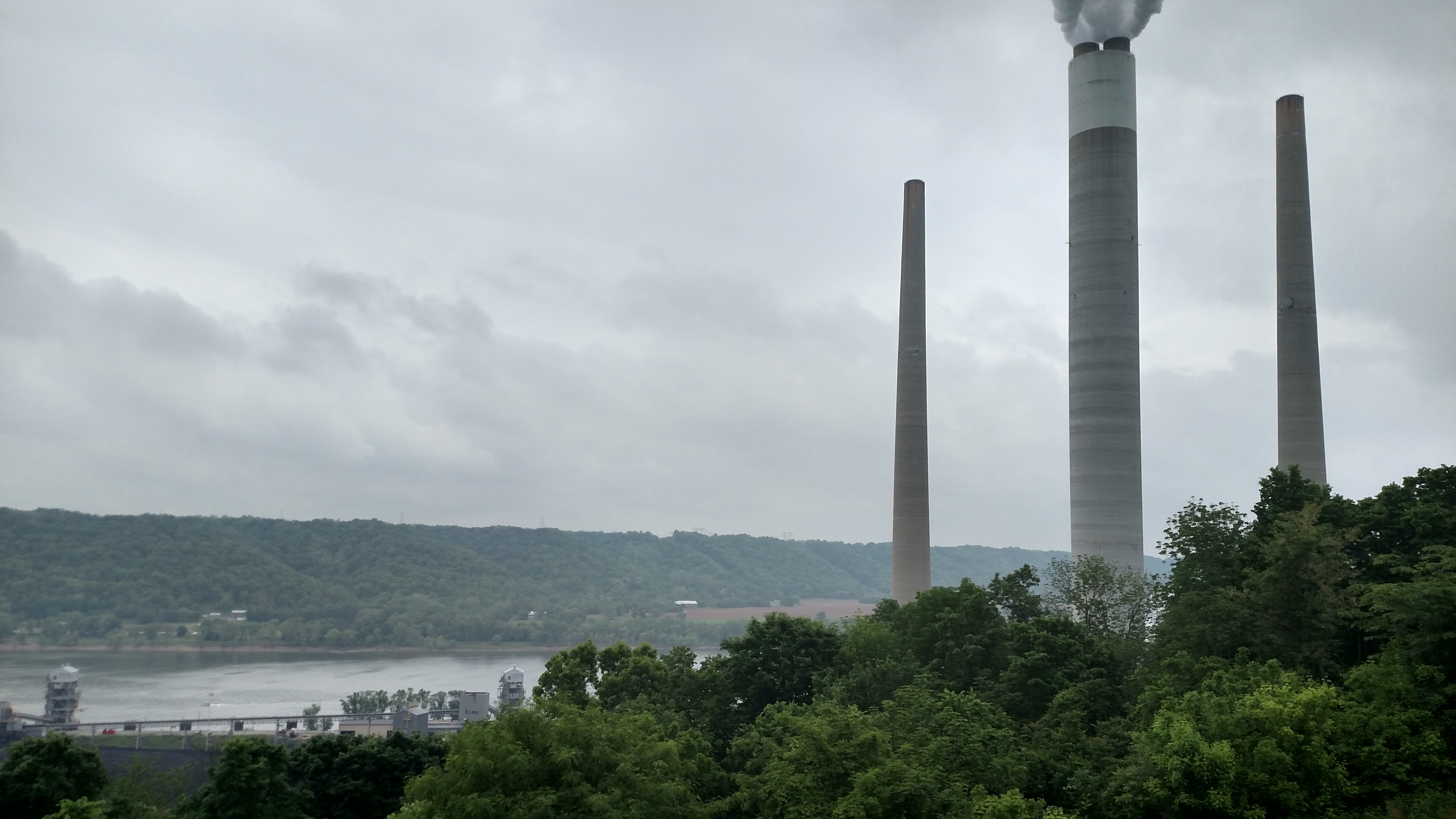
- Clifty Creek Power Plant in May 2015
- Country: United States
- Location: Madison, Indiana
- Coordinates: 38°44′16″N 85°25′08″W
- Status: Operational
- Commission date: Unit 1: February 1955; Unit 2: May 1955; Unit 3: July 1955; Unit 4: October 1955; Unit 5: November 1955; Unit 6: March 1956
- Owner: Ohio Valley Electric Corporation

Thermal power station
- Primary fuel: Subbituminous coal
- Turbine technology: Steam turbine
- Cooling source: Ohio River

Power generation
- Nameplate capacity: 1303 MW

Clifty Creek Power Plant is a 1,300-MW coal-fired power station located in Madison, Indiana. Clifty Creek is operated by the Indiana Kentucky Electric Corporation. It is named after Clifty Creek, which enters the Ohio River nearby.

== Background ==
Five of its six identical units began operating in 1955; the sixth unit was launched in 1956. Its six units supplied electricity for the Portsmouth Gaseous Diffusion Plant in Piketon, Ohio along with its sister plant, Kyger Creek Power Plant in Gallia County, Ohio. It has two of the tallest chimneys in the world, at 980 feet (300 m), with another recently completed dual-flue chimney that stands at around 935 feet (285 m).

Pollution control systems were installed at Clifty Creek in 2001 to reduce nitrogen oxide (NO_{x}) emissions by 80%. With all of its units dating back to mid-1950s, the plant ranked 73rd on the United States list of dirtiest power plants in terms of sulfur dioxide (SO_{2}) emissions per megawatt-hour of electrical energy produced in 2013. However, with the addition of two jet bubbling reactor flue gas desulfurization (FGD) systems in 2013, 98% of sulfur dioxide is now removed.

The facility does not adequately prevent groundwater pollution from its coal ash, and for that reason, the United States Environmental Protection Agency has proposed denying its permit to continue operation. For this reason, the plant faces closure.

== Transmission Lines ==
The plant is connected to the power grid by 6 345-kv lines and 3 138-kv lines. 1 345-kv line goes to the Trimble County Power Plant, which is an interconnection with Louisville Gas & Electric. 1 short 345-kv line connects with the nearby American Electric Power Jefferson 765-kv Station. Finally, 2 double-circuit 345 lines connect with the Pierce Substation in Ohio; on the way, one of the 2 double-circuit lines connects with the AEP and Duke 345-kv network near Lawrenceburg, Indiana, via the Dearborn substation.

== See also ==
- List of power stations in Indiana
- Clifty Falls State Park
- List of coal-fired power stations in the United States
