= Ohio Valley Electric Corporation =

Electric utility in Ohio, United States

The Ohio Valley Electric Corporation (OVEC) is a company jointly owned by several parent electrical utilities. It is headquartered in Piketon, Ohio. OVEC and its wholly owned subsidiary, Indiana-Kentucky Electrical Corporation (IKEC), own and operate two coal-fired electrical generating plants. They are the Kyger Creek Power Plant, located near Gallipolis, Ohio, and the Clifty Creek Power Plant near Madison, Indiana.

== Background ==
In 1952, in order to fulfill the tremendous electrical needs of an atomic enrichment plant the U.S. Atomic Energy Commission was building in Piketon, Ohio, several investor-owned electrical utilities jointly formed two new energy companies—the Ohio Valley Electric Corporation (OVEC) and the Indiana-Kentucky Electrical Company (IKEC). Each new company built a coal-fired electrical generating plant, the Kyger Creek Power Plant near Gallipolis, Ohio, and the Clifty Creek Power Plant near Madison, Indiana. The Clifty Creek Plant had a generating capacity of 1,303,560 kilowatts, and the Kyger Creek Plant had a generating capacity of 1,086,300 kilowatts. The plants were also connected to the electrical transmission network (the "grid") providing for sales of excess and the purchase of additional power. Both plants began producing electricity in 1955.

As the need for electrical power for the atomic plant declined, electrical output from these plants was diverted to domestic use and, in 2003, the affiliation with the United States Department of Energy (DOE) was terminated. The two "sister companies" have merged, with IKEC becoming a wholly owned subsidiary of OVEC, now headquartered in Piketon, Ohio.

In 2018, OVEC joined PJM Interconnection, a regional transmission organization (RTO) to provide additional electricity capacity and integrate its transmission lines.

== Shareholders ==
The current shareholders of OVEC are:

- American Electric Power (AEP)
  - AEP Ohio (assuming operations of former Columbus Southern Power Company)
  - Indiana Michigan Power
- Buckeye Power Generating
- Dayton Power and Light Company (subsidiary of AES Corporation)
- Duke Energy Ohio (formerly Cincinnati Gas & Electric / Cinergy)
- LG&E and KU Energy (subsidiary of PPL)
  - Louisville Gas and Electric
  - Kentucky Utilities
- FirstEnergy
  - Monongahela Power (through former subsidiary Allegheny Energy)
  - Ohio Edison
  - Toledo Edison
- Vectren South (formerly Southern Indiana Gas and Electric Company)
- Peninsula Generating Cooperative

AEP is by far the largest stockholder.
