= John I. Vanmeter =

American politician

John Inskeep Vanmeter
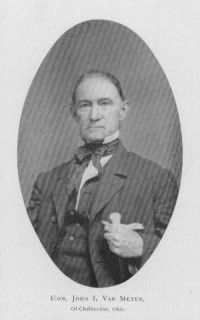

Member of the U.S. House of Representatives from Ohio's 8th district
- In office March 4, 1843 – March 3, 1845
- Preceded by: Joseph Ridgway
- Succeeded by: Allen G. Thurman

Personal details
- Born: February 1798 Moorefield, Virginia, US
- Died: August 3, 1875 (aged 77) Chillicothe, Ohio, US
- Resting place: Grandview Cemetery
- Party: Whig
- Education: College of William & Mary; Princeton College; Litchfield Law School

John Inskeep Vanmeter (February 1798 – August 3, 1875) was a U.S. representative from Ohio.

Born near Moorefield, Virginia (now West Virginia), in February 1798, Vanmeter attended the College of William and Mary, Williamsburg, Virginia, and was graduated from Princeton College in 1821. He studied law at the Litchfield Law School. He was admitted to the bar of Virginia in 1822 and commenced practice in Moorefield. He served as member of the Virginia House of Delegates in 1824. He retired from practice. He moved to Pike County, Ohio, in 1826 and engaged in agricultural pursuits. He served as member of the Ohio House of Representatives in 1836. He served in the Ohio Senate in 1838.

Vanmeter was elected as a Whig to the Twenty-eighth Congress (March 4, 1843 – March 3, 1845). He was an unsuccessful candidate for reelection in 1844 to the Twenty-ninth Congress. He was affiliated with the Democratic Party in 1856.

He moved to Chillicothe, Ohio, in 1855, where he resided until his death August 3, 1875. He was interred in Grandview Cemetery, Chillicothe, Ross County, Ohio, USA.

== Sources ==
- United States Congress. "John Inskeep VANMETER (id: V000048)". Biographical Directory of the United States Congress.

Ohio Senate
Preceded by David Crouse	Ohio State Senator from Ross, Pike & Jackson counties December 5, 1837 – December 1, 1839	Succeeded by John Hough
U.S. House of Representatives
Preceded by Joseph Ridgway	Member of the U.S. House of Representatives from Ohio's 8th congressional district March 4, 1843 – March 3, 1845	Succeeded by Allen G. Thurman
