= Vanmeter Church Street House =

Historic house in Ohio, United States

- U.S. National Register of Historic Places
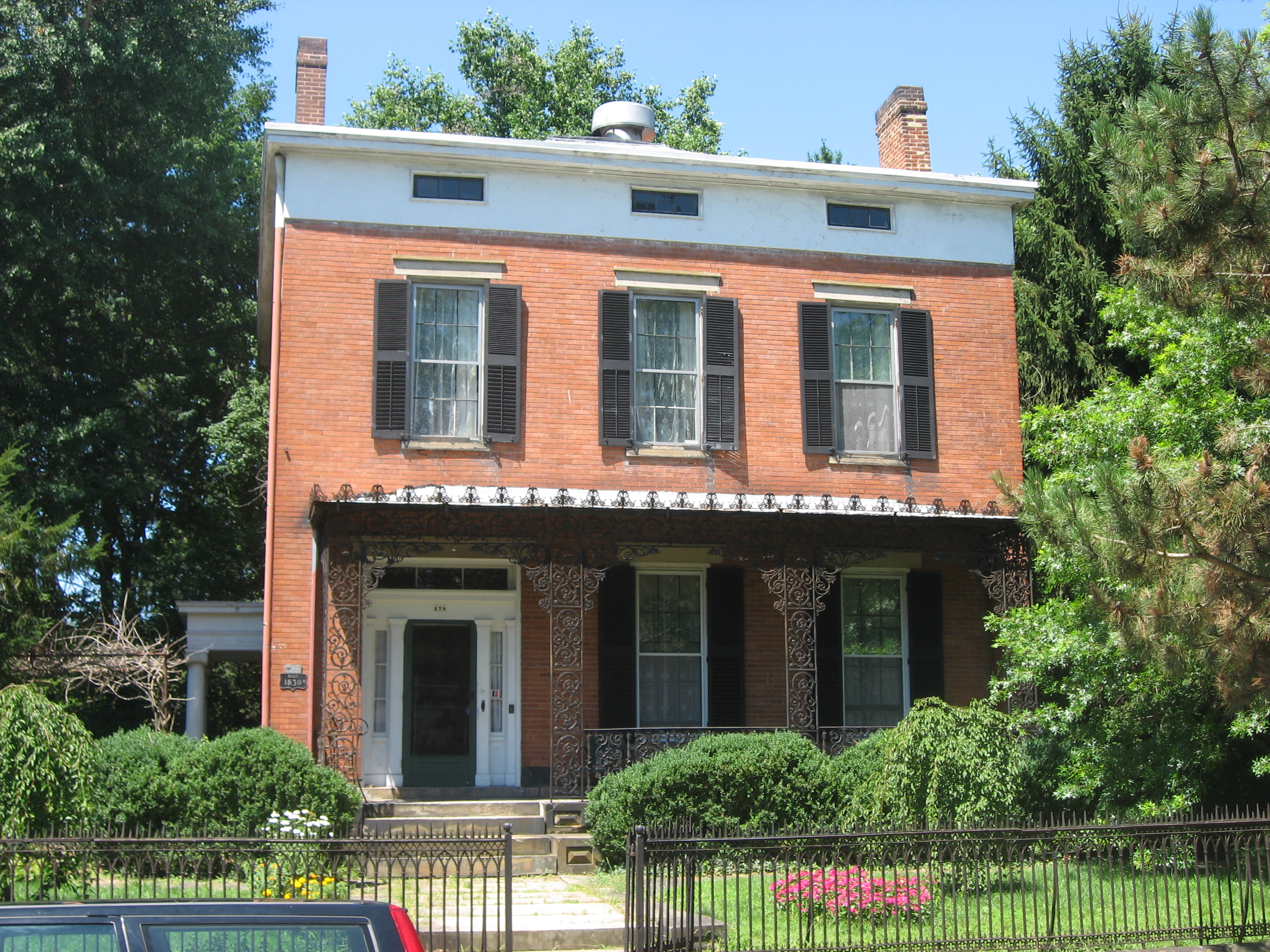
- Front of the house

- Location within Ohio Location within the United States
- Location: 178 Church St., Chillicothe, Ohio
- Coordinates: 39°20′10″N 82°59′29″W
- Area: Less than 1 acre (0.40 ha)
- Built: 1848
- Architectural style: Greek Revival
- NRHP reference No.: 79001935
- Added to NRHP: February 21, 1979

The Vanmeter Church Street House is a historic house located along Church Street in Chillicothe, Ohio, United States. Built in 1848 in the Greek Revival style of architecture, it was erected by farmer William H. Thompson. Just eight years after its completion, the house was bought by Whig Party politician John I. Vanmeter, a Virginia native who had lived in Ross County for thirty years. After serving in both the Ohio House of Representatives and the Ohio Senate during the 1830s, Vanmeter served a single term in the United States House of Representatives from 1843 to 1845.

Vanmeter's house is a two-and-a-half story brick building located within a neighborhood of well-preserved nineteenth-century houses. Built of brick laid in a stretcher bond, and covered with a metal roof, it has been ranked as one of the area's best Greek Revival structures. Upon his death, Vanmeter bequeathed his house to younger family members; in the late 1970s, it was still owned by Vanmeters.

In 1979, the Vanmeter Church Street House was listed on the National Register of Historic Places, along with two associated outbuildings. It qualified for inclusion on the Register both because of its place in local history and because of its well-preserved historic Greek Revival architecture.

== See also ==
- Vanmeter Stone House and Outbuildings
