= Joseph Ridgway =

American politician

Member of the U.S. House of Representatives from Ohio's 8th district
- In office March 4, 1837 – March 3, 1843
- Preceded by: Jeremiah McLene
- Succeeded by: John I. Vanmeter

Member of the Ohio House of Representatives from Franklin County
- In office December 1, 1828 – December 6, 1829
- Preceded by: T. C. Flourney
- Succeeded by: William Doherty
- In office December 6, 1830 – December 4, 1831
- Preceded by: William Doherty
- Succeeded by: P. H. Olmstead

Personal details
- Born: May 6, 1783 Staten Island, New York
- Died: February 1, 1861 (aged 77) Columbus, Ohio
- Resting place: Green Lawn Cemetery
- Party: Whig

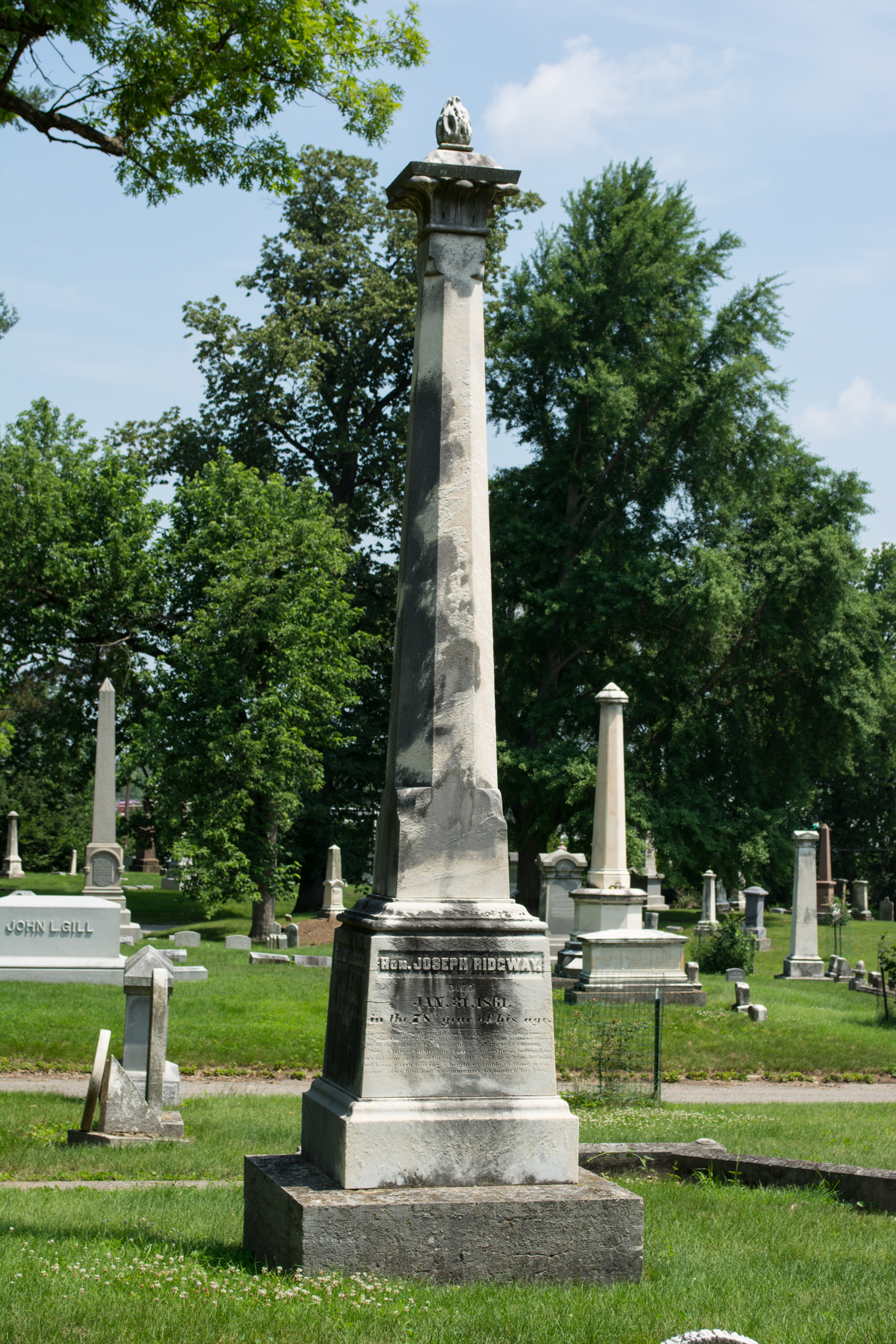
Joseph Ridgway grave at Green Lawn Cemetery in Columbus, Ohio, in the United States. Iron industrialist, he served in the Ohio House of Representatives for two terms, the U.S. House of Representatives for three terms, and the Columbus city council.

Joseph Ridgway (May 6, 1783 – February 1, 1861) was a U.S. representative from Ohio.

Born on Staten Island, New York, Ridgway attended public schools and learned the trade of carpentry. In 1811, he moved to Cayuga County, New York where he began manufacturing plows. He settled in Columbus, Ohio, in 1822 and established an iron foundry. Ridgway served as a member of the Ohio State House of Representatives from 1828 to 1832.

He was elected as a Whig to the Twenty-fifth, Twenty-sixth, and Twenty-seventh Congresses serving from March 4, 1837 to March 3, 1843. He was an unsuccessful candidate for reelection to the Twenty-eighth Congress in 1842. Ridgway also served on the Ohio State Board of Equalization and as a director of the Clinton Bank for twenty years. Additionally, he was a member of the Columbus City Council. He died on February 1, 1861 in Columbus, Ohio and was interred in Green Lawn Cemetery.

== Sources ==
- United States Congress. "Joseph Ridgway (id: R000247)". Biographical Directory of the United States Congress.

U.S. House of Representatives
| Preceded by Jeremiah McLene | Member of the U.S. House of Representatives from Ohio's 8th congressional district March 4, 1837-March 3, 1843 | Succeeded by John I. Vanmeter |
Ohio House of Representatives
| Preceded by T. C. Flourney | Representative from Franklin County; December 1, 1828-December 6, 1829; Served alongside: Daniel Upson | Succeeded by William Doherty |
| Preceded by William Doherty | Representative from Franklin County; December 6, 1830-December 4, 1831 | Succeeded by P. H. Olmstead |
