= Gaseous diffusion =

Old method of enriching uranium

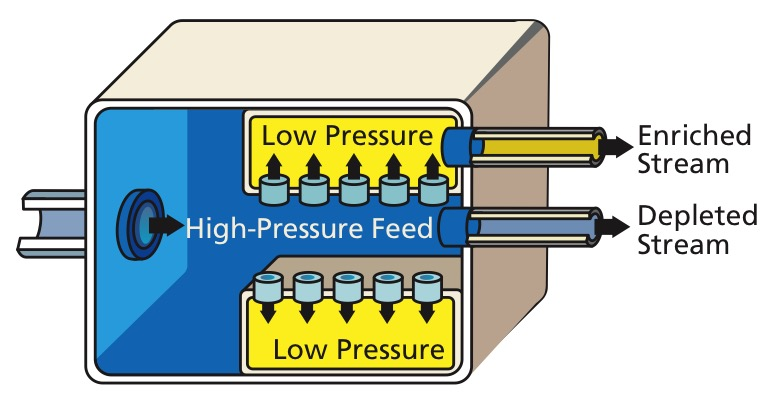
Gaseous diffusion uses microporous membranes to enrich uranium

Gaseous diffusion is a technology that was used to produce enriched uranium by forcing gaseous uranium hexafluoride (UF_{6}) through microporous membranes. This produces a slight separation (enrichment factor 1.0043) between the molecules containing uranium-235 (^{235}U) and uranium-238 (^{238}U). By use of a large cascade of many stages, high separations can be achieved. It was the first process to be developed that was capable of producing enriched uranium in industrially useful quantities, but is nowadays considered obsolete, having been superseded by the more-efficient gas centrifuge process (enrichment factor 1.05 to 1.2).

Gaseous diffusion was devised by Francis Simon and Nicholas Kurti at the Clarendon Laboratory in 1940, tasked by the MAUD Committee with finding a method for separating uranium-235 from uranium-238 in order to produce a bomb for the British Tube Alloys project. The prototype gaseous diffusion equipment itself was manufactured by Metropolitan-Vickers (MetroVick) at Trafford Park, Manchester, at a cost of £150,000 for four units (est. £10–11 million today), for the M. S. Factory, Valley. This work was later transferred to the United States when the Tube Alloys project became subsumed by the later Manhattan Project.

== Background ==
Of the 33 known radioactive primordial nuclides, two (^{235}U and ^{238}U) are isotopes of uranium. These two isotopes are similar in many ways, except that only ^{235}U is fissile (capable of sustaining a nuclear chain reaction of nuclear fission with thermal neutrons). In fact, ^{235}U is the only naturally occurring fissile nucleus. Because natural uranium is only about 0.72% ^{235}U by mass, it must be enriched to a concentration of 2–5% to be able to support a continuous nuclear chain reaction when normal water is used as the moderator. The product of this enrichment process is called enriched uranium.

== Technology ==
Scientific basis

Gaseous diffusion is based on Graham's law, which states that the rate of effusion of a gas is inversely proportional to the square root of its molecular mass. For example, in a box with a microporous membrane containing a mixture of two gases, the lighter molecules will pass out of the container more rapidly than the heavier molecules, if the pore diameter is smaller than the mean free path length (molecular flow). The gas leaving the container is somewhat enriched in the lighter molecules, while the residual gas is somewhat depleted. A single container wherein the enrichment process takes place through gaseous diffusion is called a diffuser.

Uranium hexafluoride

UF_{6} is the only compound of uranium sufficiently volatile to be used in the gaseous diffusion process. Fortunately, fluorine consists of only a single isotope ^{19}F, so that the 1% difference in molecular weights between ^{235}UF_{6} and ^{238}UF_{6} is due only to the difference in weights of the uranium isotopes. For these reasons, UF_{6} is the only choice as a feedstock for the gaseous diffusion process. UF_{6}, a solid at room temperature, sublimes at 56.4 °C (133 °F) at 1 atmosphere. The triple point is at 64.05 °C and 1.5 bar. Applying Graham's law gives:

$${\mbox{Rate}_1 \over \mbox{Rate}_2}=\sqrt{M_2 \over M_1}=\sqrt{352.041206 \over 349.034348}=1.004298...$$

where:

Rate_{1} is the rate of effusion of ^{235}UF_{6}.
Rate_{2} is the rate of effusion of ^{238}UF_{6}.
M_{1} is the molar mass of ^{235}UF_{6} = 235.043930 + 6 × 18.998403 = 349.034348 g·mol^{−1}
M_{2} is the molar mass of ^{238}UF_{6} = 238.050788 + 6 × 18.998403 = 352.041206 g·mol^{−1}

This explains the 0.4% difference in the average velocities of ^{235}UF_{6} molecules over that of ^{238}UF_{6} molecules.

UF_{6} is a highly corrosive substance. It is an oxidant and a Lewis acid which is able to bind to fluoride, for instance the reaction of copper(II) fluoride with uranium hexafluoride in acetonitrile is reported to form copper(II) heptafluorouranate(VI), Cu(UF_{7})_{2}. It reacts with water to form a solid compound, and is very difficult to handle on an industrial scale. As a consequence, internal gaseous pathways must be fabricated from austenitic stainless steel and other heat-stabilized metals. Non-reactive fluoropolymers such as Teflon must be applied as a coating to all valves and seals in the system.

Barrier materials

Gaseous diffusion plants typically use aggregate barriers (porous membranes) constructed of sintered nickel or aluminum, with a pore size of 10–25 nanometers (this is less than one-tenth the mean free path of the UF_{6} molecule). They may also use film-type barriers, which are made by boring pores through an initially nonporous medium. One way this can be done is by removing one constituent in an alloy, for instance using hydrogen chloride to remove the zinc from silver-zinc (Ag-Zn) or sodium hydroxide to remove aluminum from Ni-Al alloy.

Energy requirements

Because the molecular weights of ^{235}UF_{6} and ^{238}UF_{6} are nearly equal, very little separation of the ^{235}U and ^{238}U occurs in a single pass through a barrier, that is, in one diffuser. It is therefore necessary to connect a great many diffusers together in a sequence of stages, using the outputs of the preceding stage as the inputs for the next stage. Such a sequence of stages is called a cascade. In practice, diffusion cascades require thousands of stages, depending on the desired level of enrichment.

All components of a diffusion plant must be maintained at an appropriate temperature and pressure to assure that the UF_{6} remains in the gaseous phase. The gas must be compressed at each stage to make up for a loss in pressure across the diffuser. This leads to compression heating of the gas, which then must be cooled before entering the diffuser. The requirements for pumping and cooling make diffusion plants enormous consumers of electric power. Because of this, gaseous diffusion was the most expensive method used until recently for producing enriched uranium.

== History ==
Staff working on the Manhattan Project in Oak Ridge, Tennessee, developed several different methods for the separation of isotopes of uranium. Three of these methods were used sequentially at three different plants in Oak Ridge to produce the ^{235}U for "Little Boy" and other early nuclear weapons. In the first step, the S-50 uranium enrichment facility used the thermal diffusion process to enrich the uranium from 0.7% up to nearly 2% ^{235}U. This product was then fed into the gaseous diffusion process at the K-25 plant, the product of which was around 23% ^{235}U. Finally, this material was fed into calutrons at the Y-12. These machines (a type of mass spectrometer) employed electromagnetic isotope separation to boost the final ^{235}U concentration to about 84%.

The preparation of UF_{6} feedstock for the K-25 gaseous diffusion plant was the first ever application for commercially produced fluorine, and significant obstacles were encountered in the handling of both fluorine and UF_{6}. For example, before the K-25 gaseous diffusion plant could be built, it was first necessary to develop non-reactive chemical compounds that could be used as coatings, lubricants and gaskets for the surfaces that would come into contact with the UF_{6} gas (a highly reactive and corrosive substance). Scientists of the Manhattan Project recruited William T. Miller, a professor of organic chemistry at Cornell University, to synthesize and develop such materials, because of his expertise in organofluorine chemistry. Miller and his team developed several novel non-reactive chlorofluorocarbon polymers that were used in this application.

Calutrons were inefficient and expensive to build and operate. As soon as the engineering obstacles posed by the gaseous diffusion process had been overcome and the gaseous diffusion cascades began operating at Oak Ridge in 1945, all of the calutrons were shut down. The gaseous diffusion technique then became the preferred technique for producing enriched uranium.

At the time of their construction in the early 1940s, the gaseous diffusion plants were some of the largest buildings ever constructed. Large gaseous diffusion plants were constructed by the United States, the Soviet Union (including a plant that is now in Kazakhstan), the United Kingdom, France, and China. Most of these have now closed or are expected to close, unable to compete economically with newer enrichment techniques. Some of the technology used in pumps and membranes remains top secret. Some of the materials that were used remain subject to export controls, as a part of the continuing effort to control nuclear proliferation.

== Current status ==
In 2008, gaseous diffusion plants in the United States and France still generated 33% of the world's enriched uranium. However, the French plant (Eurodif's Georges-Besse plant) definitively closed in June 2012, and the Paducah Gaseous Diffusion Plant in Kentucky operated by the United States Enrichment Corporation (USEC) (the last fully functioning uranium enrichment facility in the United States to employ the gaseous diffusion process) ceased enrichment in 2013. The only other such facility in the United States, the Portsmouth Gaseous Diffusion Plant in Ohio, ceased enrichment activities in 2001. Since 2010, the Ohio site is now used mainly by AREVA, a French conglomerate, for the conversion of depleted UF_{6} to uranium oxide.

As existing gaseous diffusion plants became obsolete, they were replaced by second generation gas centrifuge technology, which requires far less electric power to produce equivalent amounts of separated uranium. AREVA replaced its Georges Besse gaseous diffusion plant with the Georges Besse II centrifuge plant.

== See also ==
- Capenhurst nuclear site
- Fick's laws of diffusion
- K-25
- Lanzhou uranium enrichment plant
- Marcoule
- Molecular diffusion
- Nuclear fuel cycle
- Thomas Graham (chemist)
- Tomsk
