= Centrus Energy =

American nuclear fuel supply company

Centrus Energy Corp.
- Type: Public
- Traded as: NYSE: LEU; S&P 600 component
- Industry: Nuclear Fuel
- Founded: 1992 (as USEC)
- Headquarters: Bethesda, Maryland United States
- Key people: Amir Vexler (President and CEO)
- Products: Nuclear fuel and services
- Revenue: ▲US$449 million (2025)
- Net income: ▲US$77.8 million (2025)
- Number of employees: 266 (in 2021)
- Website: centrusenergy.com

Centrus Energy Corp. (formerly USEC Inc.) is an American company that supplies nuclear fuel for use in nuclear power plants and works to develop and deploy centrifuge technology to produce enriched uranium for commercial and government uses, including for national security.

In 2019, Centrus began work under a contract with the U.S. Department of Energy to build a cascade of 16 centrifuges in Piketon, Ohio to demonstrate production of high-assay, low-enriched uranium, or HALEU. HALEU is required for many next generation reactor designs, including nine of the ten reactor designs selected under the Energy Department's Advanced Reactor Demonstration Program.

In June 2021, the U.S. Nuclear Regulatory Commission approved a license amendment request for Centrus to enrich uranium up to a uranium-235 concentration of 20 percent, making it the first U.S. facility licensed for HALEU production. This is higher than the 5 percent level found in low-enriched uranium that is used in existing light-water reactors.

== History ==
The Energy Policy Act of 1992 created the United States Enrichment Corporation out of the Department of Energy as a state owned enterprise to enrich uranium for civilian use, and in July 1993 USEC took over DOE facilities. USEC was fully privatized by the U.S. government on July 28, 1998, through an initial public offering. The U.S. government received about three billion dollars for USEC.

USEC had gaseous diffusion plants at Piketon, Ohio near Portsmouth and in McCracken County, Kentucky, near Paducah. The United States Nuclear Regulatory Commission assumed regulatory authority over the Portsmouth facility in March 1997 and on June 5, 1998, the agency made an investigation into alleged "failure to control components with uranium deposits, inadequate maintenance, testing and operation of safety valves on equipment, and exceeding the possession limit for uranium enriched greater than 20 percent." In May 2001, USEC ceased uranium enrichment operations in Piketon and consolidated operations in Paducah, Kentucky. The following year, transfer and shipping operations were also consolidated at Paducah.

A demonstration gas centrifuge plant was being built at Piketon for initial commercial operation in 2009, while a full-sized plant was planned for operation there in 2012. However, in July 2009 the DOE did not grant a $2 billion loan guarantee for the planned uranium-enrichment facility in Piketon, "causing the initiative to go into financial meltdown," the USEC spokesperson Elizabeth Stuckle said, adding "we are now forced to initiate steps to demobilize the project."

On July 28, 2009, the company said that it was suspending work on the project because of the Department of Energy's decision not to provide loan guarantees. The Energy Department said that the proposed plant was not ready for commercial production and therefore ineligible for the loan guarantees. The department said that if USEC withdraws its application, it will receive $45 million over the next 18 months to conduct further research.

Before its downsizing and final cessation of uranium enrichment on May 31, 2013, the Paducah Gaseous Diffusion Plant consumed about 3,000 megawatts of electricity at peak operation. Power for the Paducah gaseous diffusion plant came from the Tennessee Valley Authority (TVA). In 2012 the majority of the TVA grid was generated by coal fired plants, with three nuclear power plants counting for about 30 percent of TVA's energy.

The Department of Energy remains responsible for clean-up of the sites of materials left there prior to 1993.

USEC was the executive agent in the U.S./Russia Highly Enriched Uranium Purchase Agreement, implemented under the Megatons to Megawatts Program.

On December 16, 2013, USEC announced that it had reached an agreement with a majority of its debt holders to file a prearranged and voluntary Chapter 11 bankruptcy restructuring in the first quarter of 2014. On September 30, 2014, executives announced that the company had emerged from bankruptcy proceedings with a new name, Centrus Energy Corp.

On March 5, 2015, the Centrus Board of Directors appointed Daniel B. Poneman as president and chief executive officer and as a director of the company, effective on or before April 1, 2015.

In October 2015, the U.S. Department of Energy issued a report to Congress which evaluated options to resume U.S.-technology enrichment operations to meet U.S. national security mission needs. The report concluded that Centrus' AC100 centrifuge technology was "the most technically advanced and lowest-risk option."

Subsequent to signing the contract with the Department of Energy in 2019, to build the HALEU demonstration plant, Centrus signed a series of agreements with advanced reactor developers including TerraPower, X-Energy, and Oklo, to support the availability of HALEU.

After several years of losses, on March 28, 2021, the company announced that it returned to profitability in 2020 as a result of declining supply costs and other factors. The company reported positive net income of $54 million in 2020 and $175 million in 2021.
