= Portsmouth Gaseous Diffusion Plant =

Former uranium enrichment plant in Pike County, Ohio, USA

Coordinates: 39°00′30″N 83°00′00″W

Portsmouth Gaseous Diffusion Plant is a facility located in Scioto Township, Pike County, Ohio, just south of Piketon, Ohio, that previously produced enriched uranium, including highly enriched weapons-grade uranium, for the United States Atomic Energy Commission (AEC), the U.S. nuclear weapons program, and Navy nuclear propulsion. In later years, it produced low-enriched uranium for fuel for commercial nuclear power reactors. The site never hosted an operating nuclear reactor.

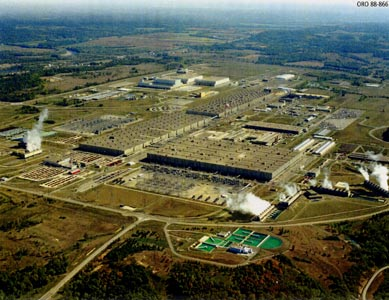

The plant, so named because of its proximity to the city of Portsmouth, Ohio, approximately 22 miles south of the site, was one of three gaseous diffusion plants in the U.S., alongside the K-25 plant in Oak Ridge, Tennessee, and the Paducah Gaseous Diffusion Plant near Paducah, Kentucky. The plant was constructed between 1952 and 1956, with the first enrichment cells going online in 1954.

The former plant facilities are currently undergoing decontamination and decommissioning (D&D). Some site facilities are overseen by the United States Enrichment Corporation, a subsidiary of Centrus Energy. The D&D work on the older facilities to prepare the site for future use is expected to continue through 2024 and is being conducted by Fluor-B&W Portsmouth LLC.

== Design ==
The former gaseous diffusion plant covers 640 acres (260 hectares) of the 3,777-acre (1,528-hectare) site. The largest buildings – the process buildings – have a combined length of approximately one and a half miles (2.4 kilometers), and cover about 93 acres (38 hectares) and contain 10 million square feet (0.93 square kilometres) of space. In use, the plant consumed a peak electrical demand of 2,100 megawatts.

== Construction ==
In August 1952, the United States Atomic Energy Commission (AEC) selected Scioto Township, a rural area occupied by family-owned farms, as the site for a new gaseous diffusion plant to produce highly enriched uranium, uranium-235, for use in military reactors and nuclear weapons production. Located near the junction of the Scioto and Ohio rivers, the site was chosen due to the economic availability of electric energy, availability of water for plant operation, adequate potential labor, suitable transportation facilities, geographic traits, and relative flatness of the topography.

The project was given expedited priority. Due to this prioritization, construction of the site had to start before all the architectural drawings for the site were completed. The Oak Ridge, Tennessee, operations of the AEC set up an organization designated "The Portsmouth Area" to direct construction and operation of the plant, select engineers and construction contractors, schedule delivery of critical materials and any other contingency. Uniform agreements were set up between labor and management to minimize the number of stoppages. Early planning and organization took place in improvised offices in city buildings in Portsmouth, including the National Guard Armory, the Elks City Club and the old farmhouses on the site itself. Nine architect engineer firms shared in the design of the plant, producing 12,000 design drawings, 40,000 construction drawings and 16,000 shop drawings. Advanced planning and scheduling were extremely important because the plant was designed to go into operation – or "on stream" – as soon as each unit or segment in a process building was completed while construction continued in other parts of the building.

Groundbreaking for the plant was on November 18, 1952. Earthmovers began leveling the rolling farmland for the building foundations on the same day. One hundred thousand short tons (91,000 metric tons) of structural steel, 14,500 short tons (13,200 metric tons) of reinforcing steel in the concrete floors, 600 miles (970 kilometers) of process piping and 1,000 miles (1,600 kilometers) of copper tubing were used in the construction of the three process buildings. An additional 1,000 miles (1,600 kilometers) of tubing ran through the rest of the plant and into the control rooms. Five hundred thousand cubic yards (380,000 cubic meters) of concrete were required to complete the project. To support this, a separate concrete batching plant was constructed on plant site to serve all contractors; it produced 200 cubic yards (150 cubic meters) of concrete per hour. In total, it took 70 million man hours for construction.

Two railroad lines, financing their own work, built spurs into the area to haul in building materials and heavy equipment, including 22 miles (35 kilometers) of track on site. Twenty-five miles (40 kilometers) of roads were laid in the plant area, as well as a seven-mile (11-kilometer) perimeter road that encircles the plant.

The original estimate for construction was four years at a cost of $1.2 billion. Construction was carried out by Peter Kiewit and Sons of Nebraska at a cost of $750 million. The site was completed several months ahead of schedule at 34% below the original cost estimate at a $400 million savings.

== Operation ==
Operations at the Portsmouth plant began in 1954 while construction was ongoing, with the plant coming fully online in early 1956 – several months ahead of schedule.

The primary mode of enrichment was the gaseous diffusion of uranium hexafluoride to separate the lighter fissile isotope, uranium-235 (U-235), from the heavier non-fissile isotope, uranium-238. The plant initially produced highly enriched uranium for the U.S. nuclear weapons program, but in the mid-1960s, the plant converted to low-enriched uranium fuel production for commercial nuclear power plants, where it took material from the Paducah Plant that had been enriched to 2.75% U-235 and further enriched it to approximately 4–5% for use in commercial nuclear power plants.

The plant had a capacity of 8.3 million separative work units per year (SWU/year) in 1984 in 4,080 stages. Three buildings – X-326, X-330 and X-333 – housed gaseous diffusion equipment, and three cooling tower complexes – X-626, X-630 and X-633 – were used to remove process heat. Six hundred eighty-nine million U.S. gallons (2,610 million liters) of water went through the 11 cooling towers daily, of which 20 million U.S. gallons (76 million liters) evaporated into the air. Water came from well fields installed at the Scioto River, supplying 40 million gallons per day when operating at full capacity.

To support operations, the AEC entered into a contract to become the largest single consumer/customer in the history of the electrical utility industry at that time. The plant set new records for single customer site usage with 18 billion kilowatt-hours annually, and demand peaking at more than 2,000 megawatts. The two largest private power plants in the world up to that time were built to supply the facility, one at Clifty Creek in Madison, Indiana, and another at Kyger Creek in Gallipolis, Ohio. They were also the most efficient coal-fired power plants in the world, producing one kilowatt-hour of electricity for every 0.7 pounds (0.32 kilograms) of coal. The power plants used 7.5 million short tons (6.8 million metric tons) of coal annually to support operations.

United States Enrichment Corporation (USEC, now Centrus) ceased gaseous enrichment operations at the Portsmouth plant in May 2001 after it consolidated operations at the Paducah plant in Kentucky. The following year, transfer and shipping operations were also consolidated in Paducah. Although USEC had nine years' time and had received the funding, it ceased the Portsmouth enrichment cascade in a dirty power-down, without purging the diffusion cells. Geoffrey Sea wrote in September 2013 that USEC's demise will be either by creditors (by the October 2014 loan repayment deadline), "regulators who find their spines" or by "repeal of the USEC Privatization Act by Congress".

Workers at the plant were represented by the Oil, Chemical and Atomic Workers International Union (OCAW).

== Plant operator ==
The plant was operated by the Goodyear Tire and Rubber Company from its startup until 1986, when the contract was taken over by Martin Marietta. In 1993, USEC took overall responsibility for the Paducah and Portsmouth enrichment plants, continuing the operating contract with Martin Marietta. In 1995, the operator became Lockheed Martin with the merger between it and Martin Marietta. In May 2001, the plant ceased gaseous diffusion enrichment operations and was placed in cold standby. In 2006, the site work shifted into cold shutdown transition in preparation for future decontamination and decommissioning (D&D). In 2011, after 10 years of maintaining the enrichment facilities in a safe shutdown condition and providing general sitewide services, USEC returned the gaseous diffusion plant facilities to the U.S. Department of Energy for decontamination and decommissioning.

== Depleted uranium conversion (DUF6) ==
Depleted uranium – uranium material with a reduced percentage of the fissile isotope U-235 following processing in the form of depleted uranium hexafluoride (DUF6) – remains on site for continuing processing. The DUF6 Conversion facilities are located at both the Portsmouth Gaseous Diffusion Plant and the Paducah Gaseous Diffusion Plant. Each facility consists of four buildings – a conversion building, an administration building, a warehouse and a potassium hydroxide (KOH) regeneration building – as well as rail heads, five large acid storage tanks and lay-down areas for DUF6 steel cylinders. In 2002, DOE awarded Uranium Disposition Services, LLC (UDS) a contract to design, build and operate the DUF6 conversion plants to convert the DUF6 to uranium oxide and hydrofluoric acid. In December 2010, the DOE awarded Babcock & Wilcox Conversion Services LLC (BWCS) a contract to operate the DUF6 Conversion Plants through March 2016; it completed the transition of the contract for initial operations of the DUF6 Project in March 2011. Both plants were expected to be fully operational in fall 2011. As of June 2022, Mid-America Conversion Services is the operator of the facility.

== Centrifuge separation enrichment ==
Enrichment of isotopes of several elements was pursued using gas centrifuge technology prior to World War II. The DOE originally began developing gas centrifuge technology for mass production uranium enrichment in the early 1960s.

=== DOE Gas Centrifuge Enrichment Plant ===
During the early 1980s, the DOE had begun construction of a centrifuge enrichment plant known as the DOE Gas Centrifuge Enrichment Plant (GCEP) at the Portsmouth site before abandoning the project in June 1985 after spending $3 billion. The major buildings constructed for the GCEP were left in place after the project cancellation.

=== American Centrifuge Lead Cascade Facility ===
USEC began working with the DOE in 2000 to resume gas centrifuge enrichment operation activities at the Portsmouth site, including use of previously constructed portions of the plant and the former GCEP facilities. USEC sited its Lead Cascade Test Program on the Portsmouth site in late 2002. The Nuclear Regulatory Commission (NRC) granted Materials License SNM-7003 this demonstration facility, known as the American Centrifuge Lead Cascade Facility, in 2004. The license permitted to facility to possess up to 250 kilograms of uranium hexafluoride (UF_{6}) and consist of up to 240 operating, full-scale centrifuge machines arranged in a cascade configuration. Lead Cascade operations using prototype machines commenced in August 2007 at the facilities located southwest of the gaseous diffusion process buildings. The Lead Cascade facilities included the X-3001 (PB1) Process Building, which housed the operating centrifuge machines, associated process piping, instrumentation and controls, computer systems and auxiliary support equipment. The X-3001 building – and the identical X-3002 building immediately east of it – was developed as part of the GCEP program. X-3001 is a single-story building with 87-foot-high ceilings and comprises four 630 x 104 feet bays, each of which is equipped with an overhead traveling crane. The prototype centrifuges, facility and equipment were used for development and testing; other than minimal chemical samples, no enriched UF_{6} was withdrawn from the cascade.

=== American Centrifuge Plant ===
In a closely following regulatory action, on August 23, 2004, USEC applied for a license to construct and operate the larger, commercial-scale American Centrifuge Plant in the same complex of structures as the Lead Cascade, plus some new construction. The NRC issued Special Nuclear Materials License SNM-2011 on Docket 70-7004 to USEC to construct and operate the proposed plant at the Portsmouth site in April 2007, and construction began the next month. In July 2009, the DOE did not grant a $2 billion loan guarantee for the planned uranium-enrichment facility in Piketon, "causing the initiative to go into financial meltdown", USEC spokesperson Elizabeth Stuckle said, adding, "We are now forced to initiate steps to demobilize the project." On July 28, 2009, the company said was suspending work on the project because of the DOE's decision not to provide loan guarantees. The DOE said the proposed plant was not ready for commercial production and therefore ineligible for the loan guarantees. The department said at the time that if USEC withdraws its application, it would receive $45 million over the next 18 months to conduct further research and development of the centrifuge technology, which the DOE viewed as promising. The 2009 decisions by DOE and USEC effectively ended the commercial scale American Centrifuge Plant project as envisioned in that timeframe.

In March 2010, USEC began operating a new test cascade of U.S.-designed and fabricated, commercial-ready AC-100 centrifuge machines at the American Centrifuge Lead Cascade Facility. This demonstration, sometimes referred to as the American Centrifuge Project, was then terminated in 2015 by the Obama Administration. Centrus ceased enrichment development operations at the Portsmouth site and began decontamination and decommissioning work at the facility, including removal of the centrifuges and process piping. On August 9, 2018, facility licensee and Centrus subsidiary American Centrifuge Operating LLC (ACO) requested the termination of the American Centrifuge Lead Cascade Facility NRC Materials License SNM-7003.

On January 7, 2019, U.S. Senator Rob Portman announced that the Trump administration had earmarked $115 million to open the Centrus centrifuge facility again, employing 60 people. The facility would house a cascade of 16 centrifuges for uranium enrichment, subject to EPA final approval. In June 2019, Centrus reversed course on their previous request for termination of the American Centrifuge Lead Cascade Facility NRC Material license SNM-7003, and by letter withdrew the termination request from NRC consideration; the NRC had not rendered a decision on the August 2018 termination request at the time of the June 2019 request withdraw.

On October 31, 2019, ACO signed a three-year contract with the DOE (HALEU Demonstration Contract Number 89303519CNE000005) to deploy a cascade of centrifuges to demonstrate production of high-assay, low-enriched uranium (HALEU). The intended use of this HALEU is as fuel for future advanced reactors, which require this higher – but still far below weapons-grade – enrichment. Under the contract, described as the HALEU Demonstration Program, ACO is to deploy 16 AC-100M centrifuges in a cascade to produce HALEU at 19.75% uranium-235 enrichment. This demonstration is of importance to U.S. national security; as of the early 2020s, the U.S. does not have operable U.S.-origin uranium enrichment technology. Centrus requested an amendment to the existing NRC Materials license SNM-2011 for their American Centrifuge Plant to be able to possess the planned HALEU material in April 2020. As of early 2021, publicly described plans are for licensing approval to be received and the improved AC-100M machines to be installed by the end of 2021. After the ACP license SNM-2011 is amended to possess the HALEU material, the licensee programs and NRC oversight conducted under the Lead Cascade license SNM-7003 will be transferred to ACP license SNM-2011 and SNM-7003 terminated. On June 11, 2021, the NRC issued the revised license to Centrus for approval to operate 16 centrifuges to demonstrate production of HALEU until May 31, 2022.

== Decontamination & decommissioning, and ongoing cleanup ==
During its nearly 60 years of operation, the cleaning, maintenance and change-out of process equipment at the site generated radionuclide contamination, spent solvents and other chemical contaminants that were disposed of in onsite landfills and surface storage buildings. To date, contamination has been found in various locations on site including the process buildings, the former cooling towers, landfills, wastewater ponds and other buildings. There are also groundwater plumes from the landfills. A total of 415 individual buildings, sites and features have been identified for cleanup. The Ohio EPA is monitoring cleanup operations, pursuant to a 1989 consent decree.

Former Assistant Secretary for the DOE Office of Environmental Management, Anne White, said in a local news interview in 2025 that the radioactive waste landfill should never have been built in the east because the region where it is gets four feet of rain per year, and there is groundwater movement very near the surface. Further, a leak into the Teays aquifer would contaminate the ancient aquifer which reaches from Virginia to Indiana.

On June 27, 2005, the DOE awarded a contract to LATA/Parallax Portsmouth LLC (LPP), the first small-business contract by the DOE at the Portsmouth site. As part of the environmental remediation of the site, LPP removed 31 facilities, including an 18-acre switchyard complex that included 160 towers, 18 large transformers, 10 synchronous condensers, two switch houses, one two-story control room and numerous other structures. LPP's contract was extended as part of the American Recovery and Reinvestment Act of 2009 (ARRA) stimulus project, with their contract ending on March 29, 2011.

In 2008, a large project was completed to remove 7,640 short tons (6,930 metric tons) of scrap material by shearing and disposing of 382 old process equipment converter shells. Between 2003 and 2010, more than 2.10 million cubic feet (59,500 cubic meters) of legacy waste was removed from the site.

In September 2010, the DOE awarded the $1.2 billion follow-up contract to Fluor-B&W Portsmouth LLC, which continues to serve as the prime D&D contractor as of the early 2020s.

== Nuclear power ==
No nuclear reactors ever operated at the Portsmouth site. The site was evaluated for a potential nuclear power plant by a consortium that included Areva, Duke Energy, USEC and UniStar Nuclear Energy as part of the DOE Next Generation Nuclear Plant Project. That project concluded in the early 2010s without any action for the Portsmouth site.

== Future of the site ==
In a multi-year effort in the 2010s, the DOE worked with stakeholders to understand the community’s future use vision for the Portsmouth site after cleanup is complete. With the assistance of the PORTSfuture Project and interaction with the Southern Ohio Diversification Initiative (SODI), the Portsmouth Site Specific Advisory Board, elected officials, economic development professionals and others, the community has expressed a consensus vision to reindustrialize appropriate portions of the Portsmouth site property. Economic development and local job creation dominated local residents' desires for the site.

SODI was designated by DOE to be the Community Reuse Organization for the Portsmouth site in 1995. SODI serves Pike, Ross, Scioto and Jackson counties with a clear mission through economic diversification, development, asset transition and business development. In 2018, the first parcel of land at the site was transferred to SODI, and additional land is being studied for further transfers. Through an agreement with SODI, the DOE is able to transfer eligible property to SODI that can be reused, sold or recycled for the benefit of economic development in the four-county region surrounding the plant.

The site benefits from having existing infrastructure (electrical switchyards, water supply, etc.), which was designed for a massive industrial facility, encouraging re-use by a wide variety of industries or other uses.

On April 28, 2020, the DOE announced that a team led by SODI had been selected to receive $4,956,589 in cost-shared funding for a project titled Generic Design Support Activities for Advanced Reactors. Per the DOE announcement, the team is to "initiate characterization, permitting, and decontamination and decommissioning studies to support potential advanced reactor deployment at the Portsmouth, Ohio Site. This work includes the development of an early site permit template that will envelope a broad range of advanced reactor technologies, potentially supporting the DOE goal of demonstrating an advanced reactor by the late 2020s." The SODI team includes the Electric Power Research Institute (EPRI), Southern Nuclear Development LLC, Orano Federal Services, Orano Decommissioning Services, and the Idaho National Laboratory operated by Battelle Energy Alliance. Notably, the project does not seek to identify, approve, license or construct any facility at the site, but to prepare information that might be useful to future decision makers.

== May 2019 school radionuclide survey event ==
A DOE air monitor adjacent to Zahn's Corner Middle School – which is located in Piketon, Ohio, just two miles (3.2 kilometers) from the plant – detected airborne Neptunium-237 and Americium-241 in 2017 and 2018, respectively. These detections were reported in the 2017 and 2018 Annual Site Environmental Reports.

On May 13, 2019, a report by Dr. Michael Ketterer of Northern Arizona University indicated the presence of enriched uranium and transuranic radionuclides within the school, resulting in the Scioto Valley Local School District Board choosing to close the school for the rest of the 2018–2019 school year. Area businesses, homes, ground and groundwater were also undergoing further testing at the time.

A team of certified health physicists from the DOE’s National Laboratories and the National Nuclear Security Administration conducted an investigation at the school, accompanied by representatives of the Ohio Department of Health and interested members of the Piketon community. The team of radiation safety experts collected 44 surface samples over the 2019 Memorial Day weekend, including specific areas requested by the community to be tested, such as above ceiling tiles. Air samples also were collected from both inside and outside the school. Samples from the areas cited by the report from Dr. Ketterer were taken and provided to local and state officials for their independent analysis, in addition to the sample swipes to be analyzed by the DOE. As reported by the DOE, "Results from sample analyses conducted by experts at Savannah River National Laboratory show no radioactivity detected above naturally occurring levels, and no cause for public health concern."

This event has resulted in a class-action lawsuit that was filed on behalf of area residents by a group of attorneys led by toxic tort specialist Stuart Smith.

The school remained closed as of the 2020–2021 school year.

== See also ==
- National Enrichment Facility
- Nuclear fuel cycle
- Nuclear power
- Paducah Gaseous Diffusion Plant
- Privatization
- United States Enrichment Corporation

== Sources ==
- Oak Ridge National Laboratory Gas Centrifuge Demonstration Program
- Global Security.org: Weapons of Mass Destruction-Gas Centrifuge Uranium Enrichment
- USEC Facilities: Portsmouth Gaseous Diffusion Plant
