= Paducah Gaseous Diffusion Plant =

Decommissioned uranium enrichment facility

Coordinates: 37°06′50″N 88°48′37″W

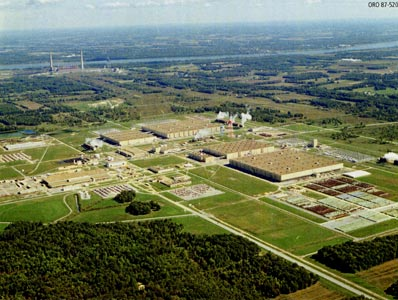
An aerial view of the Paducah Gaseous Diffusion Plant.

The Paducah Gaseous Diffusion Plant (PGDP) is a facility located in McCracken County, Kentucky, near Paducah, Kentucky that produced enriched uranium from 1952 to 2013. It is owned by the United States Department of Energy (DOE). The PGDP was the only operating uranium enrichment facility in the United States from 2001 to 2010. The Paducah plant produced low-enriched uranium, originally as feedstock for military reactors and weapons, and later as fuel for commercial nuclear power plants.

The plant covers 750 acres (300 ha) of a 3,556-acre (1,439 ha) site. The four process buildings cover 74 acres (30 ha), and consumed a peak electrical demand of 3,040 megawatts.

In January 2026, the company leasing the facility, General Matter, received a $900 million contract from the DOE for it to produce High-Assay Low-Enriched Uranium (HALEU) for the next generation of US reactors.

== History ==
The former Kentucky Ordinance Works site was chosen from a candidate list of eight sites in 1950. The construction contractor was F.H. McGraw of Hartford, Connecticut and the operating company was Union Carbide. The plant was opened in 1952 as a government-owned, contractor-operated facility producing enriched uranium to fuel military reactors and for use in nuclear weapons. The mode of enrichment was gaseous diffusion of uranium hexafluoride to separate the lighter fissile isotope U-235 from the heavier non-fissile isotope U-238.

The Paducah plant produced low-enriched uranium which was further refined at the Portsmouth Gaseous Diffusion Plant in Ohio and the K-25 plant at Oak Ridge, Tennessee. From the 1960s the Paducah plant was dedicated to uranium enrichment for nuclear power plants. In 1984, the operating contract was assumed by Martin Marietta Energy Systems. Lockheed Martin operated the plant until USEC leased the facility in the mid-1990s.

The Paducah plant had a capacity of 11.3 million separative work units per year (SWU/year) in 1984. 1812 stages were located in five buildings: C-310 with 60 stages, C-331 with 400 stages, C-333 with 480 stages, C-335 with 400 stages and C-337 with 472 stages.

Before cessation of uranium enrichment on 31 May 2013, the Paducah facility consumed about 3,000 megawatts of electricity. Power for the Paducah gaseous diffusion plant came from the Tennessee Valley Authority (TVA).

DOE leased the facility to a publicly held company, USEC, from the mid-1990s. USEC ceased operations in 2013 and returned the facility to the DOE for decontamination and decommissioning.

In August 2025, General Matter, an American uranium enrichment company, signed a lease with the U.S. Department of Energy (DOE) for the former Paducah Gaseous Diffusion Plant. Plans for the $1.5 billion updated facility include uranium enrichment technology for the production of fuel needed for the next generation of nuclear energy. In January 2026, General Matter received a $900 million contract from the U.S. Department of Energy for reshoring to produce American enriched uranium.

== Employment and economic impact ==
During enrichment operations approximately 1200 people were needed to operate the plant. Since cessation of enrichment activities the site employs around 1400 people through contractors to maintain the grounds, portions of the infrastructure, deactivate, optimize utilities and to remediate environmental contamination at the site. The facility has had a positive economic impact on the local economy and continues to be an economic driver for the community. Workers at the plant were represented by the Oil, Chemical and Atomic Workers International Union (OCAW).

== Contamination ==
Plant operations have contaminated the site over time. The primary contamination of concern is trichloroethylene (TCE), which was a commonly used degreaser at the site. TCE leaked and contaminated groundwater on and off the site. The groundwater is also contaminated with trace amounts of technetium-99, a radioactive fission product; Other site contaminants include polychlorinated biphenyl (PCBs). Through normal operations, portions of the plant, primarily process equipment, are contaminated with uranium.

In 1988, TCE and trace amounts of technetium-99 were found in the drinking water wells of residences located near the plant site in McCracken County, Kentucky. To protect human health, the Department of Energy provided city water at no cost to the affected residents, and continues to do so.

== Lawsuits ==
In the 1980s, the family of former employee Joe Harding brought a lawsuit relating to medical conditions that they believed he incurred from having worked at the Paducah plant. His widow Clara Harding eventually settled the suit for $12,000. A class action lawsuit was brought against the Lockheed Martin in 1999 for former and current employees who believed that they had suffered significant medical expenses because of exposure to ionizing radiation at the plant. The suit was dismissed in 2003 because a judge ruled that the plant was covered by the Price-Anderson Act.

In 1998 a lawsuit was brought by employees of the plant against Lockheed Martin relating to the falsifying of contamination reports. The United States government partially joined the suit in 2003. In 2016, Lockheed Martin agreed to pay the government $5 million in a settlement of the allegations that it had violated the Resource Conservation and Recovery Act and knowingly submitted false claims for payment. The government gave $920,000 of the settlement to whistleblowers.

== Cleanup status ==
The Department of Energy continues to remediate groundwater contamination. Significant progress has been made in reducing concentrations of TCE in the groundwater by using pump and treat as well as electrical resistance heating. Twenty five out of over 500 inactive facilities at the site have been demolished. Other site facilities are being deactivated and prepared for demolition. In 2019, $314 million was allocated towards the cleanup through an act of legislation.

One of the largest known refrigeration systems in the world was on site until a safe removal operation began in 2020. It held 3,856 tonnes of R-114, an ozone-depleting CFC. This has an enormous equivalent global warming potential of 38.56 million tonnes of CO_{2}. This amount is equivalent to about half the allowance for all fluorinated gases in the entire European Union in 2023.

== See also ==
- K-25
- Portsmouth Gaseous Diffusion Plant
- United States Enrichment Corporation

== Sources ==
- Bischak, Greg (1989). "Facing the Second Generation of the Nuclear Weapons Complex: Renewal of the Nuclear Production Base or Economic Conversion?". In Dumas, Lloyd J.; Thee, Marek (eds.). Making Peace Possible: The Promise of Economic Conversion. Peace Research Monograph. Vol. 19. Oxford: Pergamon Press. ISBN 0-08-037252X. OCLC 18909348.
- Cochran, Thomas B.; Arkin, William M.; Norris, Robert S.; Hoening, Milton M. (1987). Nuclear Weapons Databook. Vol. III: U.S. Nuclear Warhead Facility Profiles. Cambridge, Massachusetts: Ballinger Publishing. ISBN 0-88730-146-0. OCLC 9112133.
