= Los Alamos Technical Associates =

Los Alamos Technical Associates, Inc.
- Company type: Private company
- Industry: Environmental Engineering
- Founded: December 26, 1975; 50 years ago in Los Alamos, New Mexico, U.S.
- Headquarters: Albuquerque, New Mexico, U.S.
- Key people: Robin Beard, CEO/President
- Number of employees: Less than 500
- Website: www.lata.com

Los Alamos Technical Associates (LATA) is an SBA certified Woman-Owned Small Business (WOSB) diversified in engineering, scientific, and technical services company serving a worldwide client base. Founded in 1975 in Los Alamos, New Mexico, LATA has offices nationwide with corporate offices in Albuquerque, New Mexico. Their work is in four primary service areas: nuclear, environmental, demolition, defense and security, and engineering.

== Notable Contracts ==
In February 2003, Los Alamos National Laboratory signed a contract with KSL Services Joint Venture where LATA was one of the three companies.

In January 2005, the Department of Energy announced a signing between LATA and Parallax Inc for a $141 million contract.

== Locations ==
They currently have offices located in:

- Los Alamos, NM
- Albuquerque, NM (HQ)
- Richland, WA
- Columbus, OH
- Amarillo, TX
- Oak Ridge, TN
- Wixom, MI
- Carlsbad, NM
