= Piketon Mounds =

Archaeological site in Ohio, United States

- U.S. National Register of Historic Places
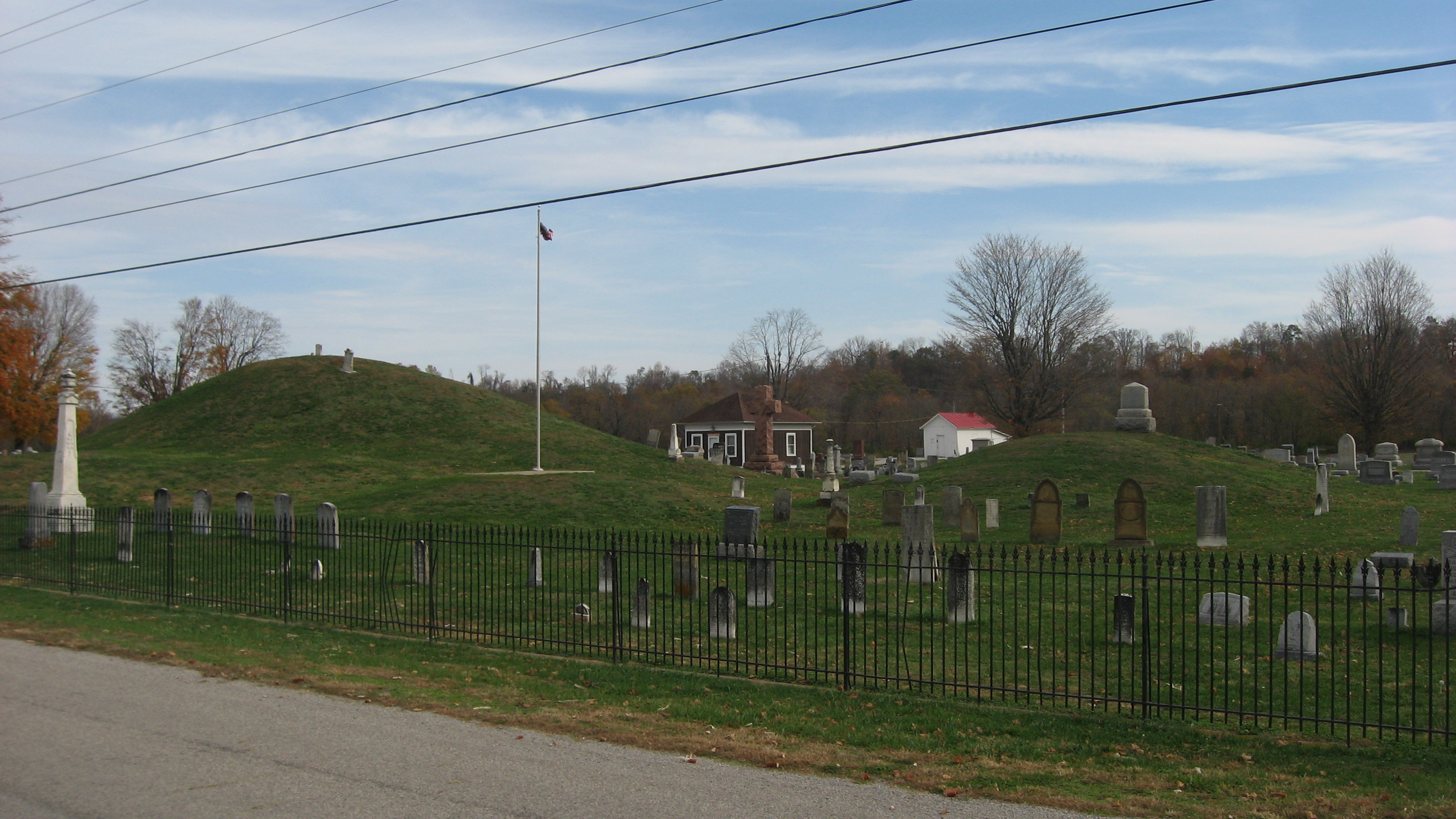
- Overview from southwest

- Location within Ohio Location within the United States
- Location: Mound Cemetery, south of Piketon
- Nearest city: Piketon, Ohio
- Coordinates: 39°3′4″N 83°1′10″W
- Area: 3 acres (1.2 ha)
- NRHP reference No.: 74001599
- Added to NRHP: May 2, 1974

The Piketon Mounds (also called Graded Way) are a group of earthworks located in Piketon, Ohio in the United States. The site is listed on the National Register of Historic Places. The specific age of the site is unknown. Some mounds were created by the Adena culture, while other mounds were built by the Hopewell culture.

== Location ==
The site is located in Piketon, Ohio. As of 1848, the Chillicothe Turnpike traveled through the site and a cemetery was built upon the remains of a collection of mounds. The cemetery, named Mound Cemetery, as pictured to the right, remains in place today.

== Survey history ==
=== Squier and Davis: 1840s ===
The site was featured in the 1848 publication, Ancient Monuments of the Mississippi Valley by Ephraim George Squier and Edwin Hamilton Davis. The two men visited the site. They call the side the Graded Way. They describe the graded way as being a type of earthwork seen "at various points at the West," including at earthworks in Richmond Dale, Ohio and an additional site in Piketon. They also suggest that they are similar to earthworks found in Mexico. They state that grading ways are often seen "ascending sometimes from one terrace to another, and occasionally descending towards the banks of rivers or water-courses."

The graded way is noted as being 1,080 feet long, 215 feet wide in one section and 203 feet wide in another. They describe the site as having a graded ascent from a second terrace to a third terrace. The third terrace is 17 feet above the second. Various embankments were seen throughout the earthwork, ranging from 5 to eleven feet in height. At the 203 foot wide section of the grade, "the walls upon the interior sides measure no less than twenty-two feet in perpendicular height." As of 1848, trees and bushes were covering the works, and Squier and Davis suggest that passerby would most likely see the site as just hills, not a man-made installation.

A small embankment extended off of the right side of the graded way totaling 2,580 feet long. As of 1848, much of it was destroyed by the Chillicothe Turnpike. A wall was built, 1500 feet from the grade. It was built at a right angle and travel 212 feet. At that point, the line followed parallel to the main grade for 420 feet. It then curved in towards the grade and ended at a site of four mounds - three small and one large. Squier and Davis note that the small mounds were a cemetery at their time of visitation, a cemetery which remains there today. The large mound totaled 30 feet high. There were other small mounds and no more major mounds in the vicinity. On the left side of the graded way leads to the second terrace, which ends to a low area in the ground which is often filled with water. Squier and Davis cite that in the past it is believed that the Scioto River had passed through the area near the terrace.

Based on their observations, Squier and Davis theorize about the use of the site as possibly a way to get from one terrace to the next. However, the embankments caused them to question that theory. In their report, they do not provide a set theory on what the site was used for.

=== Today ===
The site features four mounds which are located in a cemetery. Three of the mounds rise in size from two feet high to five feet high. The largest mound is 75 feet in diameter and 25 feet high. On previous excavations, one of the mounds was reported of housing a human skeleton of a girl wrapped in bark. The graded way remains, creating what the Ohio Historical Society describes as "a natural drainage channel,". The mounds are classic of Adena culture and the graded way is more known as being created by the Hopewell culture. This makes it hard to calculate a set date for the works.
