= Piketon, Ohio =

- Village
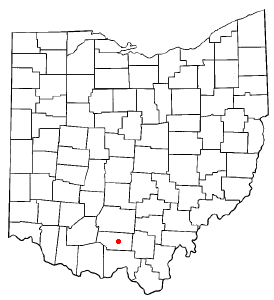
- Location of Piketon, Ohio

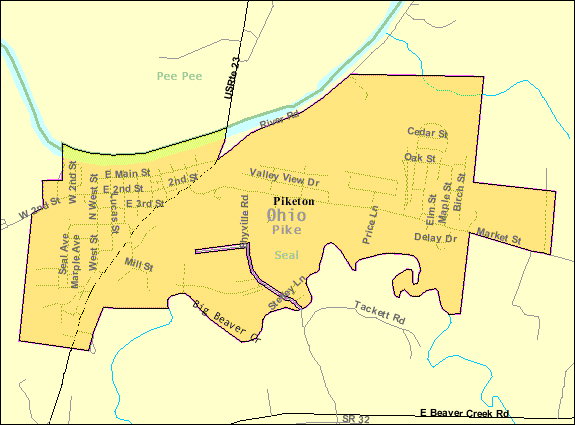
- Detailed map of Piketon
- Coordinates: 39°4′5″N 83°0′52″W
- Country: United States
- State: Ohio
- County: Pike

Area
  - Total: 2.57 sq mi (6.65 km^{2})
  - Land: 2.51 sq mi (6.51 km^{2})
  - Water: 0.054 sq mi (0.14 km^{2})
- Elevation: 581 ft (177 m)

Population (2020)
  - Total: 2,111
  - Density: 839.6/sq mi (324.17/km^{2})
- Time zone: UTC-5 (Eastern (EST))
  - Summer (DST): UTC-4 (EDT)
- ZIP code: 45661
- Area code: 740
- FIPS code: 39-62708
- Website: https://piketonohio.gov/

Piketon is a village in Pike County in the U.S. state of Ohio, along the Scioto River. The village is best known for the uranium enrichment plant located there, which is one of only three such plants in the United States. The population was 2,111 at the 2020 U.S. census.

== History ==
Originally called Jefferson, Piketon was the county seat of Pike County from 1815 to 1845, when James Emmitt, a wealthy local entrepreneur, influenced the transfer of the county seat to Waverly, due to its closer proximity to the then-new Ohio & Erie Canal. Piketon is the location of the Pike County Fairgrounds and is served by the Scioto Valley Local School District.

Perhaps the best-known historic resident of Piketon was Robert Lucas, the twelfth governor of Ohio and first territorial governor of Iowa. Around 1824, Lucas built a large brick house two miles east of Piketon, named Friendly Grove, which became a center of local political activity.

Piketon is served by the Western and Piketon branches of the Garnet A. Wilson Public Library.

== Geography ==
According to the United States Census Bureau, the village has a total area of 2.55 square miles (6.60 km^{2}), of which 2.50 square miles (6.47 km^{2}) is land and 0.05 square miles (0.13 km^{2}) is water.

Piketon is located along the Scioto river. The town and river sit within the large valley carved by the historic Teays River, and the town extends from the south bank of the river to the eastern border of the valley where the hills of the Allegheny Plateau rise, with the town extending slightly into some of the flatter portions of the plateau. The valley is filled with rich alluvial soil formed by the Teays River.

== Economy ==
The initial operation of the lead cascade of the American Centrifuge Demonstration Facility in Piketon, Ohio, in 2005 by Centrus Energy Corp. comprised the first publicly visible component of next-generation uranium enrichment technology in the United States that employed a gas centrifuge process rather than gaseous diffusion to produce enriched uranium. Piketon was expected to exhibit a growth economy during the early 21st century with the establishment of a full-size commercial uranium enrichment plant by 2012. Unfortunately, in September 2015, the Department of Energy halted the project. Ohio Senator Rob Portman said, "This news is a major blow to the Piketon community and southeast Ohio". On April 7, 2026, SB Energy announced plans to build the world's largest AI data center on the site of the uranium enrichment plant.

== Demographics ==
Historical population
Census	Pop.	Note	%±
1820	275		—
1830	271		−1.5%
1840	507		87.1%
1850	690		36.1%
1860	684		−0.9%
1870	638		−6.7%
1880	665		4.2%
1890	1,022		53.7%
1900	625		−38.8%
1910	668		6.9%
1920	664		−0.6%
1930	713		7.4%
1940	736		3.2%
1950	768		4.3%
1960	1,244		62.0%
1970	1,347		8.3%
1980	1,726		28.1%
1990	1,717		−0.5%
2000	1,907		11.1%
2010	2,181		14.4%
2020	2,111		−3.2%
U.S. Decennial Census

=== 2010 census ===
As of the census of 2010, there were 2,181 people, 820 households, and 517 families residing in the village. The population density was 872.4 inhabitants per square mile (336.8/km^{2}). There were 908 housing units at an average density of 363.2 per square mile (140.2/km^{2}). The racial makeup of the village was 97.3% White, 0.9% African American, 0.1% Native American, 0.2% Asian, and 1.5% from two or more races. Hispanic or Latino of any race were 0.3% of the population.

There were 820 households, of which 35.6% had children under the age of 18 living with them, 38.8% were married couples living together, 19.6% had a female householder with no husband present, 4.6% had a male householder with no wife present, and 37.0% were non-families. 31.5% of all households were made up of individuals, and 11.5% had someone living alone who was 65 years of age or older. The average household size was 2.41 and the average family size was 3.00.

The median age in the village was 38.2 years. 25.5% of residents were under the age of 18; 8% were between the ages of 18 and 24; 24.5% were from 25 to 44; 23.5% were from 45 to 64; and 18.6% were 65 years of age or older. The gender makeup of the village was 46.7% male and 53.3% female.

=== 2000 census ===
As of the census of 2000, there were 1,907 people, 693 households, and 469 families residing in the village. The population density was 955.6 inhabitants per square mile (369.0/km^{2}). There were 745 housing units at an average density of 373.3 per square mile (144.1/km^{2}). The racial makeup of the village was 96.22% White, 1.10% African American, 0.16% Native American, 0.26% Asian, 0.05% Pacific Islander, and 2.20% from two or more races. Hispanic or Latino of any race were 0.26% of the population.

There were 693 households, out of which 34.1% had children under the age of 18 living with them, 43.1% were married couples living together, 21.1% had a female householder with no husband present, and 32.2% were non-families. 28.0% of all households were made up of individuals, and 12.7% had someone living alone who was 65 years of age or older. The average household size was 2.41 and the average family size was 2.93.

In the village, the population was spread out, with 24.5% under the age of 18, 9.9% from 18 to 24, 25.6% from 25 to 44, 18.6% from 45 to 64, and 21.4% who were 65 years of age or older. The median age was 39 years. For every 100 females, there were 76.9 males. For every 100 females age 18 and over, there were 72.1 males.

The median income for a household in the village was $21,290, and the median income for a family was $23,846. Males had a median income of $31,618 versus $21,602 for females. The per capita income for the village was $11,599. About 28.5% of families and 30.3% of the population were below the poverty line, including 41.5% of those under age 18 and 24.1% of those age 65 or over.

== Education ==
Scioto Valley Local School District operates Piketon High School in the village.

Piketon has a public library, a branch of the Garnet A. Wilson Public Library of Pike County.

== Culture ==
The Pike County Dogwood Festival is hosted annually in Piketon on the last full weekend in April. The festival was started in 1971, and features local foods, crafts, live bluegrass music and a parade, including a performance by the Piketon High School marching band. Several other exhibits from various local groups are also hosted in the Piketon Jasper United Methodist Church, including the Pike County Historical Society, the Pike County Quilters, Appalachian Kitchen, and artworks by local students.

== In popular culture ==
Piketon is briefly shown in the 2013 American action film, White House Down, directed by Roland Emmerich. Towards the climax of the film, there is a scene in which terrorists hack into NORAD and launch a missile at Air Force One from the Portsmouth Gaseous Diffusion Plant located in Piketon, killing everyone on board.

== Notable people ==
- Robert Lucas, twelfth governor of Ohio and first territorial governor of Iowa

== Gallery ==
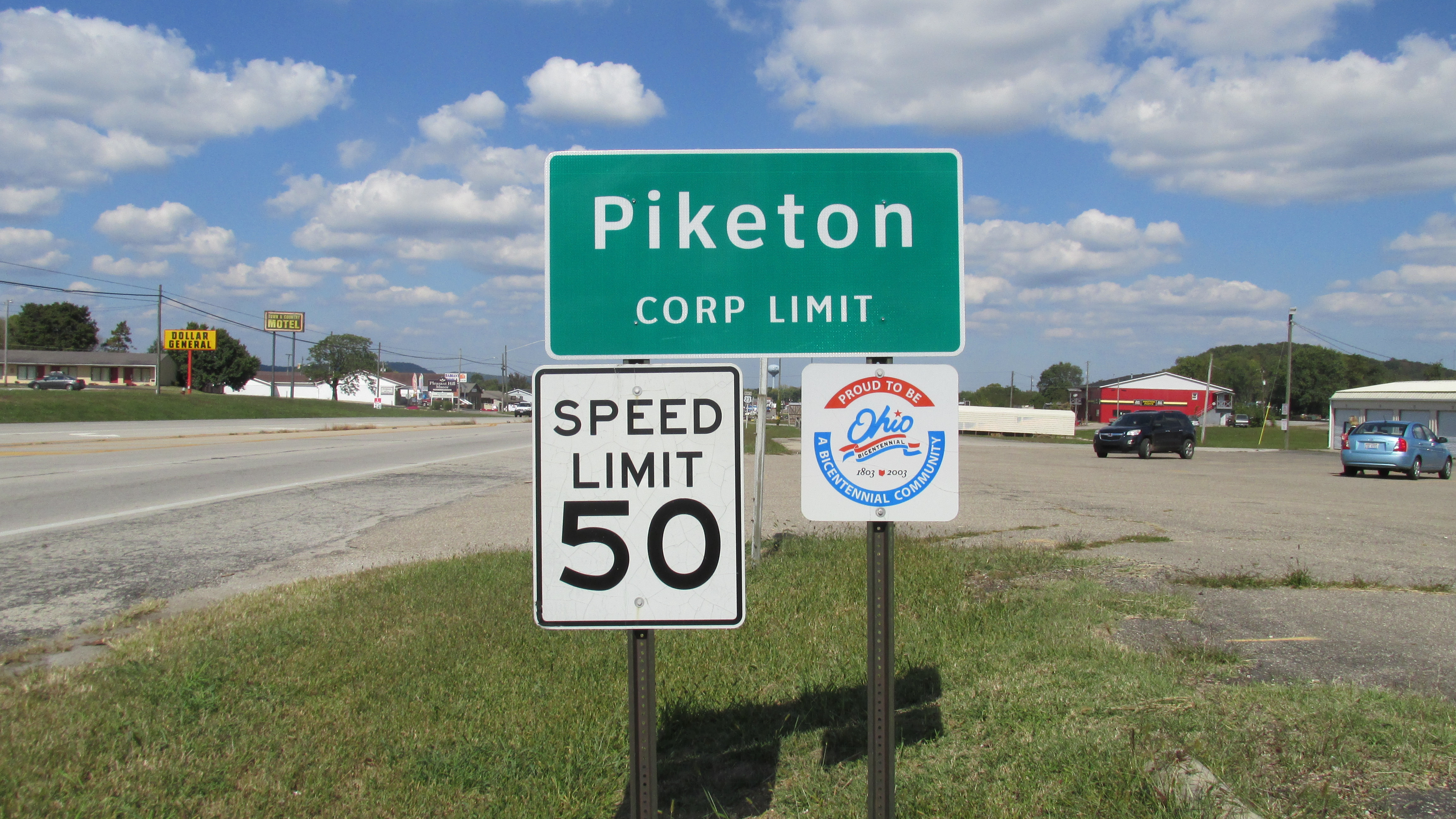
Piketon corporation limit sign.

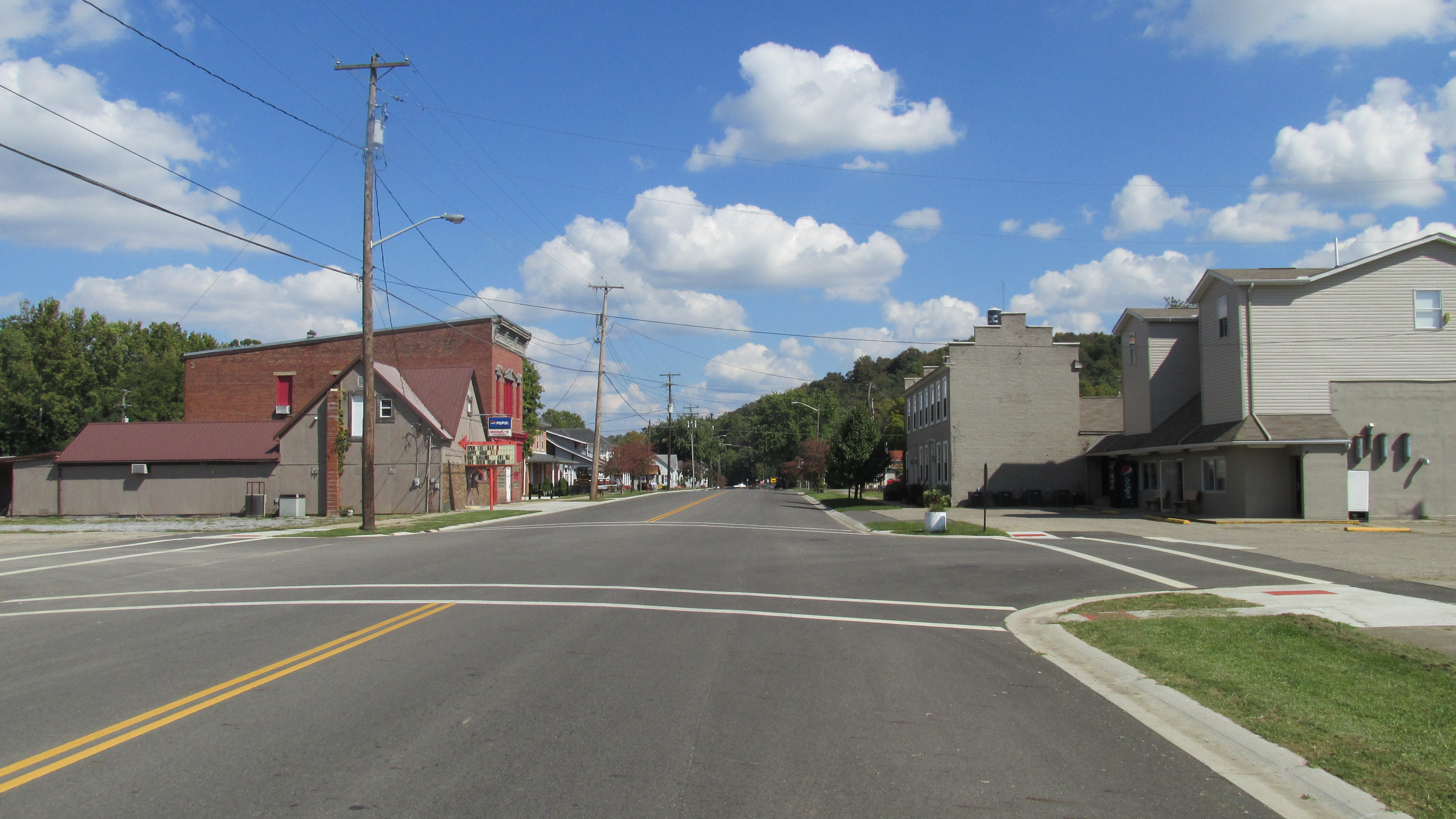
Looking east on Main Street in Piketon.

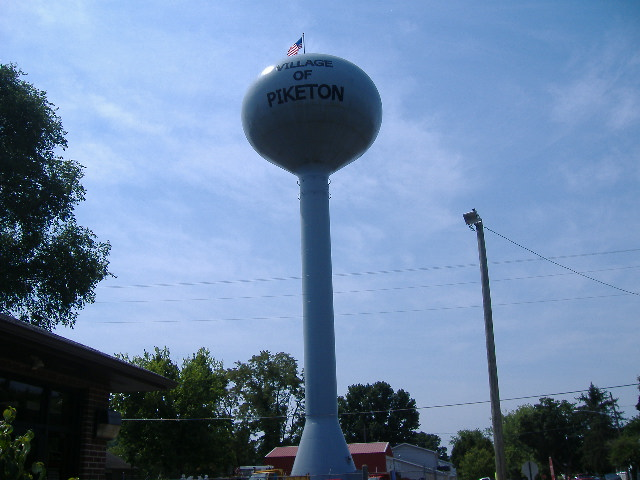
Water tower in Piketon, Ohio.

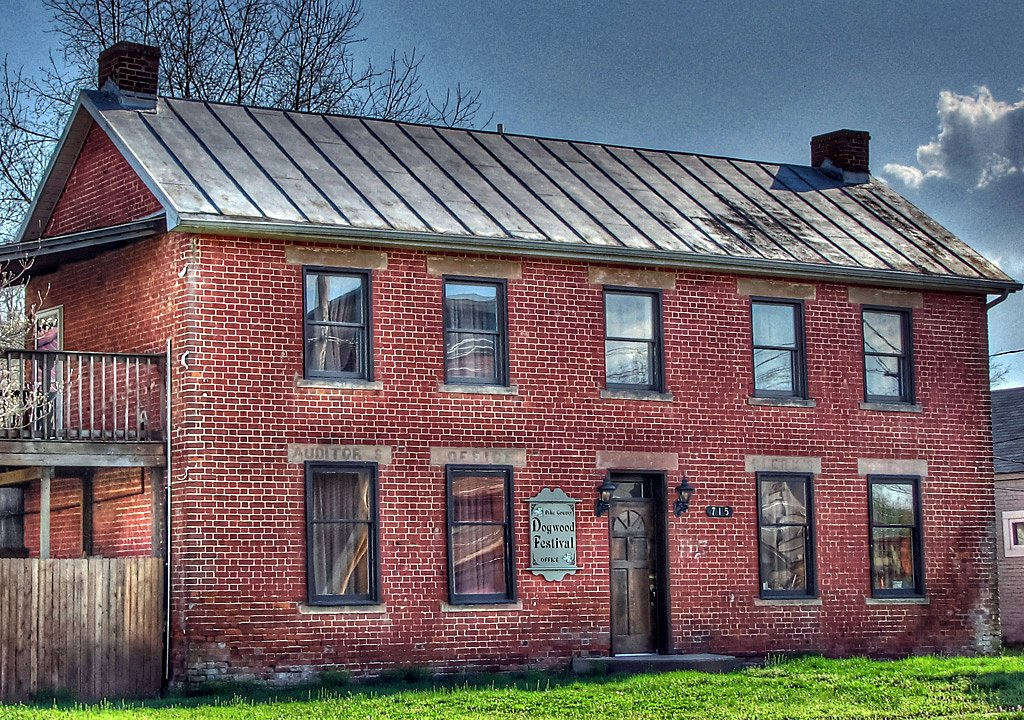
Old Court House, completed in 1819.

== See also ==
- Piketon Mounds
- Pike County, Ohio, shootings
- Portsmouth Gaseous Diffusion Plant
