= Anti-nuclear movement in France =

Movement opposing nuclear power in France

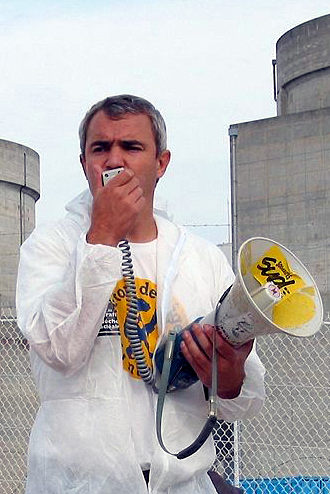
Stéphane Lhomme in front of Blayais Nuclear Power Plant.

In the 1970s, an anti-nuclear movement in France, consisting of citizens' groups and political action committees, emerged. Between 1975 and 1977, some 175,000 people protested against nuclear power in ten demonstrations.

In 1972, the anti-nuclear weapons movement maintained a presence in the Pacific, largely in response to French nuclear testing there. Activists, including David McTaggart from Greenpeace, defied the French government by sailing small vessels into the test zone and interrupting the testing program. In Australia, scientists issued statements demanding an end to the tests; unions refused to load French ships, service French planes, or carry French mail; and consumers boycotted French products. In 1985 the Greenpeace ship Rainbow Warrior was bombed and sunk by the French DGSE in Auckland, New Zealand, as it prepared for another protest of nuclear testing in French military zones. One crew member, Fernando Pereira of Portugal, photographer, drowned on the sinking ship.

In January 2004, up to 15,000 anti-nuclear protesters marched in Paris against a new generation of nuclear reactors, the European Pressurised Reactor (EPR). On March 17, 2007, simultaneous protests, organised by Sortir du nucléaire, were staged in 5 French towns to protest construction of EPR plants.

After Japan's 2011 Fukushima nuclear disaster, thousands staged anti-nuclear protests around France, demanding reactors be closed. Protesters' demands were focused on getting France to shut its oldest nuclear power station at Fessenheim. Many people also protested at the Cattenom Nuclear Power Plant, France's second most powerful. In November 2011, thousands of anti-nuclear protesters delayed a train carrying radioactive waste from France to Germany. Many clashes and obstructions made the journey the slowest one since the annual shipments of radioactive waste began in 1995. Also in November 2011, a French court fined nuclear power company Électricité de France €1.5m and jailed two senior employees for spying on Greenpeace, including hacking into Greenpeace's computer systems. The sentence was overturned by an appeals court in February 2013.

In March 2014, police arrested 57 Greenpeace protesters who used a truck to break through security barriers and enter the Fessenheim nuclear power plant in eastern France. The activists hung antinuclear banners, but France's nuclear safety authority said that the plant's security had not been compromised. President Hollande has promised to close Fessenheim by 2016, but Greenpeace wants immediate closure.

== History ==
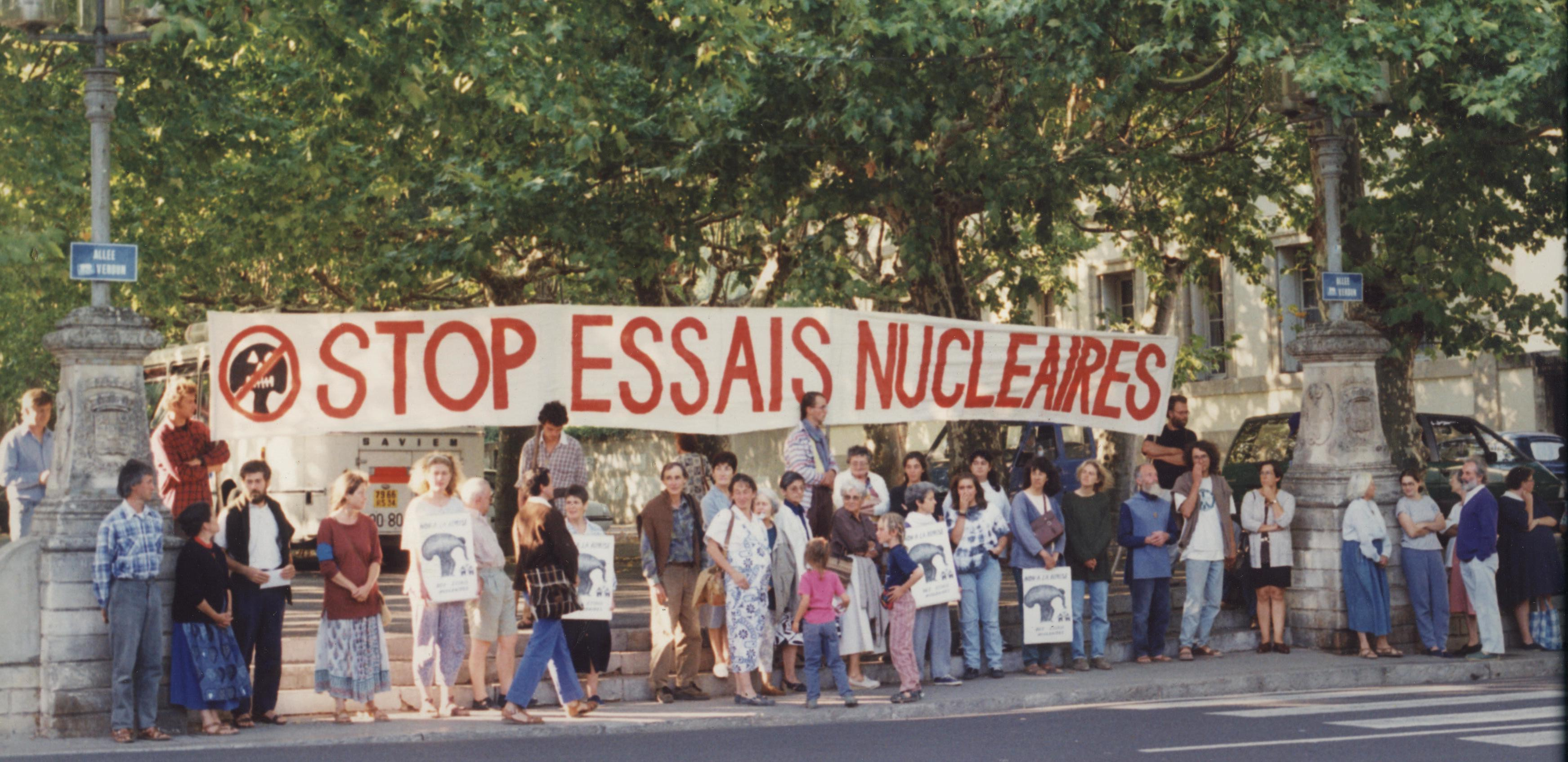
Demonstration against nuclear tests in Lyon, France, in the 1980s.

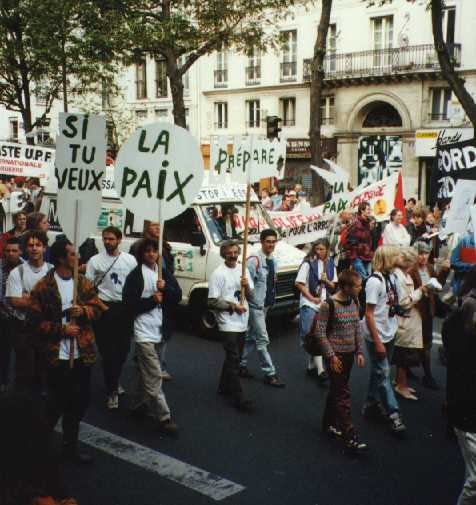
Demonstration against French nuclear tests in 1995 in Paris.

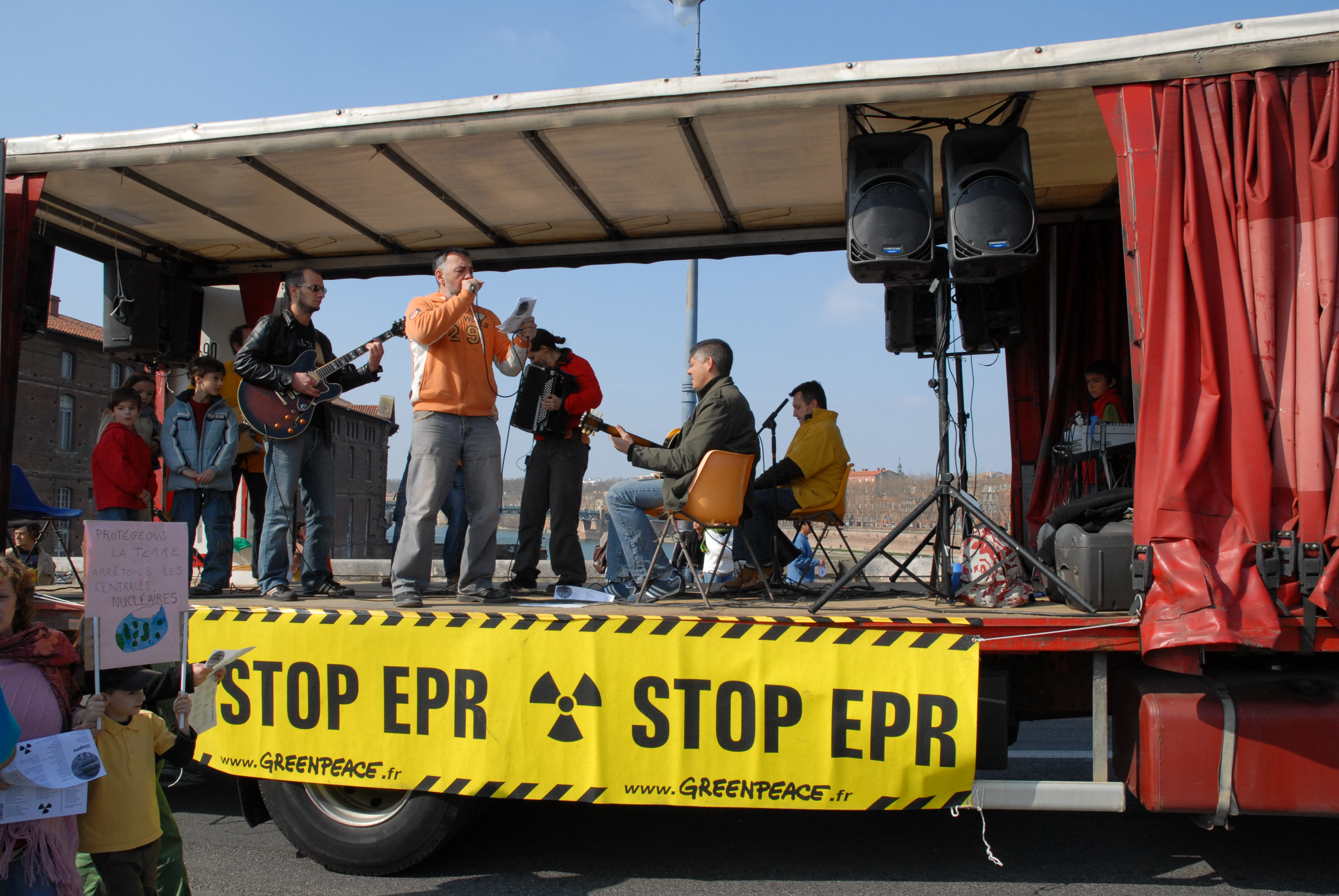
A scene from the 2007 Stop EPR (European Pressurised Reactor) protest in Toulouse.

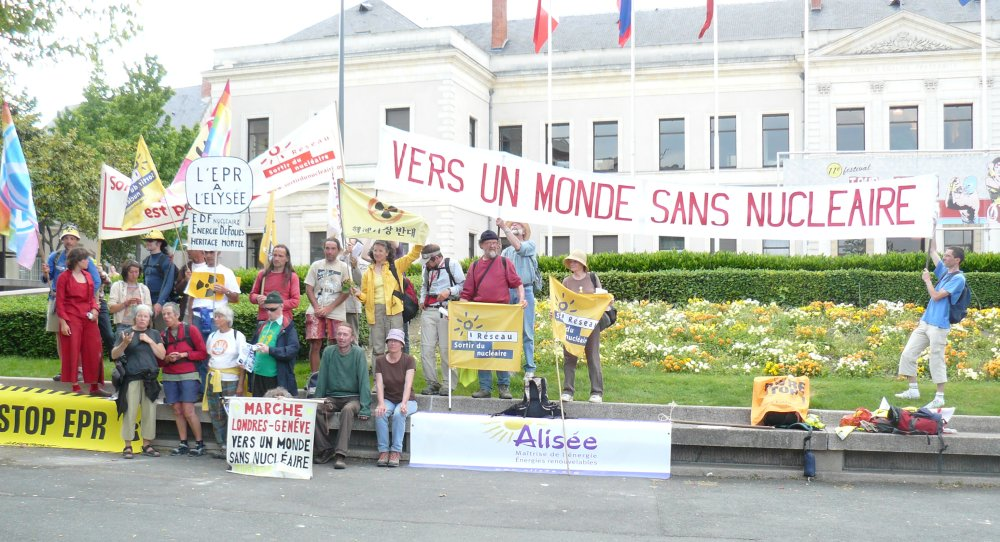
Anti-nuclear march from London to Geneva, 2008.

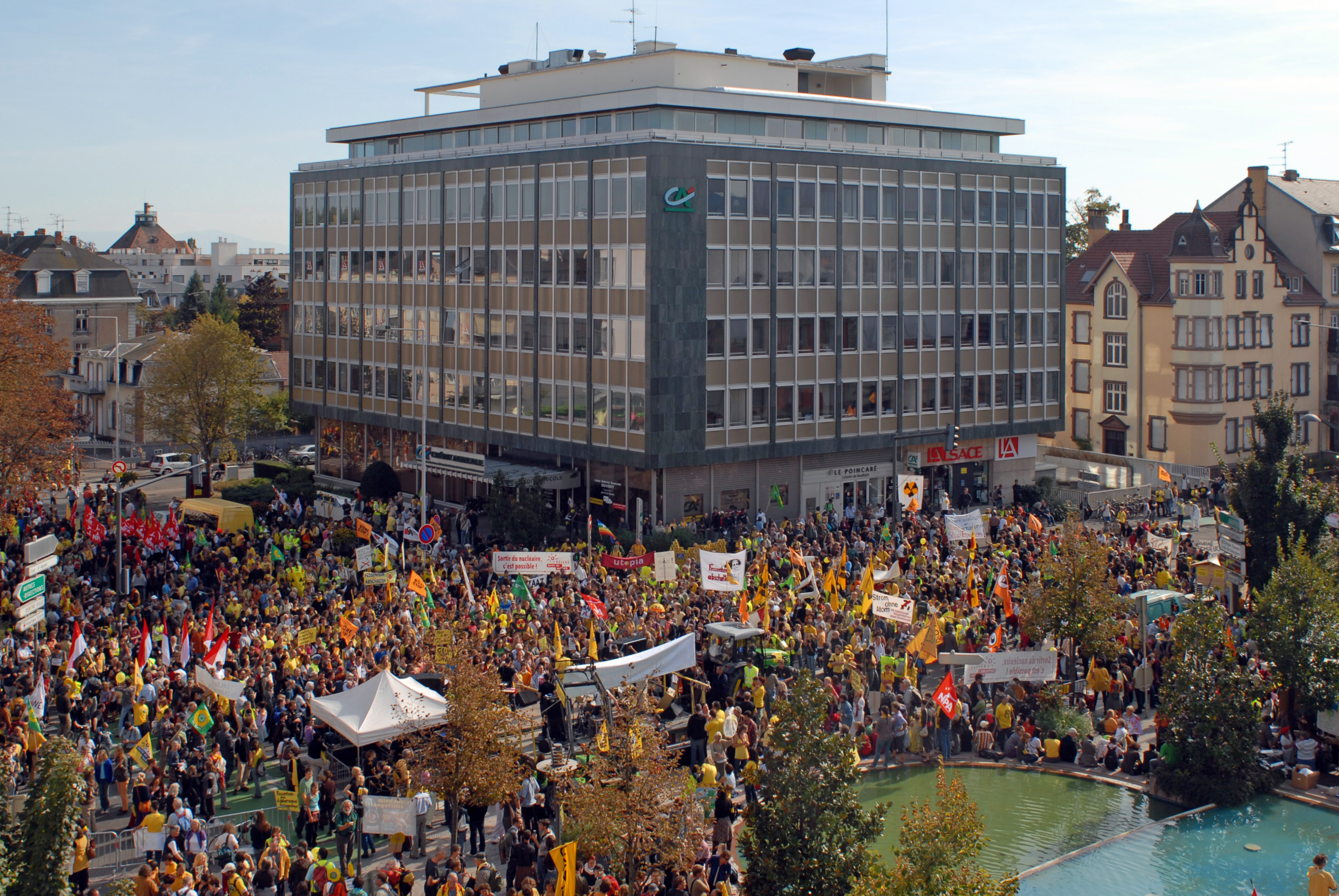
Anti-nuclear demonstration in Colmar, north-eastern France, October 3, 2009.

In France, opposition to nuclear weapons has been somewhat muted since they are perceived as a national symbol and as securing French independence. The strongest anti-nuclear opposition has emerged over nuclear power "as a reaction to the centralising traditions of the French state and the technocratic trends of modern society".

France began a nuclear power program in the 1950s and announced a shift to the Westinghouse light water reactor in 1969. Following the 1973 oil crisis, the government announced a dramatic increase in planned nuclear capacity. These major decisions were put forward as a fait accompli, with no opportunity for meaningful parliamentary debate. An intense extra-parliamentary opposition, of citizens' groups and political action committees, emerged. In the 1970s, there were many large and dramatic anti-nuclear protests and demonstrations in France.

In 1971, 15,000 people demonstrated against French plans to locate the first light -water reactor power plant in Bugey. This was the first of a series of mass protests organized at nearly every planned nuclear site until the massive demonstration at the Superphénix breeder reactor in Creys-Malvillein in 1977 culminated in violence. Between 1975 and 1977, some 175,000 people protested against nuclear power in ten demonstrations.

In 1972, the anti-nuclear weapons movement maintained a presence in the Pacific, largely in response to French nuclear testing there. Activists, including David McTaggart from Greenpeace, defied the French government by sailing small vessels into the test zone and interrupting the testing program. In Australia, thousands joined protest marches in Adelaide, Melbourne, Brisbane, and Sydney. Scientists issued statements demanding an end to the tests; unions refused to load French ships, service French planes, or carry French mail; and consumers boycotted French products. In Fiji, activists formed an Against Testing on Mururoa organization.

On 18 January 1982, Swiss activist and eco-terrorist Chaïm Nissim fired five rockets, obtained from the Red Army Faction through Carlos the Jackal, on the Superphénix nuclear plant, then under construction. Rockets were launched at the incomplete containment building and caused damage, missing the reactor's empty core.

In 1985 the Greenpeace ship Rainbow Warrior was bombed and sunk by the French DGSE in Auckland, New Zealand, as it prepared for another protest of nuclear testing in French military zones. One crew member, Fernando Pereira of Portugal, photographer, drowned on the sinking ship while attempting to recover his photographic equipment. Two members of DGSE were captured and sentenced, but eventually repatriated to France in a controversial affair.

Following the 1986 Chernobyl disaster, radiation levels were much higher than originally thought, and some farmers in the eastern part of France had to plow under tainted lettuce and cabbage crops. French authorities at the time of the Chernobyl disaster were "criticised for a lack of transparency, with many interpreting officials' declarations as saying that radioactive pollution had not crossed the border from Germany into France".

== 2000s ==
In January 2004, up to 15,000 anti-nuclear protesters marched in Paris against a new generation of nuclear reactors, the European Pressurised Reactor (EPR). Also in 2004, an anti-nuclear protester, Sebastien Briat, was run over by a train carrying radioactive waste.

In 2005, thousands of anti-nuclear demonstrators marched to commemorate the 1986 Chernobyl disaster and demand an end to government plans to build a nuclear plant in western France.

On March 17, 2007, simultaneous protests, organised by Sortir du nucléaire (Get Out of Nuclear Power), were staged in 5 French towns to protest construction of EPR plants; Rennes, Lyon, Toulouse, Lille, and Strasbourg.

On April 26, 2007 (the 21st anniversary of the Chernobyl disaster) around 30 protesters blocked entrances and chained themselves to cranes at the EPR site in Flamanville, some remaining on the site for 24 hours. A truck was also parked in front of the entrance to block its access.

In 2008, twenty Greenpeace activists delayed construction of a new nuclear reactor being built in Flamanville for 50 hours. In July 2008 there were a series of accidents at the French nuclear site Tricastin-Pierrelatte, and Greenpeace France launched two court cases in an effort to find out more details about these. In August 2008, Sortir du nucléaire called Areva's radioactive emissions 'very dangerous' and sought an official safety inspection of its factories.

== Post-Fukushima ==
Following the 2011 Fukushima I nuclear accidents, around 1,000 people took part in a protest against nuclear power in Paris on March 20. Most of the protests, however, are focused on the closure of the Fessenheim Nuclear Power Plant, where some 3,800 French and Germans demonstrated on April 8 and April 25.

Thousands staged anti-nuclear protests around France, on the eve of the 25th anniversary of Chernobyl and after Japan's Fukushima nuclear disaster, demanding reactors be closed. Protesters' demands were focused on getting France to shut its oldest nuclear power station at Fessenheim, which lies in a densely populated part of France, less than two kilometres from Germany and around 40 kilometres (25 miles) from Switzerland.

Around 2,000 people also protested at the Cattenom nuclear plant, France's second most powerful, in the Mosel region to the northwest of Strasbourg. Protesters in southwestern France staged another demonstration in the form of a mass picnic in front of the Blayais nuclear reactor, also in memory of Chernobyl. In France's northwestern region of Brittany, around 800 people staged a good-humoured march in front of the Brennilis experimental heavy-water atomic plant that was built in the 1960s. It was taken offline in 1985 but its dismantling is still not completed after 25 years.

Three months after the Fukushima nuclear disaster, thousands of anti-nuclear campaigners protested in Paris.

On June 26, 2011, around 5,000 protesters gathered near Fessenheim nuclear power plant, demanding the plant be shut down immediately. Demonstrators from France and Germany came to Fessenheim and formed a human chain along the road. Protesters claim that the plant is vulnerable to flooding and earthquakes. Fessenheim has become a flashpoint in renewed debate over nuclear safety in France after the Fukushima accident. The plant is operated by French power group EDF.

In November 2011, a French court fined nuclear power giant Électricité de France €1.5m and jailed two senior employees for spying on anti-nuclear group Greenpeace, including hacking into Greenpeace's computer systems. Greenpeace was awarded €500,000 in damages. Although EDF claimed that a security firm had only been employed to monitor Greenpeace, the court disagreed, jailing the head and deputy head of EDF's nuclear security operation for three years each.

In November 2011, thousands of anti-nuclear protesters delayed a train carrying radioactive waste from France to Germany. Many clashes and obstructions made the journey the slowest one since the annual shipments of radioactive waste began in 1995. The shipment, the first since Japan's Fukushima nuclear disaster, faced large protests in France where activists damaged the train tracks. Thousands of people in Germany also interrupted the train's journey, forcing it to proceed at a snail's pace, covering 1,200 kilometers (746 miles) in 109 hours. More than 200 people were reported injured in the protests and several arrests were made.

As of November 2011, France is locked in a national debate over a partial nuclear phaseout. Opinion polls show support for atomic energy has dropped since Fukushima. Forty-percent of the French "are 'hesitant' about nuclear energy while a third are in favor and 17 percent are against, according to a survey by pollster Ifop published November 13". Following François Hollande's victory in the 2012 Presidential Election, there may be a partial nuclear phaseout in France, with his Socialist party in favour of closing the oldest 24 reactors by 2025.

On December 5, 2011, nine Greenpeace activists cut through a fence at the Nogent Nuclear Power Plant. They scaled the roof of the domed reactor building and unfurled a "Safe Nuclear Doesn't Exist" banner before attracting the attention of security guards. Two activists remained at large for four hours. On the same day, two more campaigners breached the perimeter of the Cruas Nuclear Power Plant, escaping detection for more than 14 hours, while posting videos of their sit-in on the internet.

On the first anniversary of the Fukushima nuclear disaster, organisers of French anti-nuclear demonstrations claim 60,000 supporters formed a human chain 230 kilometres long, stretching from Lyon to Avignon.

In March 2014, police arrested 57 Greenpeace protesters who used a truck to break through security barriers and enter the Fessenheim nuclear power plant in eastern France. The activists hung antinuclear banners, but France's nuclear safety authority said that the plant's security had not been compromised. President Hollande had promised to close the plant by 2016, but this has been pushed back until the Flamanville 3 unit comes on line sometime in late 2018.

== See also ==
- Dominique Voynet
- France and weapons of mass destruction
- Nuclear power in France
- Stéphane Lhomme
- Mycle Schneider
- Solange Fernex
- Michèle Rivasi
- Corinne Lepage
- Monique Sené
- Lanza del Vasto
- List of anti-nuclear power groups
- List of Nuclear-Free Future Award recipients
- Lists of nuclear disasters and radioactive incidents
- Groupement des scientifiques pour l'information sur l'énergie nucléaire (Association of Scientists for Information on Nuclear Energy)
