= Nuclear power in France =

Fission-electric stations in France (view)
Active plants
under construction
Closed plants

Electricity production in France has been dominated by nuclear power since the early 1980s with a large portion of that power exported today.

Since the mid-1980s, the largest source of electricity in France has been nuclear power, with a generation of 379.5 TWh in 2019 and a total electricity production of 537.7 TWh. In 2018, the nuclear share was 71.67%, the highest percentage in the world.

Since June 2020, it has 56 operable reactors totalling 61,370 MWe, one under construction (1630 MWe), and 14 shut down or in decommissioning (5,549 MWe). In May 2022, EDF reported that twelve reactors were shut down and being inspected for stress corrosion, requiring EDF to adjust its French nuclear output estimate for 2022 to 280–300 TWh; the estimate of the impact of the decrease in output on the Group's EBITDA for 2022 was assessed to be −€18.5 billion.

Électricité de France (EDF) – the country's main electricity generation and distribution company – manages the country's 56 power reactors. EDF is fully owned by the French government.

Nuclear power was introduced in large quantities in France following the 1973 oil crisis according to the Messmer plan named for then prime minister Pierre Messmer. This was based on projections that large amounts of electric power would be required. Hindsight showed that too much nuclear power capacity was installed, and this led to relatively low production – a low average load factor of 61% by 1988 due to load following generation, and high electricity exports. France exported 38 TWh of electricity to its neighbours in 2017. However, the country still becomes a net importer of electricity when demand exceeds supply, such as in cases of very inclement weather, as in February 2012 when a cold snap, combined with French reliance on electric heating, led it to import large amounts of electricity from Germany.

As of December 2023, according to data from Ember and the Energy Institute as processed by Our World in Data, France generates roughly two-thirds of its electricity from nuclear power, well above the global average of just under 10%. This heavy reliance on nuclear energy allows France to have one of the lowest carbon dioxide emissions per unit of electricity in the world at 85 grams of CO_{2} per kilowatt-hour, compared to the global average of 438 grams. In 2025, nuclear power produced approximately 68% of the country’s electricity.

== History ==
France has a long relationship with nuclear power, starting with Henri Becquerel's discovery of natural radioactivity in the 1890s and continued by famous nuclear scientists such as Pierre and Marie Skłodowska Curie.

Before World War II, France had been mainly involved in nuclear research through the work of the Joliot-Curies. In 1945 the Provisional Government of the French Republic (GPRF) created the Commissariat à l'Énergie Atomique (CEA) governmental agency, and Nobel prize winner Frédéric Joliot-Curie, member of the French Communist Party (PCF) since 1942, was appointed high commissioner. He was relieved of his duties in 1950 for political reasons contingent upon the Cold War, and later was one of the 11 signatories to the Russell-Einstein Manifesto in 1955. The CEA was created by Charles de Gaulle on 18 October 1945. Its mandate is to conduct fundamental and applied research into many areas, including the design of nuclear reactors, the manufacturing of integrated circuits, the use of radionuclides for medical treatments, seismology and tsunami propagation, and the safety of computerized systems.

Nuclear research was discontinued for a time after the war, owing to the instability of the Fourth Republic and the lack of finances available. However, in the 1950s a civil nuclear research program was started, a by-product of which was plutonium. A secret Committee for the Military Applications of Atomic Energy was formed in 1956, and a development program for delivery vehicles started. In 1957, soon after the Suez Crisis and the diplomatic tension with both the USSR and the United States, French president René Coty decided on the creation of the C.S.E.M. in what was then French Sahara, a new nuclear testing facility replacing the CIEES testing facility. See France and nuclear weapons.

The first nuclear power plants in France were three UNGG reactors at the Marcoule Nuclear Site between 1956 and 1960, followed by the Chinon reactors in Avoine from 1962.

=== Messmer Plan ===
As a direct result of the 1973 oil crisis, on 6 March 1974 Prime Minister Pierre Messmer announced what became known as the 'Messmer Plan', a hugely ambitious nuclear power program aimed at generating most of France's electricity from nuclear power. At the time of the oil crisis most of France's electricity came from foreign oil. Nuclear power allowed France to compensate for its lack of indigenous energy resources by applying its strengths in heavy engineering. The situation was summarized in a slogan: "In France, we do not have oil, but we have ideas."

The announcement of the Messmer Plan was enacted without public or parliamentary debate. Concern over the government's action spread among the scientific community of France. The lack of consultation outside of political realms regarding the plan led to the formation of the Groupement des scientifiques pour l'information sur l'énergie nucléaire (Association of Scientists for Information on Nuclear Energy). 4,000 scientists signed a petition as a response, known as the Appeal of the 400 after the 400 scientists who initially signed it.

The reason that the Messmer Plan was enacted without public or parliamentary debate was that there was no tradition to do that with highly-technological and strategically-important decisions in the governments of France and the parliament did not have a scientific commission with sufficient technical means to handle such scientific and strategic decisions, just like the public does not have such means. France does not have any procedure of public inquiries to allow the assessment of major technological programmes. The plan envisaged the construction of around 80 nuclear plants by 1985 and a total of 170 plants by 2000. Work on the first three plants, at Tricastin, Gravelines, and Dampierre, started the same year and France installed 56 reactors over the next 15 years.

However by the mid 1980s it became clear that the Messmer plan had been overambitious. Nuclear power plants achieve their optimum economic value when run flat out, and the projected demand had not materialized. By 1988 France's nuclear power plants had a capacity factor of only around 60%, whereas other countries that had not invested in nuclear power so heavily were nearer 80–90%. Still, the goal of replacing imported fossil fuels in electricity generation was mostly met (France nowadays uses only minuscule amounts of oil to produce electricity and its last two coal power plants Cordemais Power Station and Saint-Avold are to be shut down when the 1600 MW net electric EPR at Flamanville Nuclear Power Plant comes online).

=== Developments 2011–2022 ===
Following the 2011 Fukushima I nuclear accidents, the head of France's nuclear safety agency said that France needed to upgrade the protection of vital functions in all its nuclear reactors to avoid a disaster in the event of a natural calamity, adding there was no need to close any plants. "There is a need to add a layer to protect safety mechanisms in reactors that are vital for the protection of the reactor such as cooling functions and electric powering", Jacques Repussard, head of the IRSN, said. Opinion polls showed support for atomic energy had dropped since Fukushima. Forty percent of the French "are 'hesitant' about nuclear energy while a third are in favor and 17 percent are against, according to a survey by pollster Ifop published November 13".

In February 2012, President Sarkozy decided to extend the life of existing nuclear reactors beyond 40 years, following the Court of Audit decision that that would be the best option, for new nuclear capacity or other forms of energy would be more costly and available too late. Within ten years, 22 out of the 58 reactors will have been operating for over 40 years. The court expects EDF's projected investment programme in existing plant, including post Fukushima safety improvements, will add between 9.5% and 14.5% to generation costs, taking costs to between 37.9 and 54.2 EUR/MWh. Generation costs from the new Flamanville European Pressurized Reactor (EPR) are estimated to be at least in the 70-to-90 EUR/MWh range, depending on construction outcome. Academics at Paris Dauphine University forecast that domestic electricity prices would rise by about 30% by 2020.

Following François Hollande's victory in the 2012 presidential election, it was thought that there might be a partial nuclear phaseout in France. This followed a national debate in the run-up to the election, with President Nicolas Sarkozy backing nuclear power and François Hollande proposing a cut in nuclear power's electricity contribution by more than a third by 2025. It seemed certain that Hollande would at least order the closure of the Fessenheim Nuclear Power Plant by 2017 where there has been an ongoing closure campaign due to concerns about seismic activity and flooding.

Active efforts by the French government to market the EPR have been hampered by cost overruns, delays, and competition from other nations, such as South Korea, which offer simpler, cheaper reactors.

Age in 2020 of French nuclear reactors relative to the beginning of commercial operation

In 2015, the National Assembly voted that by 2025 only 50% of France's energy will be produced by nuclear plants. Environment Minister Nicolas Hulot noted in November 2017 that this goal is unrealistic, postponing the reduction to 2030 or 2035.

In 2016, following a discovery at Flamanville Nuclear Power Plant, about 400 large steel forgings manufactured by Le Creusot Forge since 1965 were found to have carbon-content irregularities that weakened the steel. A widespread programme of reactor checks was started involving a progressive programme of reactor shutdowns, continued over the winter high electricity demand period into 2017. This caused power price increases in Europe as France increased electricity imports, especially from Germany, to augment supply. As of late October 2016, 20 of France's 58 reactors were offline. These steel quality concerns may prevent the regulator giving the life extensions from 40 to 50 years, that had been assumed by energy planners, for many reactors. In December 2016, the Wall Street Journal characterised the problem as a "decades long coverup of manufacturing problems", with Areva executives acknowledging that Le Creusot had been falsifying documents. The Le Creusot forge was out of operation from December 2015 to January 2018 while improvements to process controls, the quality management system, organisation and safety culture were made.

In November 2018, President Macron announced the 50% nuclear power reduction target is being delayed to 2035, and would involve closing fourteen 900 MWe reactors. The two oldest reactors, units 1 and 2 at Fessenheim, were closed in 2020. EDF is planning an investment programme, called Grand Carénage, to extend reactor lifespans to 50 years, to be largely completed by 2025.

In 2020, Energy Minister Élisabeth Borne announced the government would not decide on the construction of any new reactors until Flamanville 3 started operation after 2022. In October 2021, Macron announced plans for France to become a leader in low-carbon energy production using small modular reactors and green hydrogen. In October 2021, French grid operator RTE plans for construction of six new EPR reactors so that by 2050, France maintains 50 GW in low-carbon nuclear power. This has been described as the fastest and most certain path to achieve carbon neutrality by 2050.

In January 2022, junior environment minister Bérangère Abba said that plans for new nuclear EPR 2 reactors, to be operational between 2035 and 2037, should be submitted around 2023. The decision was accelerated by the impact of 2021 global energy crisis. In February 2022, Macron added that the plan includes the construction of 14 new large nuclear reactors and the extension of life of existing reactors deemed safe and suitable beyond 50 years.

On 3 September 2022, amid energy uncertainties arising from the 2022 Russian invasion of Ukraine, the Energy Transition Minister, Agnes Pannier-Runacher, announced that EDF was committed to restarting all reactors in the coming winter.

In 2023, during a presidential visit to China, France renewed a nuclear co-operation agreement with China, and EDF renewed its 2007 partnership contract with China General Nuclear Power Group which includes development, construction and operation of nuclear plants.

=== Crisis since late 2021 ===
After scheduled maintenance during the summer of 2021, some power plants were not back in service in late 2021. In October, stress corrosion cracking at Civaux Nuclear Power Plant led to the decision to shut down both blocks for long term repair. In December 2021, this was extended to both blocks of Chooz Nuclear Power Plant, as all four plants use the same type of reactor, N4, the most modern in operation, with grid connection in the late 1990s, commercial operation since early 2000s. By end of April 2022 it was reported that 28 of France's 56 nuclear reactors were offline. French nuclear energy production has fallen to the lowest level since 1993 and it is expected to fall short by at least 25% compared to usual production levels in the winter of 2022/2023.

On 19 May 2022, EDF adjusted its French nuclear output estimate for 2022 between 280 and 300 TWh, and with the expectation of checks and repairs to be completed, the 2023 French nuclear output estimate was not changed (300–330 TWh). Considering the overall control and repair program, nuclear generation for 2024 may be impacted.

Electricity production in 2022 was 279 TWh, with 300–330 TWh still forecast for 2023 as of June 2023.

On 21 February 2022, S&P Global Ratings and Moody's downgraded the credit rating of EDF citing the technical issues at its nuclear power plants. In July 2022 the French government announced its plans to fully nationalize EDF. To meet demand, EDF had to buy electricity on the European market at high prices, costing an estimated €29 billion by June 2023.

As of early September 2022, 32 of France's 56 nuclear reactors were shut down due to maintenance or technical problems. In 2022, Europe's driest summer in 500 years had serious consequences for power plant cooling systems, as the drought reduced the amount of river water available for cooling.

During 2023, stress corrosion cracking was found in some straight pipe sections; previously it had only been found in pipe with bends so subject to additional stress form thermal stratification as fluids flowed through bends. One crack was to a depth of 23 mm in a wall thickness of 27 mm.

== Management and economics ==
Électricité de France (EDF) – the country's main electricity generation and distribution company – manages the country's nuclear power plants. In 2007 EDF was substantially owned by the French government, with around 85% of EDF shares in government hands. 78.9% of Areva shares are owned by the French public sector company CEA and are therefore in public ownership. EDF remains heavily in debt. Its profitability suffered during the recession which began in 2008. It made €3.9 billion in 2009, which fell to €1.02 billion in 2010, with provisions set aside amounting to €2.9 billion. The Nuclear industry has been accused of significant cost overruns and failing to cover the total costs of operation, including waste management and decommissioning.

In 2001, nuclear construction and services company Areva was created by the merger of CEA Industrie, Framatome and Cogema (now Areva NC). Its main shareholder is the French owned company CEA, but the German federal government also holds, through Siemens, 34% of the shares of Areva's subsidiary, Areva NP, in charge of building the EPR (third-generation nuclear reactor).

In 2010, as part of the progressive liberalisation of the energy market under EU directives, France agreed the Accès régulé à l'électricité nucléaire historique (ARENH) regulations that allowed third party suppliers access up to about a quarter of France's pre-2011 nuclear generation capacity, at a fixed price of €42/MWh from 1 July 2011 until 31 December 2025.

Nations based on nuclear output as a percentage of national power output

As of 2014, France's household electricity price, excluding taxation, was the 12th highest amongst the 28 member European Union and the 11th cheapest to industrial consumers. The actual cost of generating electricity by nuclear power is not published by EDF or the French government but is estimated to be between €59/MWh and €83/MWh.

EDF said its third-generation nuclear reactor EPR project at its Flamanville, northern France, plant will be delayed until 2016, due to "both structural and economic reasons," which will bring the project's total cost to EUR8.5 billion. Similarly, the cost of the Olkiluoto Nuclear Power Plant (EPR) to be built in Finland has escalated. Areva and the utility involved "are in bitter dispute over who will bear the cost overruns and there is a real risk now that the utility will default. EDF has suggested that if the political environment causes the EPR costs to overrun, the design would be replaced with a cheaper and simpler Franco-Japanese design, the Atmea for which the design will be completed by 2013, or the already operating Franco-Chinese design, the CPR-1000." In July 2018, EDF further delayed fuel loading to Q4 2019 and increased the project's cost estimate by a further €400 million (US$467.1 million). Startup is now scheduled to occur no earlier than Q2 2020 and EDF now estimates project costs at €10.9 billion (US$12.75 billion), three times the original cost estimates. Hot testing is currently planned to occur by the end of 2018

In July 2015, EDF agreed to take a majority stake in Areva NP, following a French government instruction they create a "global strategic partnership".

In 2016, the European Commission assessed that France's nuclear decommissioning liabilities were seriously underfunded, with only 23 billion euros of earmarked assets to cover 74.1 billion euros of expected decommissioning costs.

In October 2019, French Finance Minister Bruno Le Maire released an audit report on the construction of the heavily delayed and nearly four times over-budget Flamanville 3 EPR development, started by Areva in 2007, which assessed it as largely a project management and skills failure. The Finance Minister demanded EDF present within a month an action plan for the project, calling it "a failure for the entire French nuclear industry".

In 2020, the French government announced plans to change the wholesale nuclear power market, to enable EDF to completely cover its costs while preventing price volatility. A "price corridor" with floor and ceiling price limits would be defined for wholesale nuclear power electricity, rather than the current fixed €42/MWh for a quarter of production, which third-party suppliers used to avoid peak period high prices. A price band of €42-48/MWh has been suggested, though pricing would be controlled by regulator Commission de régulation de l'énergie (CRE). Some prefer a higher price band to finance new nuclear builds to replace older reactors, for example Francois Dos Santos of the EDF central works council suggested a €47-53/MWh price band.

EDF has a program, named Grand Carénage and billed at €49.4 billion, to life extend by 2025 nearly all French power reactors from 40 to 50 years lifetime. These have been approved by regulatory body ASN in February 2021.

== Technical overview ==
Map of operating French nuclear power reactors, by class

Drawing such a large percentage of overall electrical production from nuclear power is unique to France. This reliance has resulted in certain necessary deviations from the standard design and function of other nuclear power programs. For instance, in order to meet changing demand throughout the day, some plants must work as peaking power plants, whereas most nuclear plants in the world operate as base-load plants, and allow other fossil or hydro units to adjust to demand. Nuclear power in France has a total capacity factor of around 77%, which is low compared to nuclear power plants in other countries due to load following. Fleet availability has been declining in recent years, averaging approximately 72% over the 2020-2021 operating years. This is quite low compared to other, less dominant nuclear plant fleets and has been impacted by Government policies intended to reduce Nuclear power generation.

The first eight power reactors in the nation were gas cooled reactor types (UNGG reactor), whose development was pioneered by CEA. Coinciding with a uranium enrichment program, EDF developed pressurized water reactor (PWR) technology which eventually became the dominant type. The gas-cooled reactors located at Brennilis, Bugey, Chinon, and Marcoule have all been shut down.

All operating plants today are PWRs. The sodium-cooled fast breeder reactor technology development reactors, Phénix and Superphénix, have been shut down. Work on a more advanced design in the form of the ASTRID reactor was finally abandoned in September 2019.However, a number of advanced small modular designs are under development, including a lead-cooled fast neutron reactor (Newcleo), a sodium-cooled fast neutron reactor (Hexana), and a molten salt reactor (Stellaria).

The PWR plants were all developed by Framatome (now Areva) from the initial Westinghouse design. All currently operating PWR plants are of three design variations, having output powers of 900 MWe, 1300 MWe, and 1450 MWe. The repeated use of these standard variants of a design has afforded France the greatest degree of nuclear plant standardization in the world.

Comparison between Framatome Reactors
	900 MWe	1300 MWe	1450 MWe	EPR
Design	CP0, CP1, CP2	P4, P'4	N4	EPR
Power				
Net electrical power (MW)	915	1,320	1,450	1,600
Gross electrical power (MW)	965	1,370	1,530	1,700
Nominal thermal power	2,785	3,817	4,250	4,324
Containment enclosure				
Type	simple	double	double	double
Internal enclosure	Prestressed concrete	Prestressed concrete	Prestressed concrete	Prestressed concrete
Sealing skin (metal liner)	yes	no	no	yes
Inner diameter (m)	37	47.8	43.8	48
Interior height in the center (m)	55.88	55.56	57.48	48
Wall thickness (m)	0.9	1.2	1.2	1.3
External enclosure		Prestressed concrete	Prestressed concrete	Prestressed concrete
Wall thickness (m)		0.55	0.55	1.3
Primary circuit				
Operating pressure (MPa)	15.5	15.5	15.5	15.5
Water temperature at the tank inlet (°C)	286	292.8	292.2	295.6
Water temperature at the tank outlet (°C)	323.2	328.7	329.6	330.2
Number of loops	3	4	4	4
Volume of the primary circuit (with pressurizer) (m^{3})	271	399	406	460
Tank				
Inner diameter (mm)	4,003	4,394	4,486	4,885
Total height (m)	13.2	13.6	13,645	13,105
Thickness of the wall at core height (mm)	200	220	225	250
Steam generator	3	4	4	4
Steam pressure (bar abs)	58	64.8	72.8	77.4
Temperature (°C)	273	281	288	293
Steam flow (t/h)	1,820	1,909	2,164	2 197
Exchange surface (m^{2})	4,746	6,940	7,308	7,960
Total height (m)	20.6	22.3	21.9	24.2
Core				
Fuel	UO_{2} (3-5%)	UO_{2} (3-5%)	UO_{2} (3-5%)	UO_{2} (3-5%)
Active height of rod (mm)	3,660	4,270	4,270	4,200
Diameter of the pellets (mm)	8.2	8.2	8.2	8.2
External diameter of rod (mm)	9.5	9.5	9.5	9.5
Rod sheath	Zircaloy	Zircaloy	Zircaloy	M5
Number rod per assembly	264	264	264	265
Number of fuel assembly	157	193	205	241
Number of control clusters	57	65	73	89
Primary pump				
Nominal flow rate per pump (m^{3}.h^{-1})	21,250	23,325	24,500	27,195
Power	5 400	5 910	6 600	8 000

=== 900 MWe class (CP0, CP1 and CP2 designs) ===
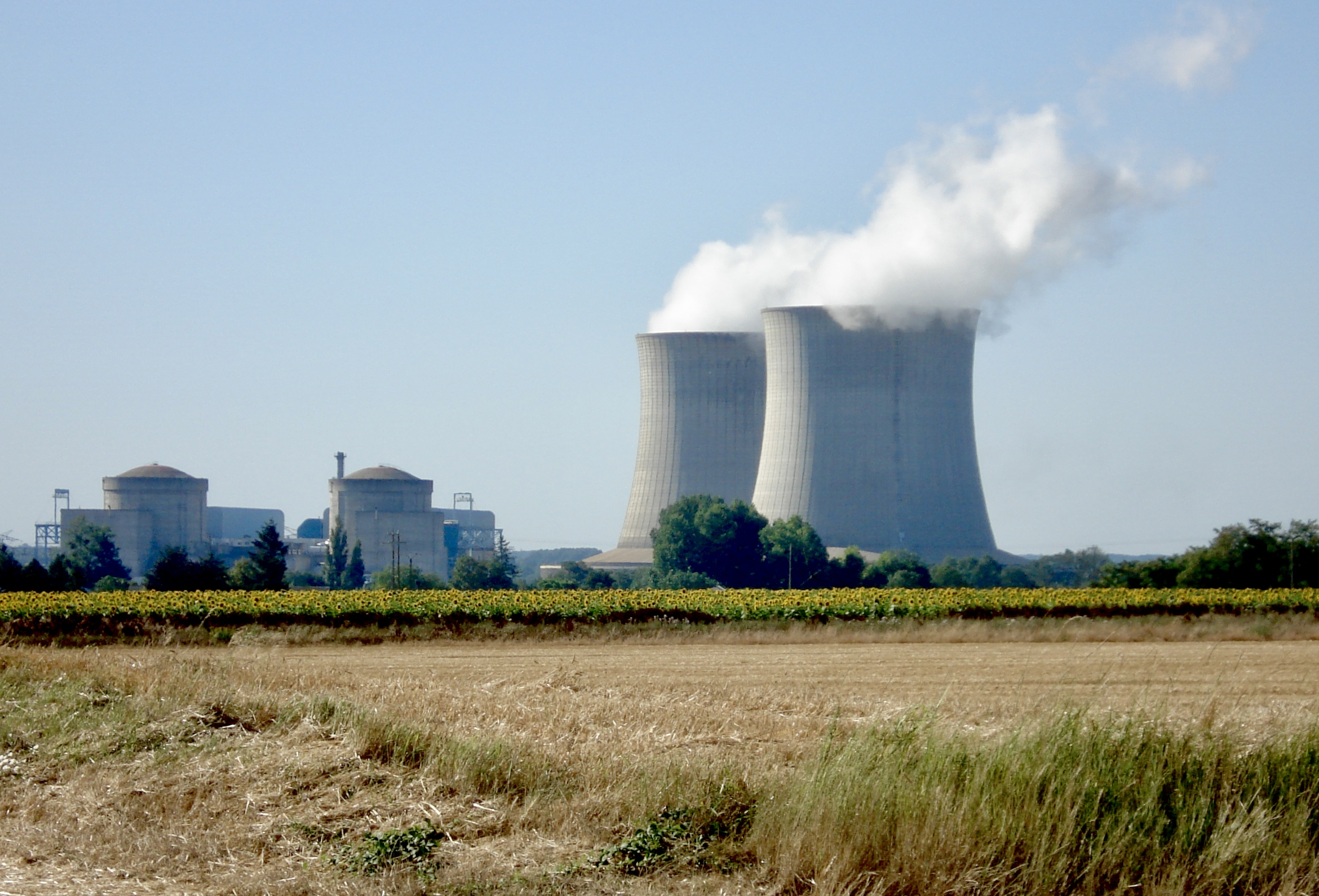
The Saint-Laurent site, showing two CP2, 900 MWe class reactors and the cooling tower on the right

Based on the Beaver Valley Nuclear Power Station and later the North Anna Nuclear Generating Station, the CP series was the first Westinghouse-type reactors to be built in France. There are a total of 34 of these reactors in operation; most were constructed in the 1970s and the early 1980s. In 2002, they had a uniform review and all were granted a 10-year life extension.

With the CP0 and CP1 designs, two reactors share the same machine and command room. With the CP2 design, each reactor has its own machine and command room. Apart from this difference, CP1 and CP2 use the same technologies, and the two types are frequently referred to as CPY. Compared to CP0 they have an additional cooling circuit between the emergency system that in case of an accident allows to spray water into the containment and the circuit which contains river water, a more flexible control system and some minor difference in the layout of the building.

This three loop design (three steam generators and three primary circulation pumps) was also exported to a number of other countries, including:

- South Africa – two units at the Koeberg nuclear power station
- South Korea – two units at the Ulchin Nuclear Power Plant
- China, also designated as M310:
  - Two units at the Daya Bay Nuclear Power Plant
  - Two units at the Ling Ao Nuclear Power Plant
  - Further development led into the 1000 MW CPR-1000 design.

In February 2021, Autorité de sûreté nucléaire gave generic authorisation, subject to conditions, for a ten-year life extension beyond the design life of 40 years of the French 900 MWe reactors. Specific reviews of each reactor are still required.

=== 1300 MWe class (P4 and P'4 designs) ===
The Cattenom site houses four 1300 MWe class reactors

There are 20 reactors of this design (four steam generators and four primary circulation pumps) operating in France. The P4 and P'4 type have some minor difference in the layout of the building, especially for the structure which contain the fuel rods and the circuitry.

In July 2025 French regulator (French Nuclear Safety and Radiation Protection Authority) has decided EDF can operate 1300 MWe reactors beyond the initial 40 years lifespan.

=== 1500 MWe class (N4 design) ===
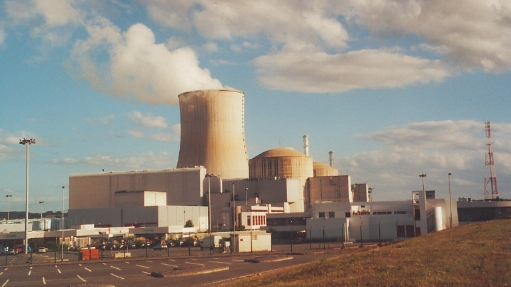
The Civaux site houses two 1500 MWe class reactors, the most recent design operating today

There are only four of these reactors, housed at two separate sites: Civaux and Chooz. Construction of these reactors started between 1984 and 1991, but full commercial operation did not begin until between 2000 and 2002 because of thermal fatigue flaws in the heat removal system requiring the redesign and replacement of parts in each N4 power station. By 2002 the reactors had been uprated from 1450 MWe to 1500 MWe. Serious stress corrosion cracking in the stainless steel safety system piping was discovered to 2021, requiring shutdowns for inspections and repair.

=== 1650 MWe class (EPR design) ===
The next generation design for French reactors is the EPR, which is also intended for foreign markets. The EPR was originally developed as a German-French joint project to incorporate the advantages of the highly reliable German Konvoi design as well as French experience at mass construction of relatively "standardized" nuclear facilities. The design was intended to be built in both Germany and France as well as various export markets. However, the German nuclear phase-out precluded any construction of EPRs in Germany and ultimately led to Siemens selling its shares in the joint venture (see below). Two EPR units are in operation at Taishan in China, one at Olkiluoto in Finland and one at Flamanville in France. In the United Kingdom, two units are under construction at Hinkley Point C and two are planned at Sizewell C.

In June 2023, EDF announced it was starting the authorisation process to build two EPR 2 reactors at the Penly Nuclear Power Plant, anticipating that site preparatory work would begin in summer 2024 and construction would begin about 2027.

The reactor design was developed by Areva contributing its N4 reactor technology and the German company Siemens contributing its Konvoi reactor technology. In keeping with the French approach of highly standardized plants and proven technology, it uses more traditional active safety systems and is more similar to current plant designs than international competitors such as the AP1000 or the ESBWR.

In 2013, EDF acknowledged the difficulties it was having building the EPR design. In September 2015, EDF's chief executive, Jean-Bernard Lévy, stated that the design of a "New Model" EPR (later called EPR2) was being worked on, which will be easier and cheaper to build, which would be ready for orders from about 2020. The EPR2 design maintains the post-Fukushima safety measures of the EPR, but simpler construction and lower capital costs are exchanged for the ease of maintenance of the original EPR design that are due to the "two-room" containment and fourth safety train. In 2016, EDF planned to build two New Model EPR reactors in France by 2030 to prepare for renewing its fleet of older reactors. However following financial difficulties at Areva, and its merger with EDF, French Energy Minister Nicolas Hulot said in January 2018 "for now [building a New Model EPR] is neither a priority or a plan. Right now the priority is to develop renewable energy and to reduce the share of nuclear."

In March 2025, the Nuclear Policy Council agreed that a subsidised government loan should be made available to cover at least half the build cost of six EPR2 reactors. A Contract for Difference at no more than €100 per MWh would cover the remaining costs. The first three double EPR2 reactors are proposed for the Penly, Gravelines and Bugey sites, with construction starting in 2027.

=== Cooling ===
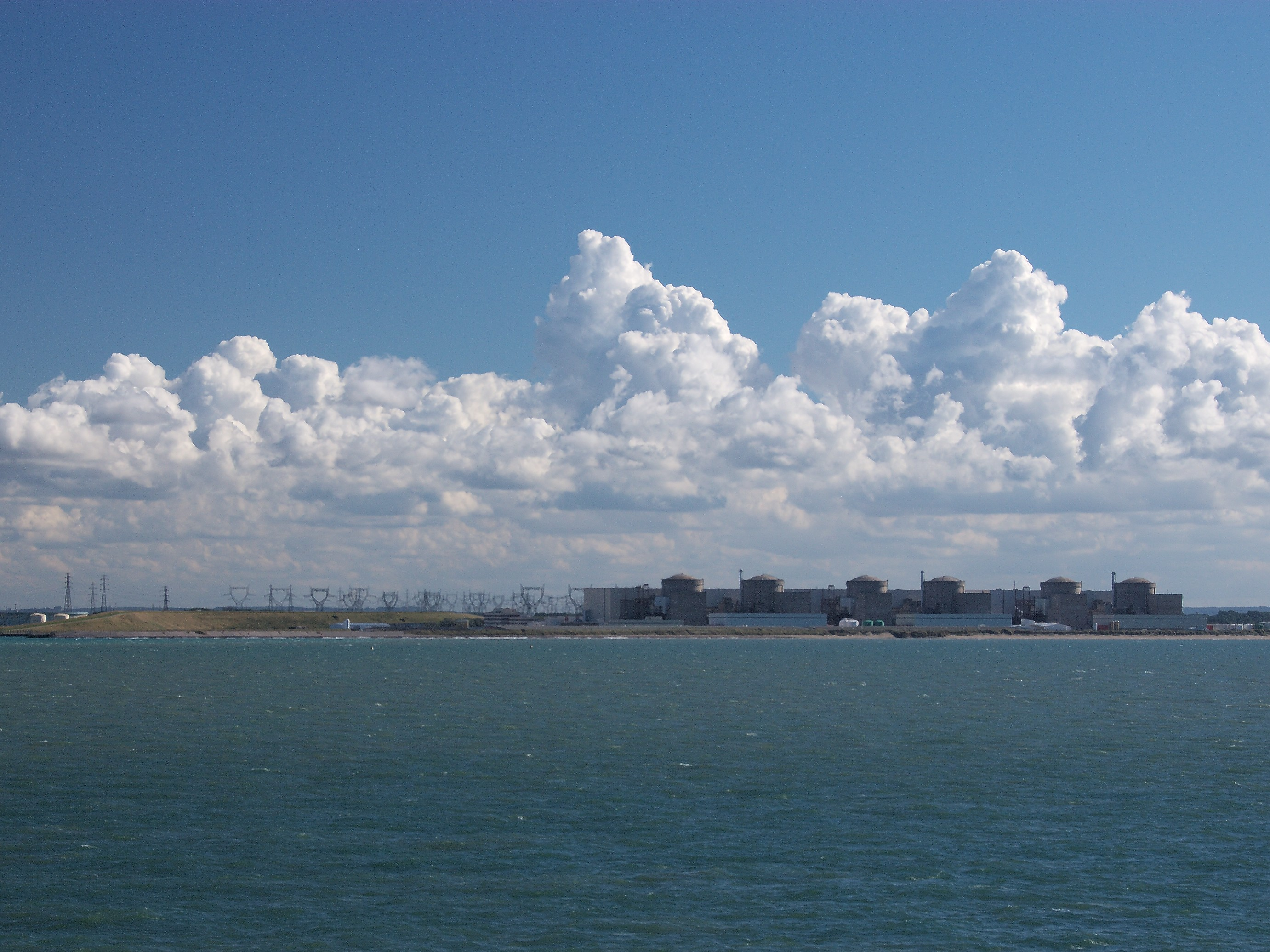
The Gravelines site on the North Sea between Calais and Dunkirk

The majority of nuclear plants in France are located away from the coasts and obtain their cooling water from rivers. These plants employ cooling towers to reduce their impact on the environment. The temperature of emitted water carrying the waste heat is strictly limited by the French government, and this has proved to be problematic during recent heat waves.

Five plants, equaling 18 reactors, are located on the coast:

- Gravelines Nuclear Power Station
- Penly Nuclear Power Plant
- Paluel Nuclear Power Plant
- Flamanville Nuclear Power Plant
- Blayais Nuclear Power Plant

These five get their cooling water directly from the ocean and can thus dump their waste heat directly back into the sea, which is slightly more economical.

=== Fuel cycle ===
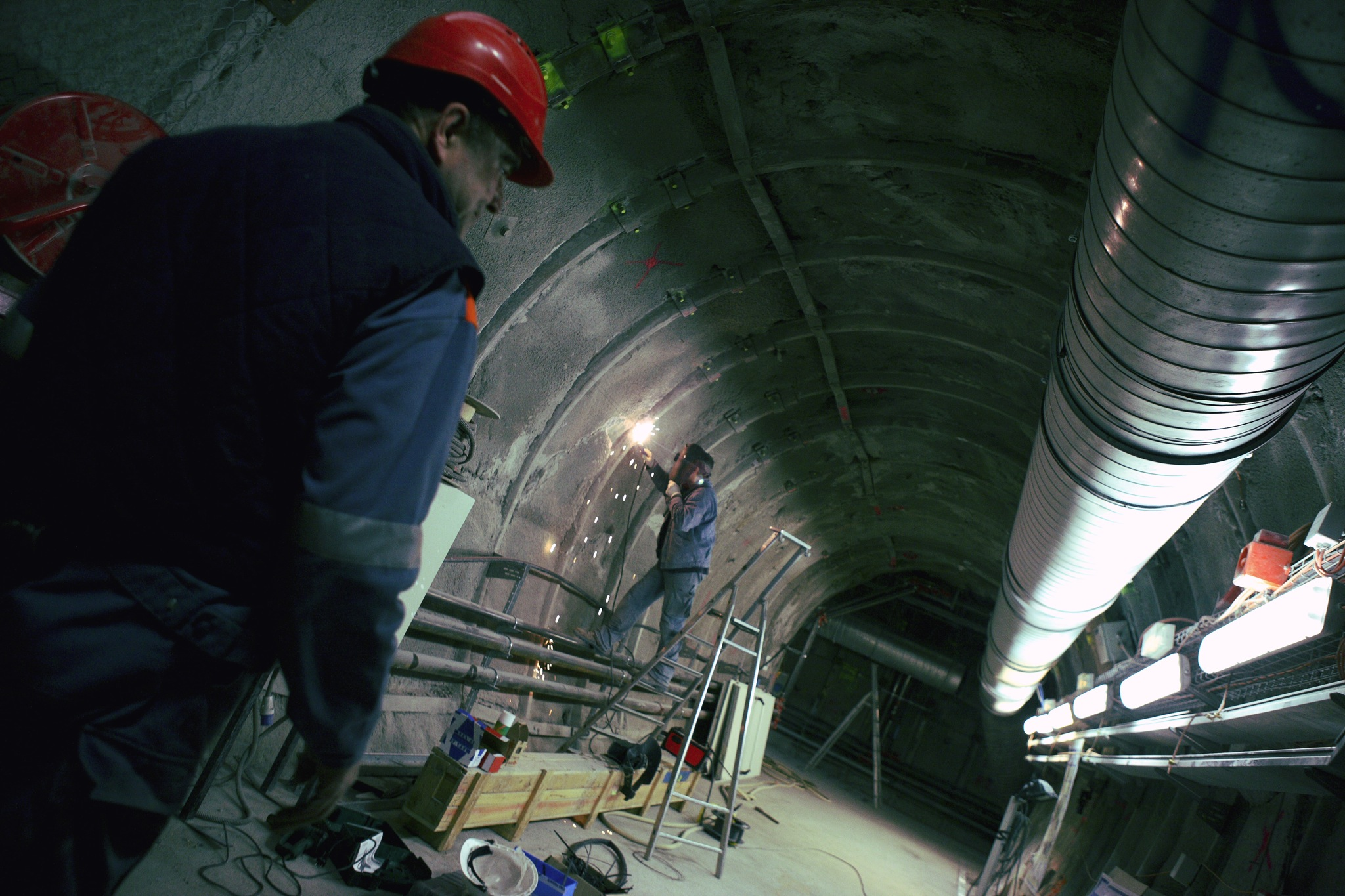
Active work going on for the ultimate underground repository

France is one of the few countries in the world with an active civilian nuclear reprocessing program, with the COGEMA La Hague site. Enrichment work, some MOX fuel fabrication, and other activities take place at the Tricastin Nuclear Power Centre. Enrichment is completely domestic and was powered by 2/3 of the output of the nuclear plant at Tricastin before the switch from gaseous diffusion to gas centrifugation in the early 2010s increased efficiency thirty-fold. Reprocessing of fuel from other countries has been done for the United States and Japan, who have expressed the desire to develop a more closed fuel cycle similar to what France has achieved. MOX fuel fabrication services have also been sold to other countries, notably to the US for the Megatons to Megawatts Program, using plutonium from dismantled nuclear weapons. After the cancellation of German plans to build a nuclear fuel reprocessing plant at Wackersdorf, Germany also relied on the La Hague facility for its civilian reprocessing before switching to the once-through fuel cycle in 2005.

While France does not mine uranium for the front end of the fuel cycle domestically, French companies have various holdings in the uranium market. Uranium for the French program totalled 8000 tonnes annually as of 2014. Areva is involved in uranium mining operations in Canada, Kazakhstan, Namibia, and Niger. Several French former colonies have significant uranium reserves and French companies have stayed active in many of them even after those countries became independent. Due to the CFA Franc countries having a currency peg first to the French Franc and now to its successor, the euro, economic relations between these former French colonies and their former metropole remain strong.

Final disposal of the high level nuclear waste is planned to be done at the Meuse/Haute Marne Underground Research Laboratory deep geological repository.

== Operational considerations ==
France's nuclear reactors comprise 90 per cent of EDFs capacity and so they are used in load-following mode and some reactors close at weekends because there is no market for the electricity. This means that the capacity factor is low by world standards, usually in the high seventies as a percentage, which is not an ideal economic situation for nuclear plants.

During periods of high demand, EDF has been routinely "forced into the relatively expensive spot and short-term power markets because it lacks adequate peak load generating capacity". France heavily relies on electric heating, with about one third of existing and three-quarters of new houses using electric space heating due to the low off-peak tariffs offered. Due to this residential heating demand, about 2.3 GW of extra power is needed for every degree Celsius of temperature drop. This means that during cold snaps, French electricity demand increases dramatically, forcing the country to import at full capacity from its neighbours during peak demand. For example, in February 2012, Germany "came to the rescue of France during last week's cold snap by massively exporting electricity to its neighbour".

Around two thirds of EDFs plant capacity is inland and requires fresh water for cooling. Eleven of these fifteen inland plants have cooling towers, using evaporative cooling, while the others use lake or river water directly. In very hot summers, generation output may be restricted due to legal limits on the amount and temperature of cooling water released into the final heat sink (i.e. local rivers).

In 2008, nuclear power accounted for 16% of final energy consumption in France. As is common in all industrialized nations, fossil fuels still dominate energy consumption, particularly in the transportation and heating sectors. However, nuclear constitutes a higher level of total energy consumption in France than in any other country. In 2001, nuclear power accounted for 37% of the total energy consumption in France. In 2011, France consumed about 3,200 TWh (11 quadrillion BTU) of energy according to the Energy Information Administration. Even so, due to the extensive high speed rail network (which runs on electricity) and the common use of resistive heating (and in some cases heat pumps) for domestic heating, the use of fossil fuels for those sectors is also lower than in peer nations, which still rely more on domestic flights, fossil fueled motorcars and fossil fueled heating, respectively.

=== Import and export ===
The heavy investment in nuclear power energy requires electricity export when French electricity demand is low, or low-price dumping in the French market, and encourages the use of electricity for space heating and water heating. Due to Germany's Energiewende increasing the volatility of supply – and therefore wholesale electricity prices – in France's most populous neighboring country, France tends to export huge amounts of electricity eastward during a Dunkelflaute, while importing similarly large amounts (sometimes at negative prices) when weather conditions are favorable to German wind and solar production.

France, on a net basis, exported 21.5 TWh of electricity to its neighbours in the second half of 2021. However, the country relied on imports from Spain and Belgium at the end of 2021 due to cold weather and multiple outages at its nuclear plants.

== Accidents and incidents ==
Nuclear power accidents in France
Date	Location	Description	Cost (millions USD 2006)	INES level
17 October 1969	Saint-Laurent-Nouan	50 kg of uranium in one of the reactors at the Saint-Laurent Nuclear Power Plant began to melt, an event classified at 'level 4' on the International Nuclear Event Scale (INES). As of March 2011, this remains the most serious civil nuclear power accident in France.	?	4
25 July 1979	Saclay	Radioactive fluids escape into drains designed for ordinary wastes, seeping into the local watershed at the Saclay BL3 Reactor	5	
13 March 1980	Saint-Laurent-Nouan	A malfunctioning cooling system fuses fuel elements together at the Saint Laurent A2 reactor, ruining the fuel assembly and forcing an extended shutdown	22	4
14 April 1984	Bugey	Electrical cables fail at the command centre of the Bugey Nuclear Power Plant and force a complete shutdown of one reactor	2	
22 May 1986	Normandy	A reprocessing plant at La Hague malfunctions and exposes workers to unsafe levels of radiation and forces five to be hospitalised	5	
12 April 1987	Saint-Paul-Trois-Châteaux	Tricastin fast breeder reactor leaks coolant, sodium and uranium hexachloride, injuring seven workers and contaminating water supplies	50	
27 December 1999	Blayais	An unexpectedly strong storm floods the Blayais Nuclear Power Plant, forcing an emergency shutdown after injection pumps and containment safety systems fail from water damage	55	
21 January 2002	Manche	Control systems and safety valves fail after improper installation of condensers, forcing a two-month shutdown	102	2
16 May 2005	Cattenom	Sub-standard electrical cables at the Cattenom-2 nuclear reactor cause a fire in an electricity tunnel, damaging safety systems	12	
13 July 2008	Saint-Paul-Trois-Châteaux	Tricastin nuclear power plant: 75 kg of natural uranium, in thousands of litres of solution, accidentally spilled on the ground and run off into a nearby river	7	1
12 August 2009	Gravelines	Fuel rod bundle gets stuck during routine refueling of Gravelines Nuclear Power Plant, causing a delay in the refueling operation	2	1
12 September 2011	Marcoule	One person was killed and four injured, in a blast at the Marcoule Nuclear Site. The explosion took place in a furnace used to melt metallic waste and did not represent a nuclear accident.	?	

In July 2008, 18,000 litres (4,755 gallons) of uranium solution containing natural uranium were accidentally released from Tricastin Nuclear Power Centre. Due to cleaning and repair work the containment system for a uranium solution holding tank was not functional when the tank filled. The inflow exceeded the tank's capacity and 30 cubic metres of uranium solution leaked, with 18 cubic metres spilled on the ground. Testing found elevated uranium levels in the nearby Gaffière and Lauzon rivers. The liquid that escaped to the ground contained about 75 kg of natural uranium, which is toxic as a heavy metal, but only slightly radioactive. Estimates for the releases were initially higher, up to 360 kg of natural uranium, but revised downward later. French authorities banned the use of water from the Gaffière and Lauzon for drinking and watering of crops for 2 weeks. Swimming, water sports and fishing were also banned. This incident has been classified as Level 1 (anomaly) on the International Nuclear Event Scale. Shortly after the first incident, approximately 100 employees were exposed to minor doses of radiation (1/40 of the annual limit) due to a piping failure.

In October 2017, EDF announced it would repair fire safety system pipes at 20 nuclear reactors to increase seismic safety after discovering thinning metal in some sections of pipes. EDF classified this as a Level 2 (incident) on the International Nuclear Event Scale.

== Nuclear safety ==
In 2006, the Autorité de sûreté nucléaire (ASN) was created as the independent French nuclear safety regulator, replacing the General Direction for Nuclear Safety and Radioprotection.

In 2012, the ASN released a report announcing a sweeping safety upgrade to all the country's reactors. The ASN's report states plainly that a loss of coolant or electricity could, in the worst cases, see meltdowns at nuclear reactors in hours. It also lists many shortcomings found during 'stress tests', in which some safety aspects of plants were found not to meet existing standards. It will now require all power plants to build a set of safety systems of last resort, contained in bunkers that will be hardened to withstand more extreme earthquakes, floods and other threats than plants themselves are designed to cope with. It will also adopt a proposal by EDF to create an elite force that is specifically trained to tackle nuclear accidents and could be deployed to any site within hours. Both moves are a response to the Fukushima nuclear disaster.

=== Seismicity ===
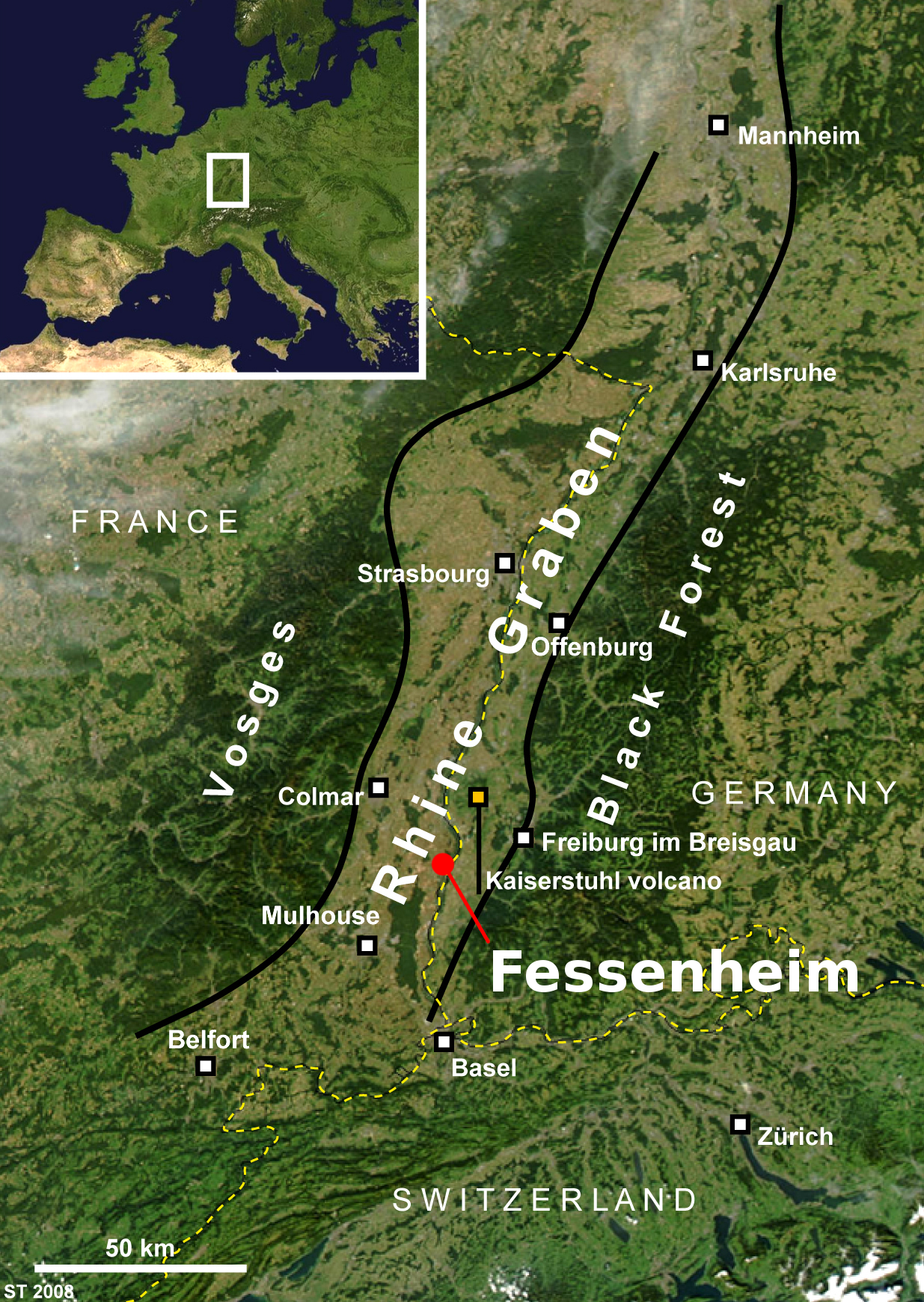
The location of the Fessenheim Nuclear Power Plant in the Rhine Rift Valley near the fault that caused the 1356 Basel earthquake is causing concern

Following the 2011 Fukushima I nuclear accidents, there has been an increased focus on the risks associated with seismic activity in France, with particular attention focused on the Fessenheim Nuclear Power Plant.

General seismic risk in France is categorised on a five-point scale, with zone 1 being very low risk, through to zone 5 in areas with a 'very strong' risk. In Metropolitan France the areas of highest risk are rated at 4, 'strong', and are located in the Pyrenees, Alps, the south of the Haut-Rhin département, the Territoire de Belfort and a few communes in Doubs. A new zoning map comes into force on 1 May 2011, which significantly increases the rating for many areas. The major nuclear research facilities at Cadarache are located in a zone 4 area near the fault that caused the 1909 Lambesc earthquake, while the Marcoule research centre and the nuclear power plants at Tricastin, Cruas, Saint-Alban, Bugey and Fessenheim (near the fault that caused the 1356 Basel earthquake) are all within zone 3. A further six plants lie within zone 2.

The current process for evaluating the seismic hazard for a nuclear plant is set out in Règle Fondamentale de Sûreté (Fundamental Safety Rule) RFS 2001-01, published by the Institute for Radioprotection and Nuclear Safety, which uses more detailed seismotectonic zones. RFS 2001-01 replaced RFS I.2.c, published in 1981, however it has been criticised for continuing to require a deterministic assessment (rather than a probabilistic approach) that relies primarily on the strongest 'historically known' earthquake near a site. This leads to a number of problems including the short period (in geological timescales) for which there are records, the difficulty of assessing the characteristics of earthquakes that occurred prior to the use of seismometers, the difficulty of identifying the existence of all earthquakes that pre-date the historic record, and ultimately the reliance on one single earthquake scenario. Other criticisms include the use of intensity in the evaluation method, rather than spectral acceleration, which is commonly used elsewhere.

== Public opinion ==
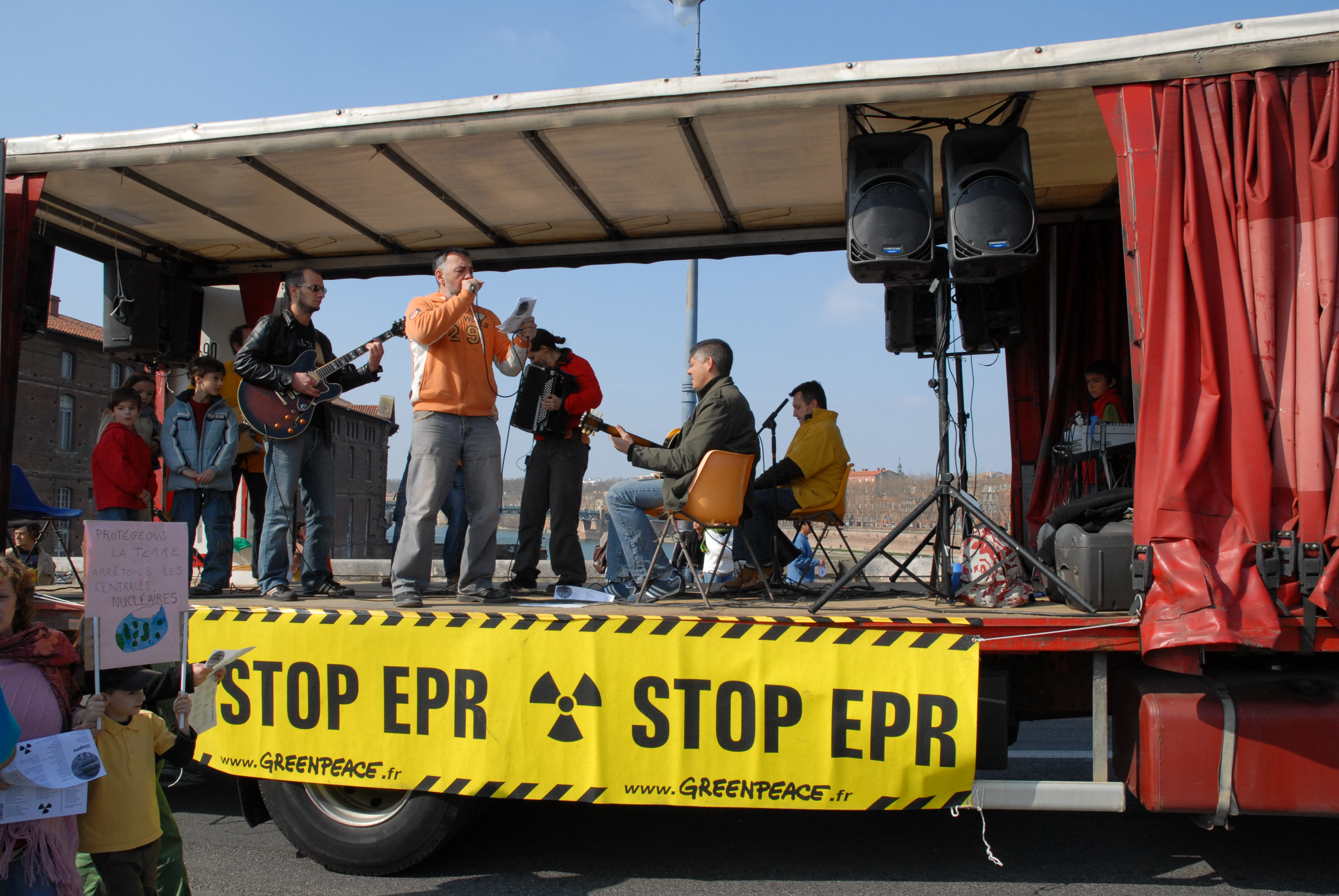
Greenpeace protest against new French nuclear plants (March 2007)

Following the 2011 Fukushima I nuclear accidents, an OpinionWay poll at the end of March found that 57% of the French population were opposed to nuclear energy in France. A TNS-Sofres poll in the days following the accident found 55% in favour of nuclear power. In 2006, BBC/GlobeScan poll found 57% of the French opposed to nuclear energy.

In May 2001, an Ipsos poll found that nearly 70% of the population had a 'good opinion' of nuclear power, however 56% also preferred not to live near a nuclear plant and the same proportion thought that a 'Chernobyl-like accident' could occur in France. The same Ipsos poll revealed that 50% thought that nuclear power was the best way of solving the problem of the greenhouse effect, while 88% thought this was a major reason for continuing to use nuclear power.

Historically the position has generally been favourable, with around two-thirds of the population strongly supporting nuclear power, while the Gaullists, the Socialist Party and the Communist Party were also all in favour.

When the Civaux Nuclear Power Plant was being constructed in 1997, it was claimed to be welcomed by the local community. A variety of reasons were cited for the popular support; a sense of national independence and reduced reliance on foreign oil, reduction of greenhouse gases, and a cultural interest in large technological projects (like the TGV, whose high-speed lines are powered by these plants, and Concorde).

=== Anti-nuclear movement ===
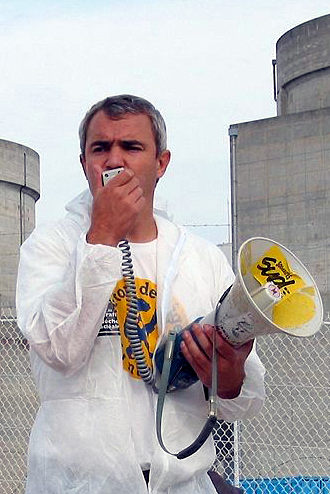
Stéphane Lhomme in front of Blayais' nuclear power station

In the 1970s, an anti-nuclear movement in France, consisting of citizens' groups and political action committees, emerged. Between 1975 and 1977, some 175,000 people protested against nuclear power in ten demonstrations.

On 18 January 1982, Swiss environmental activist Chaïm Nissim fired five rockets on the Superphénix nuclear plant, then under construction. The rockets were launched at the incomplete containment building and caused damage, missing the reactor's empty core.

In January 2004, up to 15,000 anti-nuclear protesters marched in Paris against a new generation of nuclear reactors, the European Pressurised Reactor (EPR). On 17 March 2007, simultaneous protests, organised by Sortir du nucléaire, were staged in five French towns to protest against the construction of EPR plants.

After Japan's 2011 Fukushima nuclear disaster, thousands staged anti-nuclear protests around France, demanding reactors be closed. Protesters' demands were focused on getting France to shut its oldest nuclear power station at Fessenheim. Many people also protested at the Cattenom Nuclear Power Plant, France's second most powerful.

In November 2011, thousands of anti-nuclear protesters delayed a train carrying radioactive waste from France to Germany. Many clashes and obstructions made the journey the slowest one since the annual shipments of radioactive waste began in 1995. Also in November 2011, a French court fined nuclear power giant Électricité de France €1.5m and jailed two senior employees for spying on Greenpeace, including hacking into Greenpeace's computer systems. Greenpeace was awarded €500,000 in damages.

On the first anniversary of the Fukushima nuclear disaster, organisers of French anti-nuclear demonstrations claim 60,000 supporters formed a human chain 230 kilometres long, stretching from Lyon to Avignon. Austrian Chancellor Werner Faymann expected anti-nuclear petition drives to start in at least six European Union countries in 2012 with the goal of having the EU abandon nuclear power.

In March 2014, police arrested 57 Greenpeace protesters who used a truck to break through security barriers and enter the Fessenheim nuclear in eastern France. The activists hung antinuclear banners, but France's nuclear safety authority said that the plant's security had not been compromised. Although President Hollande promised to close Fessenheim by 2016, this was delayed due to the late completion of Flamanville 3, with Fessenheim finally closed in June 2020.

=== Pro-nuclear movement ===
Voices of Nuclear (Voix du Nucléaire).

== Environmental impact ==
Nuclear waste facilities in France

In 2007, Areva NC claimed that, due to their reliance on nuclear power, France's carbon emissions per kWh are less than 1/10 that of Germany and the UK, and 1/13 that of Denmark, which has no nuclear plants. Its emissions of nitrogen oxide and sulfur dioxide have been reduced by 70% over 20 years, even though the total power output has tripled in that time.

If done without environmental or health over-sight, conventional mining for uranium can produce large amounts of mining tailings and contaminated water but as of 2010, about half of the world's uranium supply is increasingly generated from In situ recovery (ISR) technology, that does not require physical mining in the conventional sense and if responsibly operated is considerably cleaner. Another alternative to ISR is remote controlled underground mining, the French-owned Areva Resources Canada owns a large stake in the Canadian McArthur River uranium mine, the world's highest grade and largest uranium mine by output, the underground remote operation of mining vehicles in this mine, is designed to keep personnel exposure to rock particulates and radon gas etc. low. The mine is a frequent winner of the John T. Ryan National Safety Trophy award in Canada, which is bestowed upon the safest mine in the country every year.

According to the French embassy to the US, fission-electricity "helps to reduce French greenhouse gas emissions by avoiding the release of 31 billions tonnes of carbon dioxide (contrary to coal or gas generation) and making France the least carbon emitting country within the OECD". It further notes that, due to recycling of spent nuclear fuel, French fission-electric stations, produce 10 g/year/inhabitant of "nuclear waste", which is primarily fission products and other safety concerning solid decaying radioactive isotopes.

French environmentalist Bruno Comby started the group Environmentalists For Nuclear Energy in 1996, and said in 2005, "If well-managed, nuclear energy is very clean, does not create polluting gases in the atmosphere, produces very little waste and does not contribute to the greenhouse effect".

=== Air pollution ===
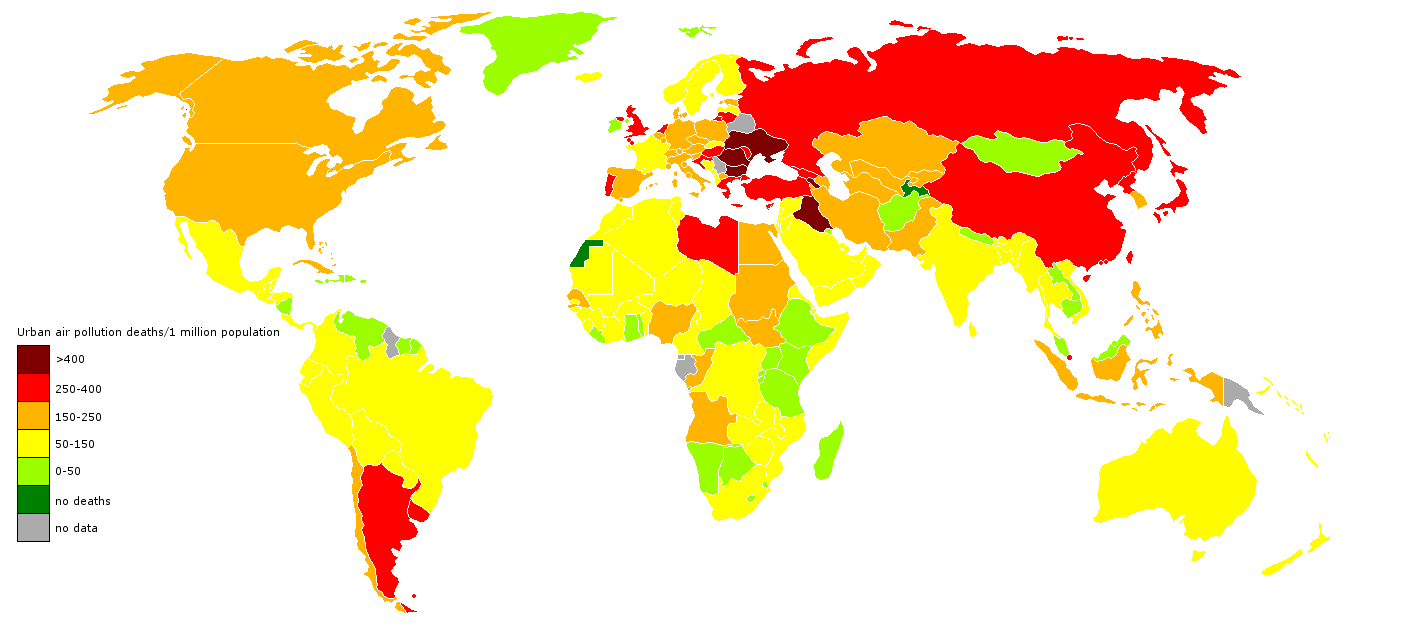
Deaths from air pollution in 2004. Despite a similar level of industrial activity and city dwelling as its immediate neighbors of Germany, Spain and Italy, France has a lower number of yearly deaths from air pollution when compared to every other mainland European nation.

While not a major concern at the time, the Messmer plan resulted in decreased air pollution and one of the lowest carbon dioxide emission ratios per unit of electricity produced among densely populated industrialized countries. Furthermore, the shift of domestic traffic from air to the TGV (which is powered by electricity) further aided in those goals.

Unlike its neighboring countries of Germany, Italy and the United Kingdom, France does not rely very much on fossil fuels and biomass for electricity or home heating thanks to an abundance of cheap nuclear power. Air pollution in France largely comes from cars and a minority is carried by the wind from Germany. Each year, the coal fired power stations in Germany are the cause of a calculated 1,860 premature domestic deaths and approximately 2,500 deaths abroad.

=== Electric vehicles ===
As the adoption of electric cars over internal combustion engine vehicles increases, France's comparatively cheap peak and off peak electricity prices could act as a strong customer incentive that may spur the speed of adoption of electric vehicles. This would essentially turn the current perceived glut of relatively cheap nuclear electricity into an asset, as demand for electric vehicle recharging stations becomes more and more commonplace.

Due to France's very low-carbon power electricity grid, the carbon dioxide emissions from charging an electric car from the French electricity grid are 12 g per km traveled. This compares favourably to the direct emissions of one of the most successful hybrid electric vehicles, the Toyota Prius, which produces carbon dioxide emissions at the higher rate of 105 g per km traveled.

== Fusion research ==
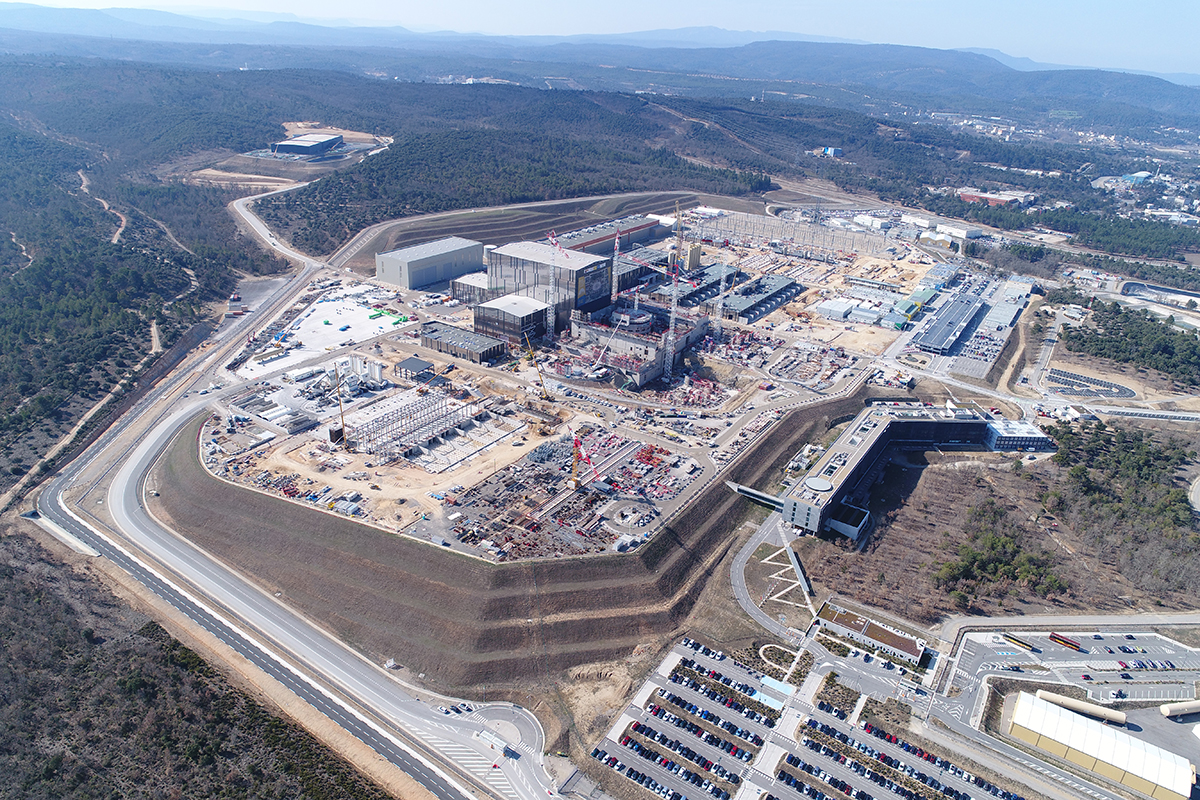
Aerial view of the ITER site in 2018

The nuclear fusion project ITER is constructing the world's largest and most advanced experimental tokamak nuclear fusion reactor in the south of France. A collaboration between the European Union (EU), India, Japan, China, Russia, South Korea and the United States, the project aims to make a transition from experimental studies of plasma physics to electricity-producing fusion power plants. In 2005, Greenpeace International issued a press statement criticizing government funding of the ITER, believing the money should have been diverted to renewable energy sources and claiming that fusion energy would result in nuclear waste and nuclear weapons proliferation issues. A French association including about 700 anti-nuclear groups, Sortir du nucléaire (Get Out of Nuclear Energy), claimed that ITER was a hazard because scientists did not yet know how to manipulate the high-energy deuterium and tritium used in the fusion process. According to most anti-nuclear groups, nuclear fusion power "remains a distant dream". The World Nuclear Association says that fusion "presents so far insurmountable scientific and engineering challenges". Construction of the ITER facility began in 2007, but the project has run into many delays and budget overruns. The facility is now not expected to begin operations until the year 2027 – 11 years after initially anticipated.

== See also ==
- List of nuclear reactors – France
- Politics of France
- Nuclear energy policy
- Death of Sébastien Briat
- World Nuclear Industry Status Report
- History of France's military nuclear program
- Uranium mining in France
- Nuclear waste management in France
