= Monique Sené =

French nuclear physicist

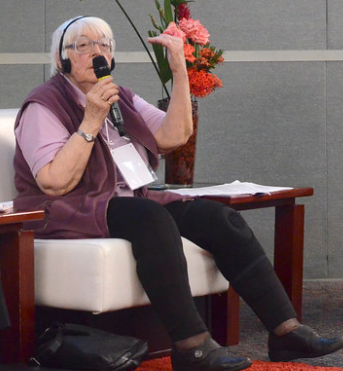
Monique Sené, circa 2015

Monique Sené (born February 14, 1936) (née Moirez) is a nuclear physicist and one of the co-founders of the Groupement des scientifiques pour l'information sur l'énergie nucléaire (GSIEN) (Association of Scientists for Information on Nuclear Energy) and its first president. As of March 2011 she was Honorary Research Director at the National Centre for Scientific Research and president of GSIEN. She is also Vice President of the Science Committee of Association Nationale des Comités et Commissions Locales d'Information (ANCCLI) (National Association of Local Information Committees and Commissions) and a member of ANCCLI's High Committee for Transparency and Information on Nuclear Safety.

Although she is not an opponent of nuclear power per se, Sené is a high-profile critic of the French nuclear power programme due to concerns about its safety, the handling of nuclear waste and its imposition without public debate. She worked on high energy physics at the École Polytechnique at the time of GSIEN's foundation.

In 1998 Monique Sené was awarded by Dominique Voynet the rank of Chevalier of the National Order of the Legion of Honour for her work as anti–nuclear power activist.

== See also ==
- Anti-nuclear movement in France
- Non-nuclear future
- Mycle Schneider
