= Sortir du nucléaire =

Sortir du nucléaire (French for "nuclear phase-out") is the name of several organisations:

- Sortir du nucléaire (Canada)
- Sortir du nucléaire (France)
