= Groupement des scientifiques pour l'information sur l'énergie nucléaire =

The Groupement des scientifiques pour l'information sur l'énergie nucléaire GSIEN (Association of Scientists for Information on Nuclear Energy) is a multidisciplinary not-for-profit association of independent scientists who aim to spread information about the nuclear industry in France founded on December 15, 1975.

In addition to providing a structure within which independent evaluations can take place, GSIEN aims to ensure that the French nuclear industry, one of the World's largest, provides open and honest information.

In 1977 GSIEN was first to provide an explanation of the causes and consequences of the Three Mile Island accident, while the authorities tried to play-down the incident, however GSIEN came to prominence at the time of the 1986 Chernobyl disaster when the press and public found that their independent information helped to compensate for the shortcomings in the official information. They subsequently became widely recognised after many of their members contributed to various overseas projects.

== History ==
GSIEN was founded in the wake of the launch in 1974 of the Messmer Plan to switch all of France's electricity generation to nuclear power, which took place without public or parliamentary debate. The announcement of the Messmer Plan caused a split in the scientific community between those physicists (generally older) who favoured the plan, and those (generally younger) who were concerned about the potential risks, leading to l’Appel des 400 (the appeal of the 400), a petition signed initially by over 400 scientists, and ultimately by around 4,000, expressing their concern over a number of issues including 'secrecy' and 'official propaganda'. GSIEN was created following this petition, inspired in part by model of the Union of Concerned Scientists in the United States, with the objective of disseminating information to 'prevent nuclear officials from turning information into propaganda'.

In 1998 Monique Sené, nuclear physicist, one of GSIEN's co-founders and its president, was awarded the National Order of the Legion of Honour for her work as anti–nuclear power activist.

== Activities ==
=== Publications ===
Since its first edition in June 1976, GSIEN has published over 250 editions of its quarterly newsletter, la Gazette Nucléaire (the Nuclear Gazette).

GSIEN has also published a number of books including Electro-nucléaire : danger (1977, ISBN 978-2-02-004711-1), Plutonium Sur Rhône (1981, ISBN 978-2-901968-47-4)

=== Technical expertise ===
GSIEN members have been invited by several Local Information Commissions to participate in a number of 10-yearly nuclear plant inspections, including those at Fessenheim, Golfech Nuclear Power Plant and Blayais Nuclear Power Plant, as well as in a various other assessments.

== See also ==
- Nuclear power in France
- Anti-nuclear movement in France
