= Fessenheim Nuclear Power Plant =

Nuclear power station in France

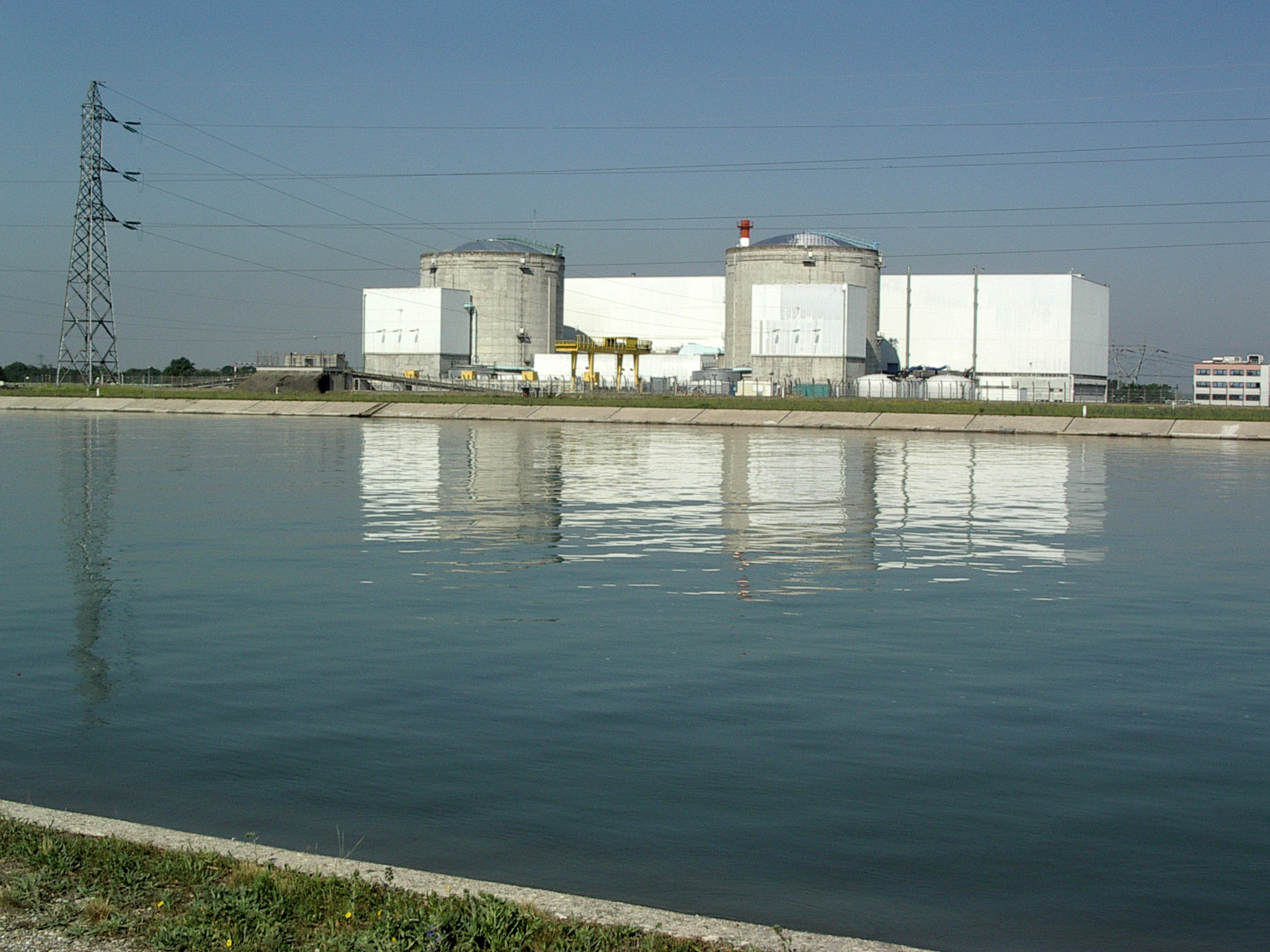
- Fessenheim Nuclear Power Plant
- Official name: Centrale nucléaire de Fessenheim
- Country: France
- Location: Fessenheim
- Coordinates: 47°54′11″N 7°33′47″E
- Status: Decommissioned
- Construction began: 1970
- Commission date: 1 January 1978; 48 years ago
- Decommission date: 29 June 2020; 6 years ago
- Owners: EnBW; Électricité de France
- Operator: EDF

Nuclear power station
- Reactor type: PWR

Power generation
- Units operational: 2 × 920 MW
- Nameplate capacity: 1840 MW
- Capacity factor: 72.5%
- Annual net output: 11,679 GW·h

External links
- Website: www.edf.fr/de/groupe-edf/nos-energies/carte-de-nos-implantations-industrielles-en-france/das-kernkraftwerk-fessenheim/vorstellung
- Commons: Related media on Commons

The Fessenheim Nuclear Power Plant is located in the Fessenheim commune in the Haut-Rhin department in Grand Est in north-eastern France, 15 km (9.3 mi) north east of the Mulhouse urban area, within 1.5 km (0.93 mi) of the border with Germany, and approximately 40 km (25 mi) from Switzerland. Unit 1 was closed in February 2020 and unit 2 on 29 June 2020.

== Description ==
The Fessenheim plant has two pressurized water reactors, which each generated 920 MWe. Construction at Fessenheim began in 1970 and the plant was commissioned in 1977. It is built alongside the Grand Canal d'Alsace, a canal channelling the Upper Rhine river, from which it drew 2.5 km^{3} (0.60 mi^{3}) of cooling water annually.

The plant employed around 700 staff and 200 contractors, and indirectly supports a further 600 to 2,000 people during maintenance operations. The plant contributed around 16,000,000 euro in tax to the various local authorities, including providing the commune of Fessenheim with 70% of its revenue.

In October 2009 the plant's third 10-yearly inspection on reactor 1 began, in advance of a decision on whether the plant could continue to operate for a further decade. A full decision was made in 2011, with permission to operate reactor 1 given. Reactor 1 was permanently shut down on February 22, 2020. The second reactor was inspected in mid April 2011. The local Information and Oversight Commission asked GSIEN to conduct a parallel independent inspection alongside the official inspection by the Nuclear Safety Authority. Reactor 2 shut down on 29 June 2020.

== Technical data ==
Unit	Type / Model	Net Capacity	Gross Capacity	Thermal Capacity	Construction Start	First Criticality	Grid Connection	Commercial Operation	Permanent Shutdown
Fessen- heim 1	PWR / CP0	880 MW	920 MW	2785 MW	1971-09-01	1977-02-07	1977-04-06	1978-01-01	2020-02-22
Fessen- heim 2	PWR / CP0	880 MW	920 MW	2785 MW	1972-02-01	1977-06-27	1977-10-07	1978-04-01	2020-06-30

== Selected incidents and accidents ==
- On April 9, 2014, a tank on the non-nuclear equipment cooling system was accidentally overfilled due to incorrect level indicators. As the overflow drain pipe on this tank was blocked near ground level and could not drain the overflow water as designed, the overflowing water from this tank backed up through multiple other pipes and eventually began overflowing into a room next to Unit 1's control room. The failure of several supposedly water-tight seals between floors allowed the leaking water to descend into lower levels, eventually encountering and shorting out electrical equipment used for some of the nuclear control systems. One of the two redundant reactor protection system trains became unavailable due to the water damage, and the reactor control rod visual position indicators were totally disabled. Although by this point the water leak had already been stopped, the loss of the reactor control rod visual position indicators meant that the reactor could not be shut down via normal control rod operation, and would need to be shut down through an alternate system (either via an uncontrolled emergency drop of the safety shutdown rods or by utilizing the boron injection system). The operators on duty chose to slowly bring the reactor to a normal shutdown via the use of the boron injection system (which was permitted under normal operation rules), and the reactor reached a "maintenance cold shutdown" state on April 11, 2014. This event was rated at 'level 1' on the International Nuclear Event Scale (INES). Following the repair, testing, and recertification of all damaged equipment, Unit 1 was subsequently reconnected to the grid on May 28, 2014.
- On September 5, 2012, two employees were mildly injured by a steam release caused by a minor chemical accident which also triggered fire alarms at the plant.
- On April 10, 2011, operator error led to one of the reactors automatically shutting down. The incident had no further consequences and was rated at 'level 1' on the International Nuclear Event Scale (INES).
- On December 27, 2009, a 'level 1' incident on the INES occurred when plant matter was drawn into the Essential Service Water System intake, reducing the flow rate, although the flow remained sufficient to avoid endangering the security of the plant.
- On January 24, 2004, the water in the primary circuit water of Unit 1 was contaminated by radioactive resin from a system used to filter out boron, quickly blocking several filters and endangering the integrity of the joints on the pumps. Seven EDF employees inhaled radioactive dust during the replacement of the filters, and another was slightly irradiated during the clean-up the following month. The incident was categorised at 'level 1' on the INES.

== Risks ==
Due to its location, the Fessenheim plant is subject to particular risks from seismic activity and flooding, and there is an ongoing debate about the adequacy of its design in these respects.

=== Seismicity ===
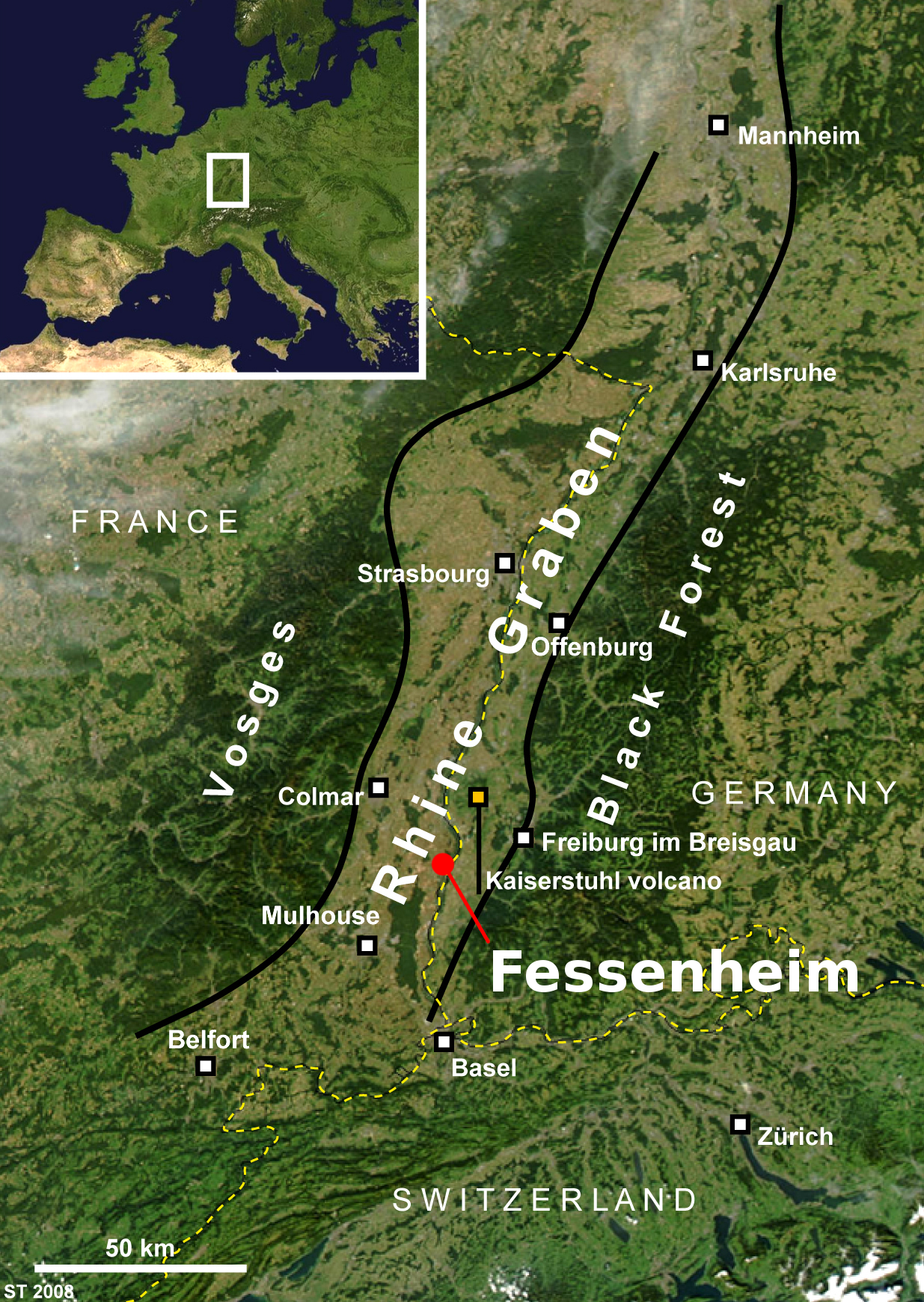
Fessenheim's location in the Rhine Rift Valley near the fault that caused the 1356 Basel earthquake has led to safety concerns.

The majority of the Haut-Rhin département, including Fessenheim, is classified as being in a zone of moderate seismicity; the southern third is in a medium-risk zone. The most recent earthquake in this zone, with a magnitude of 3.9, took place on Saturday, 10 September 2022, 1.2 km from Flaxlanden (epicenter 47.693°N 7.359°E with a 8.9 km depth). Previously an earthquake of magnitude 4.7, was recorded in this southern third at Sierentz in July 1980. The last major earthquake in the region was the 1356 Basel earthquake, estimated to have had a M_{w} magnitude of up to 7.1.

A report commissioned by the Swiss canton of Basel-Stadt, published in 2007, concluded that the previous seismic evaluations undertaken by both EDF and, to a lesser extent, by the Institut de radioprotection et de sûreté nucléaire (Radioprotection and Nuclear Safety Institute, IRSN) had underestimated the risks involved. In particular, although the location of the fault in the Rhine Rift Valley that led to the 1356 Basel earthquake was sufficiently well known for national and regional purposes, its location was not known precisely enough to evaluate a particular site. Studies conducted by other scientists have, for example, reached different conclusions about which faults might have been involved in the 1356 earthquake, its magnitude (ranging from 6.0 to 7.1 on the moment magnitude scale), and the distance from the fault to the plant (ranging from 2 km (1.2 mi) to 40 km (25 mi) away, compared to the distances of 34 km (21 mi) and 29 km (18 mi) used by EDF and the IRSN respectively). EDF also failed to take into account the possibility of a moderate local earthquake, which may have the potential to do greater damage than one which is larger but more distant, and the report was also critical of some aspects of the RFS 2001-01 assessment requirements. The report found that the design standards in force when the plant was built were similar to those that apply to present-day public buildings: the plant had been designed to accommodate movement, but it was not possible to determine whether or not the safety margins used would be adequate if a more realistic seismic evaluation were to be used.

On March 11, 2011, the local Information and Oversight Commission announced that it was commissioning two independent second opinions, to be delivered as soon as possible, one on 'the safety of the plant in the event of an earthquake of magnitude 7.2, corresponding to the new seismic reference point proposed by the Swiss experts', the other on the 'redundancy of the cooling systems' in case of flooding. GSIEN has been commissioned to produce one of the reports.

=== Flood ===
Although situated around 8 m (26 ft) below the level of the adjacent Grand Canal d'Alsace, it is not clear whether, taking into account the calculation methods in the 1960s, the design took adequate account the consequences of a breach in the canal. In its initial report following the 1999 Blayais Nuclear Power Plant flood, the Institute for Nuclear Protection and Safety (now part of the Radioprotection and Nuclear Safety Institute) called for the risk of flooding at Fessenheim to be re-examined due to the presence of the canal.

On March 11, 2011, the local Information and Oversight Commission announced that it had commissioned an urgent report on the 'redundancy of the cooling systems' in case of flooding and that another report 'to determine the areas to strengthen to guarantee the safety of the plant in the event of a breach in the canal', which had already started, was expected in June 2011.

=== Aquifer ===
The station is built on top of a large aquifer (French Fossé rhénan, German Oberrhein-Aquifer), contamination of which would be very harmful. A concrete slab is built below the reactor in order to reduce the risk of polluting the aquifer.

=== Cooling water ===
In August 2018, the plant was shut down during a heat wave to ensure that cooling water being released into the nearby river did not overheat it.

== Opposition ==
Opposition to the Fessenheim plant dates back to the 1970s when its construction was proposed, and in June 1977 the pirate radio station Radio Verte Fessenheim (Green Radio Fessenheim) began broadcasting against the plant.

There have been concerns about the seismic safety of the plant and, following the 2011 Fukushima I nuclear accidents, on March 21 the local Information and Oversight Commission for the plant called for the seismic risk to be re-evaluated based on a 7.2 magnitude earthquake; the plant was originally designed for a 6.7 magnitude earthquake. The Swiss cantons of Basel-Stadt, Basel-Landschaft and Jura have also said that they are going to ask the French government to suspend the operation of Fessenheim while undertaking a safety review based on the lessons learned from Japan. The German state of Baden-Württemberg has called for a temporary closure in line with the 3-month shutdown of pre-1981 plants ordered in Germany. On March 29 the Franche-Comté Regional Council went further and voted for the plant to be closed, the first time a French Regional Council has passed such a vote. On April 6 the Grand Council of Basel-Stadt also voted for the plant to be closed as did the council of the Urban Community of Strasbourg on April 12. The European Parliament's Green members also supported the closure demands and referred the matter to the European Commission. Around 3,800 people demonstrated near the plant on April 8; a larger demonstration is expected on April 25. The group Stop Fessenheim have collected over 63,000 signatures through an online petition calling for Fessenheim's closure, and, on April 18, began a 366-day 'fasting relay' outside the préfecture office in Colmar.

Although the plant was built with a 40-year operational life, on the plant's 30th anniversary, the anti nuclear group sortir du nucléaire called for the plant's immediate closure. The Tri-national Nuclear Protection Action Group ATPN (Action Tri nationale de Protection Nucléaire), with members from France, Germany and Switzerland also campaigned for the plant to be closed and in 2008 unsuccessfully applied to the Strasbourg Administrative Tribunal (Tribunal Administratif de Strasbourg) to order its closure. On March 9, 2011, a further application to close the plant because of the seismic, flooding and other risks was rejected by the tribunal.

A local association called Stop Fessenheim was formed in October 2005 and registered in the Canton of Munster, after having operated informally since 2004.

The Fessenheim plant is one in a group of French nuclear power plants opposed by neighbouring countries, the other plants being Cattenom and Bugey.

== Attacks and sabotage ==
On May 3, 1975, two bombs exploded at the Fessenheim Nuclear Power Plant, which was still under construction. This caused damage and delayed the completion of the plant. No one was injured. The bombing was claimed by a group named "Commando Puig Antich – Ulrike Meinhof".

On the evening of June 2, 1980, unidentified people drove up to the gate of the power plant and fired guns at the guards. None of the guards were hit.

== Closure announcements ==
After his victory in the 2012 Presidential Election, François Hollande confirmed his plan to close the plant in 2017. In September 2012, he ordered to close the plant by the end of 2016. In September 2015, Ségolène Royal (Minister of Ecology, Sustainable Development and Energy since April 2014), said a closure before the end of the term of François Hollande (that ends in May 2017) would furthermore be her intention. Royal has suggested turning the plant into a Tesla factory. In June 2016, EDF demanded a settlement from the State for compensation. On 24 August 2016, Le Monde wrote that a settlement has been stipulated. On 9 April 2017, the plant was ordered to close after the Flamanville 3 unit comes online, expected to begin operation in late 2018, later reported to 2019, keeping the French nuclear generation capacity below the legal limit of 63.2 GWe.

In November 2018, President Macron announced that both units would close in early 2020, which was refined in 2019 to unit 1 in February 2020 and unit 2 in June 2020.

Representatives of the international and French nuclear industry spoke out against the closure. The World Nuclear Association and the Director General of the Société française d’énergie nucléaire argued that low-emission energy from Fessenheim will be replaced by energy generated by fossil fuel plants.

== Popular culture ==
- In the 1976 American film The Enforcer, the third in the Dirty Harry film series, two bombs are said to have exploded at the Fessenheim Nuclear Power Plant.

== See also ==
- Nuclear power in France
- Anti-nuclear movement in France
- 1999 Blayais Nuclear Power Plant flood
- 2011 Fukushima I nuclear accidents
