= Grand Canal of Alsace =

Canal in eastern France

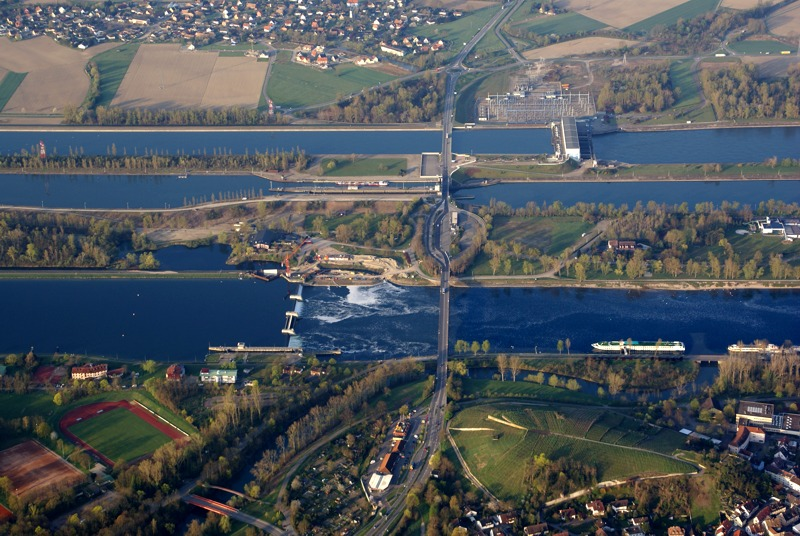
- The Rhine and the canal at Breisach
- Interactive map of Grand Canal of Alsace

Specifications
- Length: 50 km (31 mi)
- Locks: 4

History
- Date of first use: 1932
- Date completed: 1959

Geography
- Start point: Kembs
- End point: Vogelgrun
- Beginning coordinates: 47°37′00″N 7°34′15″E
- Ending coordinates: 48°01′59″N 7°34′04″E

The Grand Canal of Alsace (French: Grand Canal d'Alsace [ɡʁɑ̃ kanal dalzas]; German: Rheinseitenkanal [ˈʁɪnzaɪtn̩kaˌnaːl]) is a canal in Alsace, eastern France, channeling the Upper Rhine river. It is 50 kilometers (about 30 miles) long between Kembs and Vogelgrun, and provides access to the region from the Rhine River, Basel in Switzerland, and the North Sea for barges of up to about 5000 metric tons. The Grand Canal permits the navigation of more than 30,000 boats a year between Basel and Strasbourg.

Construction of the canal began in 1932 and was completed in 1959. The canal diverts much of the water from the original bed of the fast-flowing Rhine in this area, which is almost entirely unnavigable by boats.

The Grand Canal produces hydroelectric power at Kembs, Ottmarsheim, Fessenheim and Vogelgrun, supplying electricity to one of the most heavily industrialized regions in France and even to Germany. Furthermore, the canal provides enough water throughout the year to a nuclear power plant at Fessenheim, eliminating the need for water towers.

== See also ==
- Fessenheim Nuclear Power Plant - built alongside the canal
