= Association Nationale des Comités et Commissions Locales d'Information =

- Abbreviation: ANCCLI
- Predecessor: Association Nationale des Commissions Locales d'Information (ANCLI)
- Formation: 25 September 2000
- Type: Association
- Purpose: Coordination of local information and oversight committees for nuclear installations
- Headquarters: Paris, France
- Region served: France
- Official language: French
- Website: www.anccli.fr

The Association Nationale des Comités et Commissions Locales d'Information (ANCCLI), (National Association of Local Information Committees and Commissions), known until 2010 as the Association Nationale des Commissions Locales d'Information (ANCLI) (National Association of Local Information Committees) is a national association in France that brings together the local bodies that have been set up with the dual roles of providing information and oversight of nuclear installations. ANCLI was founded on September 25, 2000, by the Office of the Presidents of the Local Information Committees in order to express their views on the national and international stage.

In addition to making its voice heard on a range of matters including transparency, the transport of nuclear materials, nuclear waste, nuclear decommissioning, environmental monitoring, plant ageing and the like, the Association also aims to promote the exchange of experiences and sharing of information between its members, provides logistical support, carries out studies and publishes reports, and maintains relationships with key national and international bodies.
