= Death of Sébastien Briat =

French anti-nuclear activist (d. 2004)

Sébastien Briat was an anti-nuclear activist from Meuse, France who gained international media attention in 2004 when he was struck and killed by a train carrying nuclear waste near Avricourt, France, after preparing to chain himself to the tracks while participating in a protest against nuclear power. Briat was 21 years old at the time. A local Green leader highlighted the wider significance of the incident as an illustration of the protestors' security and safety concerns relating to the transport: "A train could hit something at any moment, and there's nothing that the SNCF nor the organisations which are meant to provide security can do about it."

The train was carrying 12 containers of waste from German nuclear power plants, which had been reprocessed in France, and was heading to Gorleben, Germany for storage. Germany has an agreement with France which allows Germany to send its nuclear waste to France for reprocessing, as long as Germany takes it back afterward for storage. Briat was one of at least 4,500 people who attended the protest, which The New York Times said was "prompted by concerns about the safety of the nuclear material."

According to The New York Times, Briat was "surprised by the train." The train's conductor hit the brakes as soon as he saw Briat, but because of momentum, was not able to stop the train in time to prevent it from hitting him. Briat's leg was severed by the train. As he did not die immediately, paramedics started to take him to the hospital, but he died before reaching the hospital.

Afterwards, it was reported that Briat had violated a number of key safety rules that protesters normally followed. It was reported among others that "Briat had chained himself shortly after a curve in the track, behind a hill, near a forest, which made it impossible for the conductor to see him in time to stop. In addition, Briat did not wait for the train to stop before chaining himself to the track. Finally, Briat did not have other protesters stationed further down the tracks to alert the conductor with smoke signals. More experienced protesters normally take safety precautions to avoid these mistakes."

After Briat's death, anti-nuclear activists canceled similar protests along the same train route.

== See also ==
- Anti-nuclear movement in France
- Anti-nuclear movement in Germany
