= Fessenheim =

Commune in Grand Est, France

Fessenheim Fassene (Alsatian)
- Commune
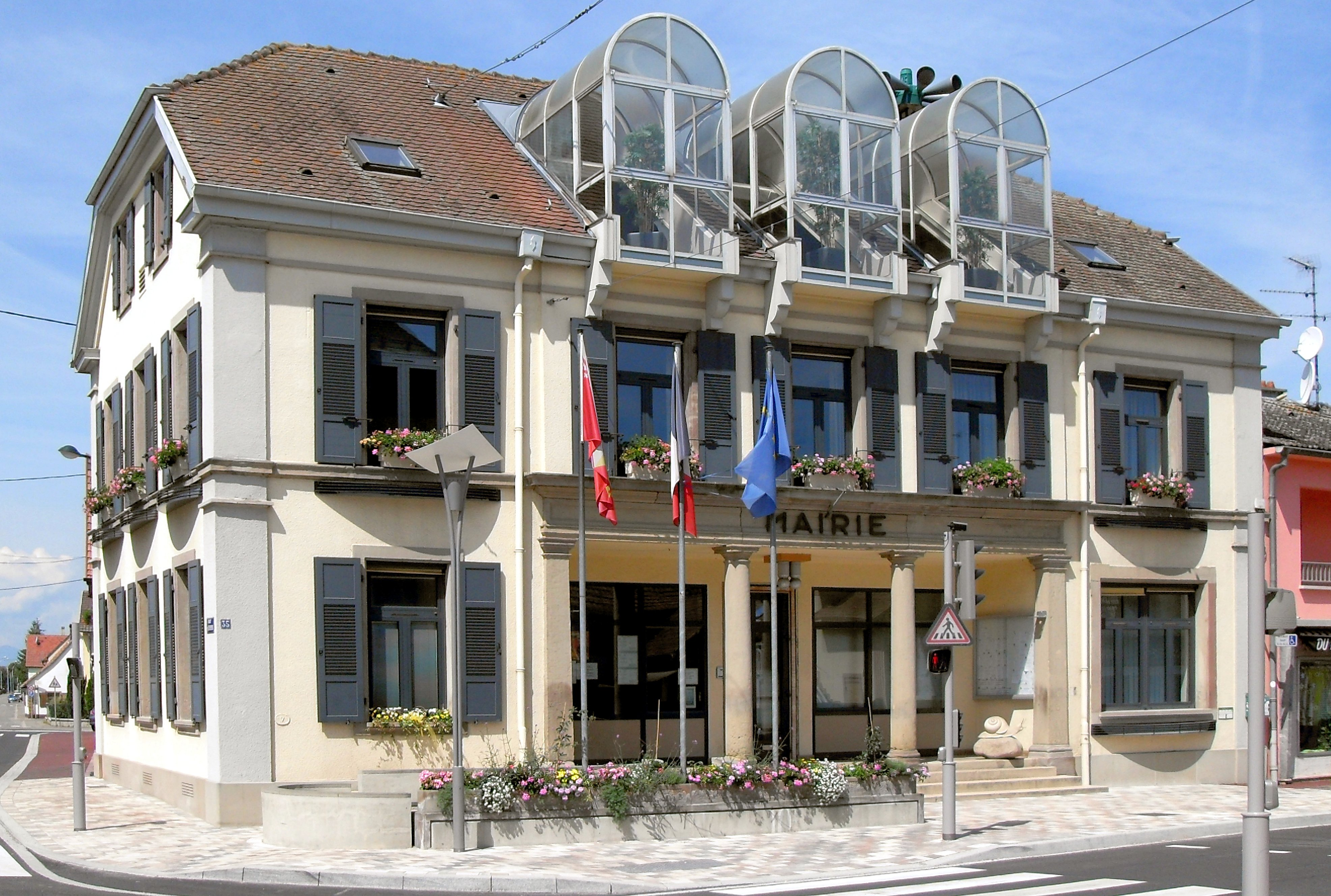
- The town hall in Fessenheim

- Coat of arms
- Location of Fessenheim
- Location within France Location within Grand Est
- Coordinates: 47°54′56″N 7°32′12″E
- Country: France
- Region: Grand Est
- Department: Haut-Rhin
- Arrondissement: Colmar-Ribeauvillé
- Canton: Ensisheim

Government
  - Mayor (2020–2026): Claude Brender
- Area^{1}: 18.4 km^{2} (7.1 sq mi)
- Elevation: 205 m (673 ft)
- Highest elevation: 215 m (705 ft)
- Lowest elevation: 201 m (659 ft)
- Population (2023): 2,345
  - Density: 127/km^{2} (330/sq mi)
- Time zone: UTC+01:00 (CET)
  - Summer (DST): UTC+02:00 (CEST)
- INSEE/Postal code: 68091 /68740
- ^{1} French Land Register data, which excludes lakes, ponds, glaciers > 1 km^{2} (0.386 sq mi or 247 acres) and river estuaries.

Fessenheim (French pronunciation: [fɛsənaim]; Alsatian: Fassene) is a commune in the Haut-Rhin department in Grand Est in north-eastern France.

It is known for:

- its hydroelectric power plant on the Grand Canal d'Alsace (built 1953–1956, inaugurated 1957);
- the Fessenheim Nuclear Power Plant next to the Grand Canal d'Alsace, formerly the oldest in service in France since 1977 until it shut down in 2020;
- a road and pedestrian bridge over the Rhine (210 m long, 7 m wide) to Hartheim in Germany since 2006;
- the Victor Schœlcher museum, honoring the 19th Century Abolitionist Victor Schœlcher whose father, Marc Schœlcher, was born in Fessenheim.

== Population ==
Historical population
Year	Pop.	±% p.a.
1968	896	—
1975	1,653	+9.14%
1982	2,002	+2.77%
1990	2,000	−0.01%
1999	2,097	+0.53%
2007	2,250	+0.88%
2012	2,288	+0.34%
2017	2,353	+0.56%
2023	2,345	−0.06%
Source: INSEE

== See also ==
- Communes of the Haut-Rhin département
- Fessenheim-le-Bas
- Raymond Couvègnes
