= Blayais Nuclear Power Plant =

Nuclear power plant located near Blaye, France

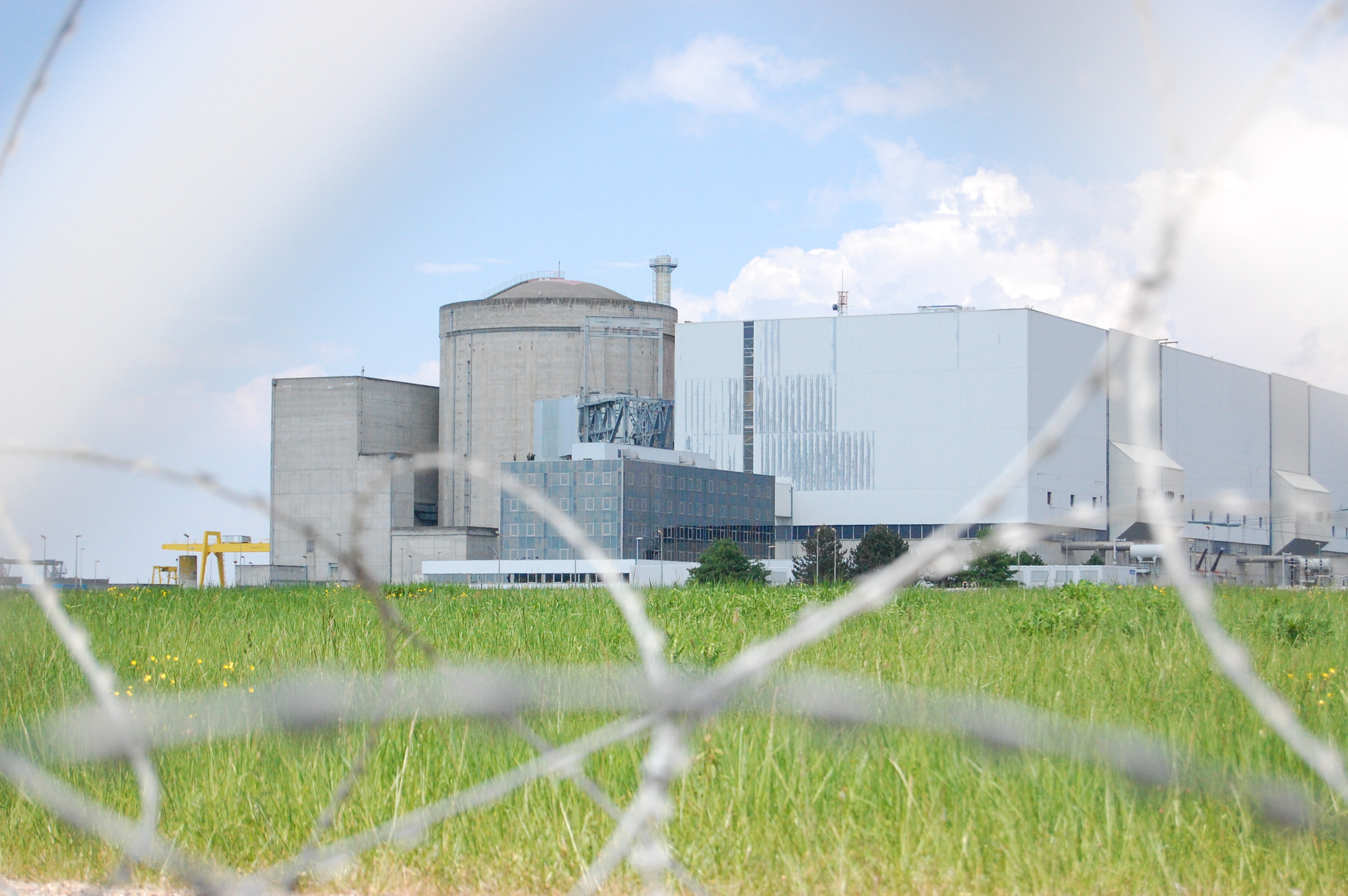
- Official name: Centrale nucléaire du Blayais
- Country: France
- Location: Blaye, Gironde, Nouvelle-Aquitaine
- Coordinates: 45°15′21″N 0°41′35″W
- Status: Operational
- Construction began: Units 1–2: 1 January 1977; Units 3–4: 1 April 1978
- Commission date: Unit 1: 1 December 1981; Unit 2: 1 February 1983; Unit 3: 14 November 1983; Unit 4: 1 October 1983
- Owner: EDF
- Operator: EDF

Nuclear power station
- Reactor type: PWR
- Reactor supplier: Framatome
- Cooling source: Gironde estuary
- Thermal capacity: 4 × 2785 MW_{th}

Power generation
- Units operational: 4 × 910 MW
- Make and model: CP1
- Nameplate capacity: 3640 MW
- Capacity factor: 82.73% (2017); 75.15% (lifetime)
- Annual net output: 26,380 GWh (2017)

External links
- Website: Centrale nucléaire du Blayais
- Commons: Related media on Commons

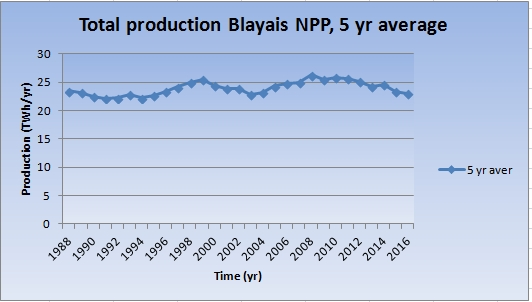
Production Blayais NPP, 5 yr average (TWh/yr)

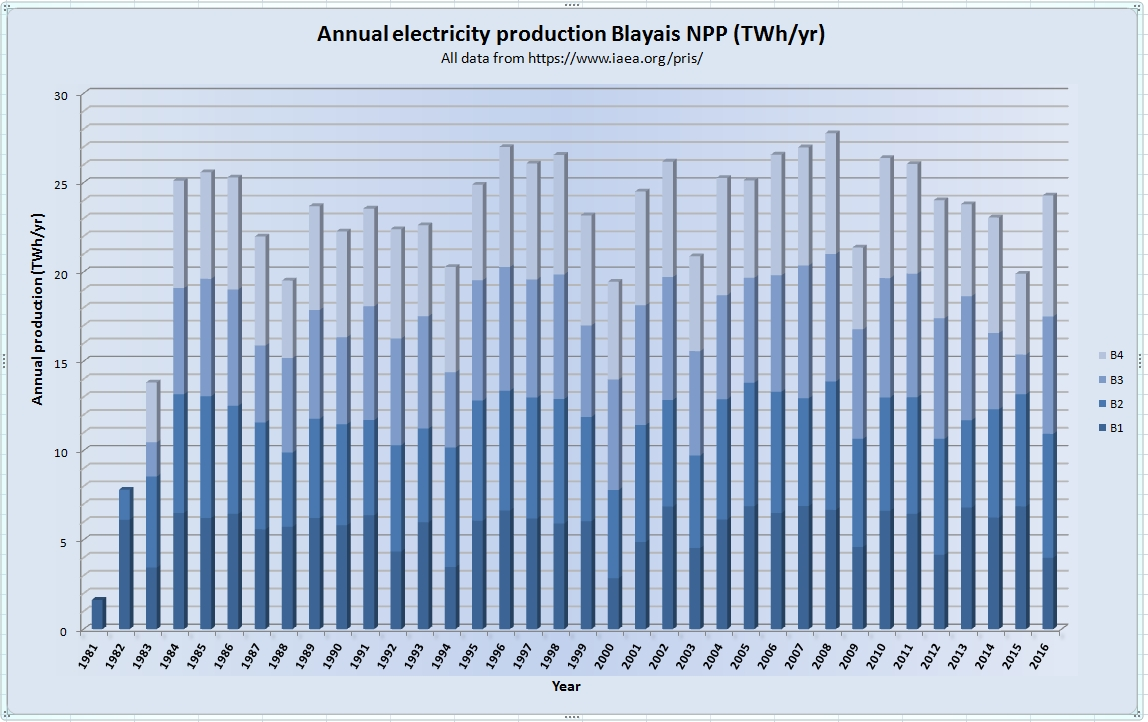
Blayais NPP production 1981-2016 (based upon IAEA PRIS data)

The Blayais Nuclear Power Plant is a nuclear power plant on the banks of the Gironde estuary near Blaye, France operated by Électricité de France.

== Description ==
The power plant has 4 pressurized water reactors – producing 951 MW gross and 910 MW net each. They were commissioned from 1981 to 1983. As of 2013, the plant had around 1300 EDF employees and 700 workers employed by subcontractors.

The four reactors produce about 25 TWh per year which is about 5% of the total electricity consumption in France (2015: 476 TWh). Since its commissioning and up to 2024, the Blayais nuclear power plant has produced around 1000 TWh.

== Selected incidents ==
=== 1999 flooding ===
On the evening of 27 December 1999, a combination of the incoming tide and high winds during extratropical storm Martin overwhelmed the sea walls at the plant and causing parts of the plant to be flooded. The event resulted in the loss of the plant's off-site power supply and knocked out several safety-related backup systems, resulting in a 'level 2' event on the International Nuclear Event Scale.

At the time, units 1, 2 and 4 were at full power, while unit 3 was shut down for refuelling. The operation of units 1 and 2 were affected by flood damage to a number of water pumps and distribution panels, all four units lost their 225 kV power supplies, while units 2 and 4 also lost their 400 kV power supplies. Diesel backup generators were employed to maintain power to plants 2 and 4 until the 400 kV supply was restored. Over the following days an estimated 90,000 m^{3} (3,200,000 cu ft) of water was pumped out of the flooded buildings.

On 5 January, the regional newspaper Sud-Ouest ran the following headline without being contradicted: "Very close to a major accident", explaining that a catastrophe had been narrowly avoided.

The flooding resulted in fundamental changes to the evaluation of flood risk at nuclear power plants, and in the precautions taken.

In Germany the flooding prompted the Federal Ministry for Environment, Nature Conservation and Nuclear Safety to order an evaluation of the German nuclear power plants.

== Opposition ==
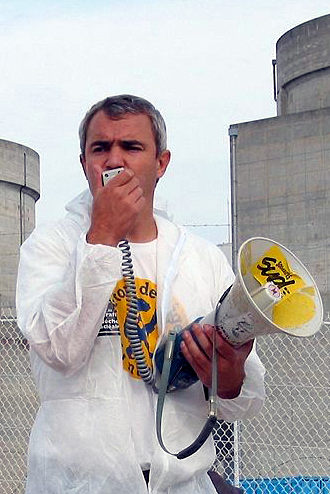
Stéphane Lhomme in front of Blayais' Nuclear power station

The continued operation of the Blayais plant is opposed by the local anti-nuclear group 'TchernoBlaye' (a portmanteau of the French spelling of Chernobyl and Blaye, the nearest town), formed by Stéphane Lhomme on 15 December 1999.

== See also ==
- Nuclear power in France
