= Stéphane Lhomme =

French activist (born 1965)

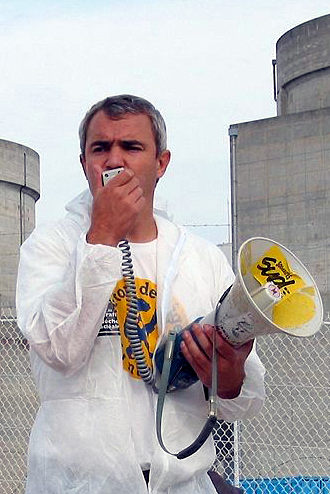
Stéphane Lhomme in front of Blayais' nuclear power station

Stéphane Lhomme (French pronunciation: [stefan lɔm]; born 4 November 1965 in Bordeaux) is a French activist. He is president of Tchernoblaye association, and was spokesperson of "Sortir du nucléaire" Network from 2002 to 2010.

Stéphane Lhomme was arrested in May 2006 and in April 2008 by French police for allegedly leaking a confidential report saying that the French nuclear reactor EPR would not resist to an airplane crash.
