= Chaïm Nissim =

Swiss environmental activist and politician (1949–2017)

- חיים ניסים

Member of the Grand Council of Geneva
- In office 1985 – 26 January 1989
- Succeeded by: Max Schneider
- In office 1993 – 21 September 2000
- Succeeded by: Morgane Gauthier

Personal details
- Born: 21 November 1949 Jerusalem
- Died: 11 April 2017 (aged 67) Geneva, Switzerland
- Party: Green Party of Switzerland
- Spouse: "a Swiss woman"
- Children: Sylvia (1986); Yael (1988); Talia (1995)
- Education: EPFL, Electronic and computer engineering
- Known for: rocket attack on the Superphénix nuclear plant

Chaïm Nissim (Hebrew: חיים ניסים; 21 November 1949 – 11 April 2017) was an Israeli-born militant ecological activist, and a Green Party of Switzerland politician. He was the perpetrator of a rocket attack on the Superphénix nuclear plant, on 18 January 1982.

== Biography ==
Chaïm Nissim was born in Jerusalem in 1949. He was raised and studied in Israel up to the age of 14, when his father was appointed director of an Israeli bank and his family moved to Geneva, Switzerland. Nissim obtained a degree in electronical and computer engineering at the EPFL in 1973.

=== Activist background and attack on Superphénix ===
For ten years, Nissim, believing that fast breeder reactor "can explode with their fast neutrons", did everything he could to stop the construction of the Superphénix nuclear plant, including training himself for underground guerilla, notably sabotaging electricity pylons with explosives.

On 18 January 1982, Nissim fired five rockets on the Superphénix nuclear plant, then under construction. Five rocket-propelled grenades were launched at the incomplete containment building – two hit and caused damage, missing the reactor's empty core.

The weapon, a RPG-7, was obtained from the Red Army Faction through Carlos the Jackal and the Belgian Communist Combatant Cells.

Nissim states that:

I know that it might sound odd to consider rockets as a non-violent mean of action. However, we took every imaginable precaution to be certain that no worker was at risk of being hit, therefore we committed a non-violent attack.

However, the plant manager disagreed with the previous statement, saying that the twenty workers on site were put in danger and that one rocket landed 20 meters away from a worker.

Nissim further stated:

These attacks were part of a general movement in which each little piece had its importance. People fired rockets, myself for instance. We had found a bazooka by German terrorists and we fired it. We failed, as the closest rocket missed the important part that we targeted by one metre. It was nevertheless quite beautiful. And, symbolically, it was a token contribution to the larger movement.

=== Political career ===
In 1985, Chaïm Nissim was elected member of the Grand Council of Geneva, under the aegis of the Green Party of Switzerland. He held the position until 2001.

On 8 May 2003, Nissim went public about the rocket attack of 1982, publishing a book on the subject and his connections to terrorist groups.

Nissim supported the association NOÉ21, a think tank on energy policies.
