= Sortir du nucléaire (France) =

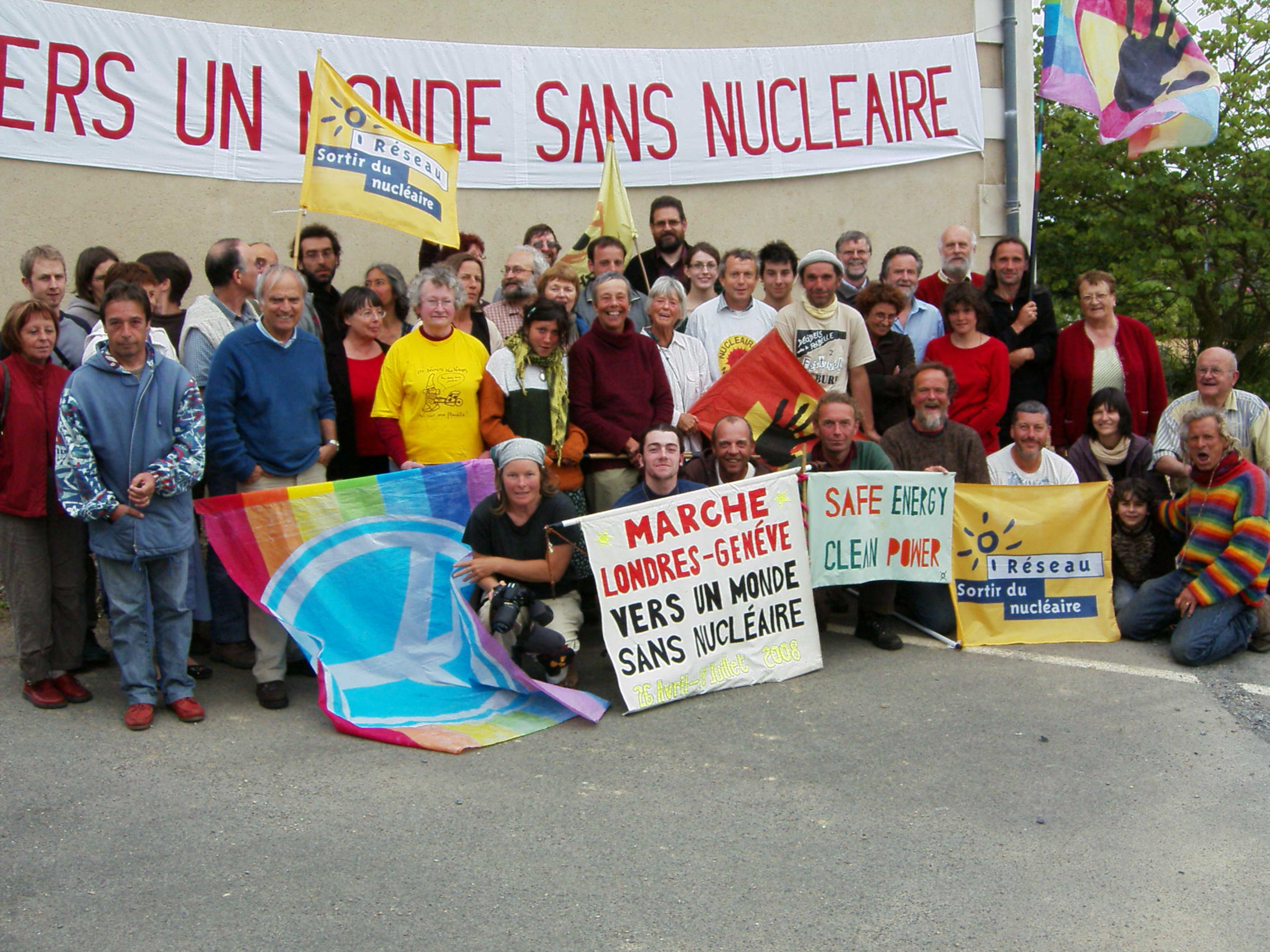
Anti-nuclear march from London to Geneva, 2008

Sortir du nucléaire (French pronunciation: [sɔʁtiʁ dy nykleɛʁ]; English "Nuclear phase-out") is a French federation of anti-nuclear groups.

Founded in 1997 as a result of the success of the struggle against the Superphénix, the organisation regularly campaigns against the use of nuclear power in France and in the world.

In September 2007, Sortir du nucléaire declined taking part in the talks with the French government, dubbed "Grenelle de l'environnement", in which major ecological organisations participated, because discussions about nuclear energy were forbidden by French president Nicolas Sarkozy.

== March 2007 protests against the EPR ==
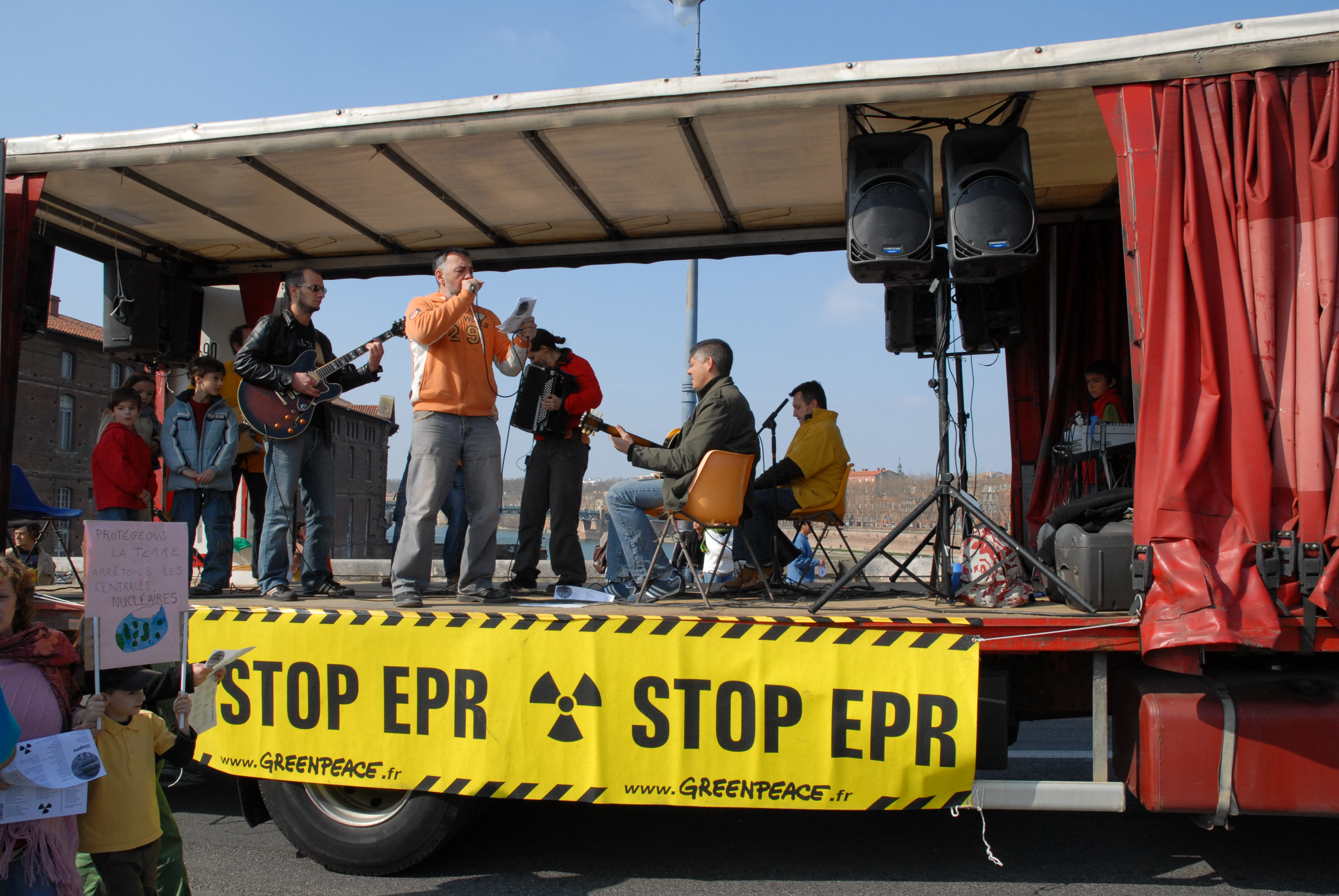
A scene from the event in Toulouse

On March 17, 2007 simultaneous protests, organised by Sortir du nucléaire, were staged in 5 French towns to protest construction of EPR plants; Rennes, Lyon, Toulouse, Lille, and Strasbourg.

Stop-EPR claimed that a total of over 60,000 people attended the rallies. The news outlet Evening Echo reported that it was a way to get the issue in the eye of candidates in the April–May two-round presidential elections of 2007. The largest crowd was in Rennes, close to Flamanville in Normandy, where preliminary construction on the EPR is underway. Organisers claimed the number of protesters in Rennes was 30,000 to 40,000. Police estimated the crowd at 10,000.

== See also ==
- Anti-nuclear movement
- Anti-nuclear movement in France
- Anti-nuclear movement in Germany
- Nuclear power in France
- Nuclear waste management in France
