= Nuclear power reactors in Europe =

This is a list of all the commercial nuclear reactors in the European Union and in Europe, with operational status. The list only includes civilian nuclear power reactors used to generate electricity for a power grid. All commercial nuclear reactors use nuclear fission. As of May 2021, there are 180 operable power reactors in Europe, with a combined electrical capacity of 159.36 GW. There are currently 8 power reactors under construction in Europe.

== Austria ==
| Plant name | Unit No. | Type | Model | Status | Capacity (MW) | Begin building | Commercial operation | Closed |
|---|---|---|---|---|---|---|---|---|
| Zwentendorf | 1 | BWR | BWR-69 (KWU) | Finished; never entered service | 878 | Apr 1972 | | 5 Nov 1978 |

== Belarus ==
| Plant name | Unit No. | Type | Model | Status | Capacity (MW) | Begin building | Commercial operation | Closed |
|---|---|---|---|---|---|---|---|---|
| Ostrovets | 1 | PWR | VVER-1200/V-491 | Operational | 1109 | 6 Nov 2013 | 10 Jun 2021 | |
| Ostrovets | 2 | PWR | VVER-1200/V-491 | Operational | 1109 | 24 Apr 2014 | 1 Nov 2023 | |
| Minsk | 1 | PWR | VVER-1000 | Unfinished | 963 | 1983 | | 1987 |
| Minsk | 2 | PWR | VVER-1000 | Unfinished | 963 | 1983 | | 1987 |

== Belgium ==
Belgium nuclear power plants (view)
Active plants
Closed plants

| Plant name | Unit No. | Type | Model | Status | Capacity (MW) | Begin building | Commercial operation | Closed |
|---|---|---|---|---|---|---|---|---|
| SCK•CEN | 1 | PWR | Westinghouse (WH) BR-3 | Decommissioned | 10 | 1 Nov 1957 | 10 Oct 1962 | 30 Jun 1987 |
| Doel | 1 | PWR | WH 2 loops | Shut down | 445 | 1 Jul 1969 | 15 Feb 1975 | 14 Feb 2025 |
| Doel | 2 | PWR | WH 2 loops | Operational | 445 | 1 Sep 1971 | 1 Dec 1975 | (1 Dec 2025) |
| Doel | 3 | PWR | Framatome 3 loops | Shut down | 1006 | 1 Jan 1975 | 1 Oct 1982 | 23 Sep 2022 |
| Doel | 4 | PWR | Belgian firms plus WH 3 loops | Operational | 1039 | 1 Dec 1978 | 1 Jul 1985 | (1 Nov 2035) |
| Tihange | 1 | PWR | Framatome 3 loops | Operational | 962 | 1 Jun 1970 | 1 Oct 1975 | (1 Oct 2025) |
| Tihange | 2 | PWR | Framatome 3 loops | Shut down | 1008 | 1 Apr 1976 | 1 Jun 1983 | 31 Jan 2023 |
| Tihange | 3 | PWR | Belgian firms plus WH 3 loops | Operational | 1046 | 1 Nov 1978 | 1 Sep 1985 | (1 Nov 2035) |

== Bulgaria ==
Nuclear power plants in Bulgaria (view)
Active plants
Unfinished/future plants

| Plant name | Unit No. | Type | Model | Status | Capacity (MW) | Begin building | Commercial operation | Closed |
|---|---|---|---|---|---|---|---|---|
| Kozloduy | 1 | PWR | VVER-440/V-230 | Shut down | 408 | 1 Apr 1970 | 28 Oct 1974 | 31 Dec 2002 |
| Kozloduy | 2 | PWR | VVER-440/V-230 | Shut down | 408 | 1 Apr 1970 | 10 Nov 1975 | 31 Dec 2002 |
| Kozloduy | 3 | PWR | VVER-440/V-230 | Shut down | 408 | 1 Oct 1973 | 20 Jan 1981 | 31 Dec 2006 |
| Kozloduy | 4 | PWR | VVER-440/V-230 | Shut down | 408 | 1 Oct 1973 | 20 Jun 1982 | 31 Dec 2006 |
| Kozloduy | 5 | PWR | VVER-1000/V-320 | Operational | 1003 | 9 Jul 1980 | 23 Dec 1988 | |
| Kozloduy | 6 | PWR | VVER-1000/V-320 | Operational | 1003 | 1 Apr 1982 | 30 Dec 1993 | |
| Kozloduy | 7 | PWR | AP1000 | Planned | 1150 | | (2033) | |
| Kozloduy | 8 | PWR | AP1000 | Planned | 1150 | | | |
| Belene | 1 | PWR | VVER-1000/V-320; VVER-1000/V-446B | Unfinished | 953; 1011 | 1987; 2008 | | |
| Belene | 2 | PWR | VVER-1000/V-320; VVER-1000/V-446B | Unfinished | 953; 1011 | 1987; 2008 | | |

== Czech Republic ==
Nuclear power stations in the Czech Republic (view)
Active plants
Planned plants

| Plant name | Unit No. | Type | Model | Status | Capacity (MW) | Begin building | Commercial operation | Closed |
|---|---|---|---|---|---|---|---|---|
| Dukovany | 1 | PWR | VVER-440/V-213 | Operational | 468 | 1 Jan 1979 | 3 May 1985 | |
| Dukovany | 2 | PWR | VVER-440/V-213 | Operational | 471 | 1 Jan 1979 | 21 Mar 1986 | |
| Dukovany | 3 | PWR | VVER-440/V-213 | Operational | 468 | 1 Mar 1979 | 20 Dec 1986 | |
| Dukovany | 4 | PWR | VVER-440/V-213 | Operational | 471 | 1 Mar 1979 | 19 Jul 1987 | |
| Dukovany | 5 | PWR | TBD | Planned | 1200 | | | |
| Dukovany | 6 | PWR | TBD | Planned | 1200 | | | |
| Temelín | 1 | PWR | VVER-1000/V-320 | Operational | 1003 | 1 Feb 1987 | 10 Jun 2002 | |
| Temelín | 2 | PWR | VVER-1000/V-320 | Operational | 1003 | 1 Feb 1987 | 18 Apr 2003 | |

== Finland ==
Nuclear power plants in Finland (view)
Active plants
Unfinished plants

| Plant name | Unit No. | Type | Model | Status | Capacity (MW) | Begin building | Commercial operation | Closed |
|---|---|---|---|---|---|---|---|---|
| Hanhikivi | 1 | PWR | VVER-1200/V-491 | Cancelled | 1200 | (2023) | (2029) | 2 May 2022 |
| Loviisa | 1 | PWR | VVER-440/V-213 | Operational | 507 | 1 May 1971 | 9 May 1977 | |
| Loviisa | 2 | PWR | VVER-440/V-213 | Operational | 507 | 1 Aug 1972 | 5 Jan 1981 | |
| Olkiluoto | 1 | BWR | ASEA-III, BWR-2500 | Operational | 890 | 1 Feb 1974 | 10 Oct 1979 | |
| Olkiluoto | 2 | BWR | ASEA-III, BWR-2500 | Operational | 890 | 1 Nov 1975 | 10 Jul 1982 | |
| Olkiluoto | 3 | PWR | EPR | Operational | 1600 | 12 Aug 2005 | 1 May 2023 | |

== France ==
Fission-electric stations in France (view)
Active plants
under construction
Closed plants

| Plant name | Unit No. | Type | Model | Status | Capacity (MW) | Begin building | Commercial operation | Closed |
|---|---|---|---|---|---|---|---|---|
| Belleville | 1 | PWR | P4 REP 1300 | Operational | 1310 | 1 May 1980 | 1 Jun 1988 | |
| Belleville | 2 | PWR | P4 REP 1300 | Operational | 1310 | 1 Aug 1980 | 1 Jan 1989 | |
| Blayais | 1 | PWR | CP1 | Operational | 910 | 1 Jan 1977 | 1 Dec 1981 | |
| Blayais | 2 | PWR | CP1 | Operational | 910 | 1 Jan 1977 | 1 Feb 1983 | |
| Blayais | 3 | PWR | CP1 | Operational | 910 | 1 Apr 1978 | 14 Nov 1983 | |
| Blayais | 4 | PWR | CP1 | Operational | 910 | 1 Apr 1978 | 1 Oct 1983 | |
| Brennilis | 1 | HWGCR | | Shut down/in decommissioning | 70 | 1 Jul 1962 | 1 Jun 1968 | 31 Jul 1985 |
| Bugey | 1 | GCR | UNGG | Shut down | 540 | 1 Dec 1965 | 1 Jul 1972 | 27 May 1994 |
| Bugey | 2 | PWR | CP0 | Operational | 910 | 1 Nov 1972 | 1 Mar 1979 | |
| Bugey | 3 | PWR | CP0 | Operational | 910 | 1 Sep 1973 | 1 Mar 1979 | |
| Bugey | 4 | PWR | CP0 | Operational | 880 | 1 Jun 1974 | 1 Jul 1979 | |
| Bugey | 5 | PWR | CP0 | Operational | 880 | 1 Jul 1974 | 3 Jan 1980 | |
| Bugey | 6 | PWR | EPR2 | Planned | 1670 | | | |
| Bugey | 7 | PWR | EPR2 | Planned | 1670 | | | |
| Cattenom | 1 | PWR | P4 REP 1300 | Operational | 1300 | 29 Oct 1979 | 1 Apr 1987 | |
| Cattenom | 2 | PWR | P4 REP 1300 | Operational | 1300 | 28 Jul 1980 | 1 Feb 1988 | |
| Cattenom | 3 | PWR | P4 REP 1300 | Operational | 1300 | 15 Jun 1982 | 1 Feb 1991 | |
| Cattenom | 4 | PWR | P4 REP 1300 | Operational | 1300 | 28 Sep 1983 | 1 Jan 1992 | |
| Chinon | A-1 | GCR | UNGG | Shut down | 70 | 1 Feb 1957 | 1 Feb 1964 | 16 Apr 1973 |
| Chinon | A-2 | GCR | UNGG | Shut down | 180 | 1 Aug 1959 | 24 Feb 1965 | 14 Jun 1985 |
| Chinon | A-3 | GCR | UNGG | Shut down | 360 | 1 Mar 1961 | 4 Aug 1966 | 15 Jun 1990 |
| Chinon | B-1 | PWR | CP2 | Operational | 905 | 1 Mar 1977 | 1 Feb 1984 | |
| Chinon | B-2 | PWR | CP2 | Operational | 905 | 1 Mar 1977 | 1 Aug 1984 | |
| Chinon | B-3 | PWR | CP2 | Operational | 905 | 1 Oct 1980 | 4 Mar 1987 | |
| Chinon | B-4 | PWR | CP2 | Operational | 905 | 1 Feb 1981 | 1 Apr 1988 | |
| Chooz | A-1 | PWR | CHOOZ-A | Decommissioned | 305 | 1 Jan 1962 | 15 Apr 1967 | 30 Oct 1991 |
| Chooz | B-1 | PWR | N4 REP 1450 | Operational | 1500 | 1 Jan 1984 | 15 May 2000 | |
| Chooz | B-2 | PWR | N4 REP 1450 | Operational | 1500 | 1 Jan 1984 | 15 May 2000 | |
| Civaux | 1 | PWR | N4 REP 1450 | Operational | 1495 | 15 Oct 1988 | 29 Jan 2002 | |
| Civaux | 2 | PWR | N4 REP 1450 | Operational | 1495 | 1 Apr 1991 | 23 Apr 2002 | |
| Cruas | 1 | PWR | CP2 | Operational | 915 | 1 Aug 1978 | 2 Apr 1984 | |
| Cruas | 2 | PWR | CP2 | Operational | 915 | 15 Nov 1978 | 1 Apr 1985 | |
| Cruas | 3 | PWR | CP2 | Operational | 915 | 15 Apr 1979 | 10 Sep 1984 | |
| Cruas | 4 | PWR | CP2 | Operational | 915 | 1 Oct 1979 | 11 Feb 1985 | |
| Dampierre | 1 | PWR | CP1 | Operational | 890 | 1 Feb 1975 | 10 Sep 1980 | |
| Dampierre | 2 | PWR | CP1 | Operational | 890 | 1 Apr 1975 | 16 Feb 1981 | |
| Dampierre | 3 | PWR | CP1 | Operational | 890 | 1 Sep 1975 | 27 May 1981 | |
| Dampierre | 4 | PWR | CP1 | Operational | 890 | 1 Dec 1975 | 20 Nov 1981 | |
| Fessenheim | 1 | PWR | CP0 | Shut down | 880 | 1 Sep 1971 | 1 Jan 1978 | 22 Feb 2020 |
| Fessenheim | 2 | PWR | CP0 | Shut down | 880 | 1 Feb 1972 | 1 Apr 1978 | 29 Jun 2020 |
| Flamanville | 1 | PWR | P4 REP 1300 | Operational | 1330 | 1 Dec 1979 | 1 Dec 1986 | |
| Flamanville | 2 | PWR | P4 REP 1300 | Operational | 1330 | 1 May 1980 | 9 Mar 1987 | |
| Flamanville | 3 | PWR | EPR | Operational | 1630 | 3 Dec 2007 | 21 Dec 2024 | |
| Golfech | 1 | PWR | P4 REP 1300 | Operational | 1310 | 17 Nov 1982 | 1 Feb 1991 | |
| Golfech | 2 | PWR | P4 REP 1300 | Operational | 1310 | 1 Oct 1984 | 4 Mar 1994 | |
| Gravelines | 1 | PWR | CP1 | Operational | 910 | 1 Feb 1975 | 25 Nov 1980 | |
| Gravelines | 2 | PWR | CP1 | Operational | 910 | 1 Mar 1975 | 1 Dec 1980 | |
| Gravelines | 3 | PWR | CP1 | Operational | 910 | 1 Dec 1975 | 1 Jun 1981 | |
| Gravelines | 4 | PWR | CP1 | Operational | 910 | 1 Apr 1976 | 1 Oct 1981 | |
| Gravelines | 5 | PWR | CP1 | Operational | 910 | 1 Oct 1979 | 15 Jan 1985 | |
| Gravelines | 6 | PWR | CP1 | Operational | 910 | 1 Oct 1979 | 25 Oct 1985 | |
| Gravelines | 7 | PWR | EPR2 | Planned | 1670 | | | |
| Gravelines | 8 | PWR | EPR2 | Planned | 1670 | | | |
| Nogent | 1 | PWR | P4 REP 1300 | Operational | 1310 | 26 May 1981 | 24 Feb 1988 | |
| Nogent | 2 | PWR | P4 REP 1300 | Operational | 1310 | 1 Jan 1982 | 1 May 1989 | |
| Paluel | 1 | PWR | P4 REP 1300 | Operational | 1330 | 15 Aug 1977 | 1 Dec 1985 | |
| Paluel | 2 | PWR | P4 REP 1300 | Operational | 1330 | 1 Jan 1978 | 1 Dec 1985 | |
| Paluel | 3 | PWR | P4 REP 1300 | Operational | 1330 | 1 Feb 1979 | 1 Feb 1986 | |
| Paluel | 4 | PWR | P4 REP 1300 | Operational | 1330 | 1 Feb 1980 | 1 Jun 1986 | |
| Penly | 1 | PWR | P4 REP 1300 | Operational | 1330 | 1 Sep 1982 | 1 Dec 1990 | |
| Penly | 2 | PWR | P4 REP 1300 | Operational | 1330 | 1 Aug 1984 | 1 Nov 1992 | |
| Penly | 3 | PWR | EPR2 | Planned | 1670 | (2024) | | |
| Penly | 4 | PWR | EPR2 | Planned | 1670 | (2024) | | |
| Phénix | 1 | FBR | PH-250 | Shut down | 130 | 1 Nov 1968 | 14 Jul 1974 | 1 Feb 2010 |
| Saint-Alban | 1 | PWR | P4 REP 1300 | Operational | 1335 | 29 Jan 1979 | 1 May 1986 | |
| Saint-Alban | 2 | PWR | P4 REP 1300 | Operational | 1335 | 31 Jul 1979 | 1 Mar 1987 | |
| Saint-Laurent | A-1 | GCR | UNGG | Shut down | 390 | 1 Oct 1963 | 1 Jun 1969 | 18 Apr 1990 |
| Saint-Laurent | A-2 | GCR | UNGG | Shut down | 465 | 1 Jan 1966 | 1 Nov 1971 | 27 May 1992 |
| Saint-Laurent | B-1 | PWR | CP2 | Operational | 915 | 1 May 1976 | 1 Aug 1983 | |
| Saint-Laurent | B-2 | PWR | CP2 | Operational | 915 | 1 Jul 1976 | 1 Aug 1983 | |
| Superphénix | 1 | FBR | Na-1200 | Shut down/in decommissioning | 1200 | 13 Dec 1976 | 1 Dec 1986 | 31 Dec 1998 |
| Tricastin | 1 | PWR | CP1 | Operational | 915 | 1 Nov 1974 | 1 Dec 1980 | |
| Tricastin | 2 | PWR | CP1 | Operational | 915 | 1 Dec 1974 | 1 Dec 1980 | |
| Tricastin | 3 | PWR | CP1 | Operational | 915 | 1 Apr 1975 | 11 May 1981 | |
| Tricastin | 4 | PWR | CP1 | Operational | 915 | 1 May 1975 | 1 Nov 1981 | |

== Germany ==
Nuclear power plants in Germany (view)
Active plants
Closed plants
Unfinished plants

| Plant name | Unit No. | Type | Model | Status | Capacity (MW) | Begin building | Commercial operation | Closed |
|---|---|---|---|---|---|---|---|---|
| AVR | 1 | HTGR | PBR Prototype | Shut down | 13 | 1 Aug 1961 | 19 May 1969 | 31 Dec 1988 |
| Biblis | 1 | PWR | Siemens-KWU | Shut down/in decommissioning | 1167 | 1 Jan 1970 | 26 Feb 1975 | 6 Aug 2011 |
| Biblis | 2 | PWR | KWU | Shut down/in decommissioning | 1240 | 1 Feb 1972 | 31 Jan 1977 | 6 Aug 2011 |
| Brokdorf | 1 | PWR | KWU | Shut down | 1410 | 1 Jan 1976 | 22 Dec 1986 | 31 Dec 2021 |
| Brunsbüttel | 1 | BWR | BWR-69 | Shut down | 771 | 15 Apr 1970 | 9 Feb 1977 | 6 Aug 2011 |
| Emsland | 1 | PWR | Konvoi (KWU) | Shut down | 1329 | 10 Aug 1982 | 20 Jun 1988 | 15 Apr 2023 |
| Grafenrheinfeld | 1 | PWR | KWU | Shut down | 1275 | 1 Jan 1975 | 17 Jun 1982 | 27 Jun 2015 |
| Greifswald | 1 | PWR | VVER-440/V-230 | Shut down/in decommissioning | 408 | 1 Mar 1970 | 12 Jul 1974 | 14 Feb 1990 |
| Greifswald | 2 | PWR | VVER-440/V-230 | Shut down/in decommissioning | 408 | 1 Mar 1970 | 16 Apr 1975 | 14 Feb 1990 |
| Greifswald | 3 | PWR | VVER-440/V-230 | Shut down/in decommissioning | 408 | 1 Apr 1972 | 1 May 1978 | 28 Feb 1990 |
| Greifswald | 4 | PWR | VVER-440/V-230 | Shut down/in decommissioning | 408 | 1 Apr 1972 | 1 Nov 1979 | 22 Jul 1990 |
| Greifswald | 5 | PWR | VVER-440/V-213 | Shut down/in decommissioning | 408 | 1 Dec 1976 | 1 Nov 1989 | 24 Nov 1989 |
| Greifswald | 6 | PWR | VVER-440/V-213 | Finished; never entered service | 408 | | | |
| Grohnde | 1 | PWR | KWU | Shut down | 1360 | 1 Jun 1976 | 1 Feb 1985 | 31 Dec 2021 |
| Grosswelzheim | 1 | BWR | BWR | Dismantled | 25 | 1 Jan 1965 | 2 Aug 1970 | 20 Apr 1971 |
| Gundremmingen | A | BWR | GE, BWR-1 | Shut down/in decommissioning | 237 | 12 Dec 1962 | 12 Apr 1967 | 13 Jan 1977 |
| Gundremmingen | B | BWR | BWR-72 (KWU) | Shut down | 1284 | 20 Jul 1976 | 19 Jul 1984 | 31 Dec 2017 |
| Gundremmingen | C | BWR | BWR-72 (KWU) | Shut down | 1288 | 20 Jul 1976 | 18 Jan 1985 | 31 Dec 2021 |
| Isar | 1 | BWR | BWR-69 | Shut down/in decommissioning | 878 | 1 May 1972 | 21 Mar 1979 | 6 Aug 2011 |
| Isar | 2 | PWR | Konvoi (KWU) | Shut down | 1410 | 15 Sep 1982 | 9 Apr 1988 | 15 Apr 2023 |
| Kahl | 1 | BWR | BWR | Dismantled | 15 | 1 Jul 1958 | 1 Feb 1962 | 25 Nov 1985 |
| SNR-300 | 1 | FBR | | Finished; never entered service | | 1972 | | 1985 |
| KNK II | 1 | FBR | | Shut down | 17 | 1 Sep 1974 | 3 Mar 1979 | 23 Aug 1991 |
| Krümmel | 1 | BWR | BWR-69 (KWU) | Shut down | 1346 | 5 Apr 1974 | 28 Mar 1984 | 6 Aug 2011 |
| Lingen | 1 | BWR | BWR | Shut down | 183 | 1 Oct 1964 | 1 Oct 1968 | 5 Jan 1977 |
| Mülheim-Kärlich | 1 | PWR | B & W | Shut down/in decommissioning | 1219 | 15 Jan 1975 | 8 Aug 1987 | 9 Sep 1988 |
| MZFR | 1 | PHWR | PHWR | Shut down | 52 | 1 Dec 1961 | 19 Dec 1966 | 3 May 1984 |
| Neckarwestheim | 1 | PWR | KWU | Shut down | 785 | 1 Feb 1972 | 1 Dec 1976 | 6 Aug 2011 |
| Neckarwestheim | 2 | PWR | Konvoi (KWU) | Shut down | 1310 | 9 Nov 1982 | 15 Apr 1989 | 15 Apr 2023 |
| Niederaichbach | 1 | HWGCR | Pressure tube reactor | Shut down/decommissioned | 100 | 1 Jun 1966 | 1 Jan 1973 | 31 Jul 1974 |
| Obrigheim | 1 | PWR | Siemens | Shut down/in decommissioning | 340 | 15 Mar 1965 | 31 Mar 1969 | 11 May 2005 |
| Philippsburg | 1 | BWR | BWR-69 | Shut down | 890 | 1 Oct 1970 | 26 Mar 1980 | 6 Aug 2011 |
| Philippsburg | 2 | PWR | KWU | Shut down | 1402 | 7 Jul 1977 | 18 Apr 1985 | 31 Dec 2019 |
| Rheinsberg | 1 | PWR | VVER-70 | Shut down/in decommissioning | 62 | 1 Jan 1960 | 11 Oct 1966 | 1 Jun 1990 |
| Stade | 1 | PWR | Siemens | Shut down/in decommissioning | 640 | 1 Dec 1967 | 19 May 1972 | 4 Nov 2003 |
| Stendal | 1 | PWR | VVER-1000/V-320 | Unfinished | | 1983 | | 1990 |
| Stendal | 2 | PWR | VVER-1000/V-320 | Unfinished | | 1983 | | 1990 |
| THTR-300 | 1 | HTGR | PBR | Decommissioned | 296 | 3 May 1971 | 1 Jun 1987 | 29 Sep 1988 |
| Unterweser | 1 | PWR | KWU | Shut down/in decommissioning | 1345 | 1 Jul 1972 | 6 Sep 1979 | 6 Aug 2011 |
| Würgassen | 1 | BWR | BWR-69 (AEG) | Shut down/in decommissioning | 640 | 26 Jan 1968 | 11 Nov 1975 | 26 Aug 1994 |

== Hungary ==
| Plant name | Unit No. | Type | Model | Status | Capacity (MW) | Begin building | Commercial operation | Closed |
|---|---|---|---|---|---|---|---|---|
| Paks | 1 | PWR | VVER-440/V-213 | Operational | 470 | 1 Aug 1974 | 10 Aug 1983 | |
| Paks | 2 | PWR | VVER-440/V-213 | Operational | 473 | 1 Aug 1974 | 14 Nov 1984 | |
| Paks | 3 | PWR | VVER-440/V-213 | Operational | 473 | 1 Oct 1979 | 1 Dec 1986 | |
| Paks | 4 | PWR | VVER-440/V-213 | Operational | 471 | 1 Oct 1979 | 1 Nov 1987 | |
| Paks | 5 | PWR | VVER-1200 | Under construction | 1114 | (2024) | | |
| Paks | 6 | PWR | VVER-1200 | Under construction | 1114 | (2024) | | |

== Italy ==
Nuclear power stations in Italy (view)
Closed plants
Canceled plants

| Plant name | Unit No. | Type | Model | Status | Capacity (MW) | Begin building | Commercial operation | Closed |
|---|---|---|---|---|---|---|---|---|
| Caorso | 1 | BWR | BWR-4 Mark2 | Shut down/in decommissioning | 860 | 1 Jan 1970 | 1 Dec 1981 | 1 Jul 1990 |
| Enrico Fermi | 1 | PWR | WH 4-loop | Shut down/in decommissioning | 260 | 1 Jul 1961 | 1 Jan 1965 | 1 Jul 1990 |
| Garigliano | 1 | BWR | BWR-1 | Shut down/in decommissioning | 150 | 1 Nov 1959 | 1 Jun 1964 | 1 Mar 1982 |
| Latina | 1 | GCR | Magnox | Shut down/in decommissioning | 153 | 1 Nov 1958 | 1 Jan 1964 | 1 Dec 1987 |
| Montalto | 1 | BWR | | Unfinished | 982 | 1 Jul 1982 | | 1 Jan 1988 |
| Montalto | 2 | BWR | | Unfinished | 982 | 1 Jul 1982 | | 1 Jul 1988 |
| Trino 2 | 1 | PWR | | Unfinished | 950 | | | 23 Dec 1987 |
| Trino 2 | 2 | PWR | | Unfinished | 950 | | | 23 Dec 1987 |

== Lithuania ==
| Plant name | Unit No. | Type | Model | Status | Capacity (MW) | Begin building | Commercial operation | Closed |
|---|---|---|---|---|---|---|---|---|
| Ignalina | 1 | LWGR | RBMK-1500 | Shut down/in decommissioning | 1185 | 1 May 1977 | 31 Dec 1983 | 31 Dec 2004 |
| Ignalina | 2 | LWGR | RBMK-1500 | Shut down/in decommissioning | 1185 | 1 Jan 1978 | Aug 1987 | 31 Dec 2009 |
| Ignalina | 3 | LWGR | RBMK-1500 | Unfinished | 1185 | | | |

== Netherlands ==
Nuclear power plants in the Netherlands(view)
Active plants
Closed plants

| Plant name | Unit No. | Type | Model | Status | Capacity (MW) | Begin building | Commercial operation | Closed |
|---|---|---|---|---|---|---|---|---|
| Borssele | 1 | PWR | KWU 2LP | Operational | 482 | 1 Jul 1969 | 26 Oct 1973 | (2033) |
| Dodewaard | 1 | BWR | BWR-2 | Shut down | 55 | 1 May 1965 | 26 Mar 1969 | 26 Mar 1997 |

== Poland ==
| Plant name | Unit No. | Type | Model | Status | Capacity (MW) | Begin building | Commercial operation | Closed |
|---|---|---|---|---|---|---|---|---|
| Żarnowiec | 1 | PWR | VVER-440 | Unfinished | 440 | 31 Mar 1982 | | 4 Sep 1990 |
| Żarnowiec | 2 | PWR | VVER-440 | Unfinished | 440 | 31 Mar 1982 | | 4 Sep 1990 |
| Choczewo | 1 | PWR | AP1000 | Planned | 1250 | (2026) | (2033) | |
| Choczewo | 2 | PWR | AP1000 | Planned | 1250 | | (2035–2036) | |
| Choczewo | 3 | PWR | AP1000 | Planned | 1250 | | (2037–2039) | |
| Pątnów | 1 | PWR | APR-1400 | Planned | 1340 | | | |
| Pątnów | 2 | PWR | APR-1400 | Planned | 1340 | | | |
| Włocławek | 1 | BWR | BWRX-300 | Planned | 300 | | (2030) | |
| Ostrołęka | 1 | BWR | BWRX-300 | Planned | 300 | | (2030) | |
| Warsaw | 1 | BWR | BWRX-300 | Planned | 300 | | (2030) | |
| Tarnobrzeg/Stalowa Wola | 1 | BWR | BWRX-300 | Planned | 300 | | (2030) | |
| Dąbrowa Górnicza | 1 | BWR | BWRX-300 | Planned | 300 | | (2030) | |
| Stawy Monowskie | 1 | BWR | BWRX-300 | Planned | 300 | | (2030) | |
| Kraków | 1 | BWR | BWRX-300 | Planned | 300 | | (2030) | |

== Romania ==
| Plant name | Unit No. | Type | Model | Status | Capacity (MW) | Begin building | Commercial operation | Closed |
|---|---|---|---|---|---|---|---|---|
| Cernavodă | 1 | PHWR | CANDU-6 | Operational | 650 | 31 Mar 1983 | 2 Dec 1996 | |
| Cernavodă | 2 | PHWR | CANDU-6 | Operational | 650 | 1 Jul 1983 | 1 Nov 2007 | |
| Cernavodă | 3 | PHWR | CANDU-6 | Unfinished; restart planned | 650 | | | |
| Cernavodă | 4 | PHWR | CANDU-6 | Unfinished; restart planned | 650 | | | |
| Cernavodă | 5 | PHWR | CANDU-6 | Unfinished | 650 | | | |

== Slovakia ==
Nuclear power stations in Slovakia (view)
Active plants

| Plant name | Unit No. | Type | Model | Status | Capacity (MW) | Begin building | Commercial operation | Closed |
|---|---|---|---|---|---|---|---|---|
| Bohunice | A-1 | HWGCR | KS 150 | Decommissioned | 93 | 1 Aug 1958 | 25 Dec 1972 | 22 Feb 1977 |
| Bohunice | 1 | PWR | VVER-440/V-230 | Shut down | 408 | 24 Apr 1972 | 1 Apr 1980 | 31 Dec 2006 |
| Bohunice | 2 | PWR | VVER-440/V-230 | Shut down | 408 | 24 Apr 1972 | 1 Jan 1981 | 31 Dec 2008 |
| Bohunice | 3 | PWR | VVER-440/V-213 | Operational | 472 | 1 Dec 1976 | 14 Feb 1985 | (2045) |
| Bohunice | 4 | PWR | VVER-440/V-213 | Operational | 471 | 1 Dec 1976 | 18 Dec 1985 | (2045) |
| Mochovce | 1 | PWR | VVER-440 V-213 | Operational | 436 | 13 Oct 1983 | 29 Oct 1998 | (2058) |
| Mochovce | 2 | PWR | VVER-440/V-213 | Operational | 436 | 13 Oct 1983 | 11 Apr 2000 | (2060) |
| Mochovce | 3 | PWR | VVER-440/V-213 | Operational | 440 | 27 Jan 1987 | 17 Oct 2023 | |
| Mochovce | 4 | PWR | VVER-440/V-213 | Under construction | 440 | 27 Jan 1987 | | |

== Slovenia ==
| Plant name | Unit No. | Type | Model | Status | Capacity (MW) | Begin building | Commercial operation | Closed |
|---|---|---|---|---|---|---|---|---|
| Krško | 1 | PWR | WH 2 loops | Operational | 688 | 30 Mar 1975 | 1 Jan 1983 | (2043) |
| Krško | 2 | PWR | TBD | Planned | 1100 | | (2030) | |

== Spain ==
| Plant name | Unit No. | Type | Model | Status | Capacity (MW) | Begin building | Commercial operation | Closed |
|---|---|---|---|---|---|---|---|---|
| Almaraz | 1 | PWR | WH 3 loops | Operational | 1011 | 3 Jul 1973 | 1 Sep 1983 | |
| Almaraz | 2 | PWR | WH 3 loops | Operational | 1006 | 3 Jul 1973 | 1 Jul 1984 | |
| Ascó | 1 | PWR | WH 3 loops | Operational | 995 | 16 May 1974 | 10 Dec 1984 | |
| Ascó | 2 | PWR | WH-3 loops | Operational | 997 | 7 Mar 1975 | 31 Mar 1986 | |
| Cofrentes | 1 | BWR | BWR-6 | Operational | 1064 | 9 Sep 1975 | 11 Mar 1985 | |
| José Cabrera | 1 | PWR | WH 1 loop | Shut down/in decommissioning | 141 | 24 Jun 1964 | 13 Aug 1969 | 30 Apr 2006 |
| Lemoniz | 1 | PWR | | Unfinished | | 1972 | | 1984 |
| Lemoniz | 2 | PWR | | Unfinished | | 1972 | | 1984 |
| Santa María de Garoña | 1 | BWR | BWR-3 | Shut down/in decommissioning | 446 | 11 May 1971 | 15 Feb 1975 | 6 Jul 2013 |
| Trillo | 1 | PWR | KWU 3 loops | Operational | 1003 | 17 Aug 1979 | 6 Aug 1988 | |
| Valdecaballeros | 1 | BWR | | Unfinished | | 1975 | | 1984 |
| Valdecaballeros | 2 | BWR | | Unfinished | | 1975 | | 1984 |
| Vandellòs | 1 | GCR | UNGG | Shut down/in decommissioning | 480 | 1967 | 2 Aug 1972 | 31 Jul 1990 |
| Vandellòs | 2 | PWR | WH 3 loops | Operational | 1045 | 29 Dec 1980 | 8 Mar 1988 | |

== Sweden ==
Nuclear power plants in Sweden (view)
Active plants
Closed plants
Unfinished plants

| Plant name | Unit No. | Type | Model | Status | Capacity (MW) | Begin building | Commercial operation | Closed | |
|---|---|---|---|---|---|---|---|---|---|
| Ågesta | 1 | PHWR | R3 | Shut down/in decommissioning | 10 | 1 Dec 1957 | 1 May 1964 | 2 Jun 1974 | (Note: The full reactor model name is R3/Adam.) |
| Barsebäck | 1 | BWR | ASEA-II | Shut down/in decommissioning | 600 | 1 Feb 1971 | 1 Jul 1975 | 30 Nov 1999 | (Note: The full reactor model name is ASEA-ATOM Gen II.) |
| Barsebäck | 2 | BWR | ASEA-II | Shut down/in decommissioning | 600 | 1 Jan 1973 | 1 Jul 1977 | 31 May 2005 | (Note: The full reactor model name is ASEA-ATOM Gen II.) |
| Forsmark | 1 | BWR | ASEA-III, BWR-2500 | Operational | 986 | 1 Jun 1973 | 10 Dec 1980 | | (Note: The full reactor model name is ASEA-ATOM Gen III, BWR-2500, BWR 69.) |
| Forsmark | 2 | BWR | ASEA-III, BWR-2500 | Operational | 1116 | 1 Jan 1975 | 7 Jul 1981 | | (Note: The full reactor model name is ASEA-ATOM Gen III, BWR-2500, BWR 69.) |
| Forsmark | 3 | BWR | ASEA-IV, BWR-3000 | Operational | 1167 | 1 Jan 1979 | 18 Aug 1985 | | (Note: The full reactor model name is ASEA-ATOM Gen IV, BWR-3000, BWR 75.) |
| Oskarshamn | 1 | BWR | ASEA-I | Shut down/in decommissioning | 473 | 1 Aug 1966 | 6 Feb 1972 | 19 Jun 2017 | (Note: The full reactor model name is ASEA-ATOM Gen I.) |
| Oskarshamn | 2 | BWR | ASEA-II | Shut down/in decommissioning | 638 | 1 Sep 1969 | 1 Jan 1975 | 22 Dec 2016 | (Note: The full reactor model name is ASEA-ATOM Gen II.) |
| Oskarshamn | 3 | BWR | ASEA-IV, BWR-3000 | Operational | 1450 | 1 May 1980 | 15 Aug 1985 | | (Note: The full reactor model name is ASEA-ATOM Gen IV, BWR-3000, BWR 75.) |
| Marviken | 1 | BHWR | R4 | Unfinished | 196 | 1 Apr 1965 | | 27 May 1970 | (Note: The full reactor model name is R4/Eva. Construction date is approximate. Data are from Swedish Radiation Safety Authority.) |
| Ringhals | 1 | BWR | ASEA-I | Shut down/in decommissioning | 881 | 1 Feb 1969 | 1 Jan 1976 | 31 Dec 2020 | (Note: The full reactor model name is ASEA-ATOM Gen I. Closed at midnight on New Year's Eve.) |
| Ringhals | 2 | PWR | WH 3-loops | Shut down/in decommissioning | 904 | 1 Oct 1970 | 1 May 1975 | 30 Dec 2019 | (Note: The full reactor model name is Westinghouse 3-loops.) |
| Ringhals | 3 | PWR | WH 3-loops | Operational | 1062 | 1 Sep 1972 | 9 Sep 1981 | | (Note: The full reactor model name is Westinghouse 3-loops.) |
| Ringhals | 4 | PWR | WH 3-loops | Operational | 1104 | 1 Nov 1973 | 21 Nov 1983 | | (Note: The full reactor model name is Westinghouse 3-loops.) |

== Switzerland ==
Switzerland nuclear power plants (view)
Active plants
Closed plants

| Plant name | Unit No. | Type | Model | Status | Capacity (MW) | Begin building | Commercial operation | Closed |
|---|---|---|---|---|---|---|---|---|
| Beznau | 1 | PWR | WH 2-loops | Operational | 365 | 1 Sep 1965 | 1 Sep 1969 | (2029) |
| Beznau | 2 | PWR | WH 2-loops | Operational | 365 | 1 Jan 1968 | 1 Dec 1971 | (2031) |
| Gösgen | 1 | PWR | KWU 3-loops | Operational | 1010 | 1 Dec 1973 | 1 Nov 1979 | |
| Leibstadt | 1 | BWR | BWR-6 | Operational | 1220 | 1 Jan 1974 | 15 Dec 1984 | |
| Lucens | 1 | HWGCR | HWGCR | Decommissioned | 6 | 1 Apr 1962 | 29 Dec 1966 | 21 Jan 1969 |
| Mühleberg | 1 | BWR | BWR-4 | Shut down/in decommissioning | 373 | 1 Mar 1967 | 6 Nov 1972 | 20 Dec 2019 |

== Ukraine ==
| Plant name | Unit No. | Type | Model | Status | Capacity (MW) | Begin building | Commercial operation | Closed |
|---|---|---|---|---|---|---|---|---|
| Chernobyl | 1 | LWGR | RBMK-1000 | Shut down/in decommissioning | 740 | 1 Mar 1970 | 27 May 1978 | 30 Nov 1996 |
| Chernobyl | 2 | LWGR | RBMK-1000 | Shut down/in decommissioning | 925 | 1 Feb 1973 | 28 May 1979 | 11 Oct 1991 |
| Chernobyl | 3 | LWGR | RBMK-1000 | Shut down/in decommissioning | 925 | 1 Mar 1976 | 8 Jun 1982 | 15 Dec 2000 |
| Chernobyl | 4 | LWGR | RBMK-1000 | Destroyed | 925 | 1 Apr 1979 | 26 Mar 1984 | 26 Apr 1986 |
| Chernobyl | 5 | LWGR | RBMK-1000 | Unfinished | 925 | | | |
| Chernobyl | 6 | LWGR | RBMK-1000 | Unfinished | 925 | | | |
| Chyhyryn | 1 | PWR | AP1000 | Planned | 1100 | | | |
| Chyhyryn | 2 | PWR | AP1000 | Planned | 1100 | | | |
| Chyhyryn | 3 | PWR | AP1000 | Planned | 1100 | | | |
| Chyhyryn | 4 | PWR | AP1000 | Planned | 1100 | | | |
| Crimean | 1 | PWR | VVER-1000 | Unfinished | 950 | 26 Jan 1984 | | 1987 |
| Crimean | 2 | PWR | VVER-1000 | Unfinished | 950 | 26 Jan 1984 | | 1987 |
| Kharkiv | 1 | PWR | VVER-1000 | Unfinished | 900 | 1988 | | 1990 |
| Kharkiv | 2 | PWR | VVER-1000 | Unfinished | 900 | 1988 | | 1990 |
| Khmelnytskyi | 1 | PWR | VVER-1000/V-320 | Operational | 950 | 1 Nov 1981 | 13 Aug 1988 | |
| Khmelnytskyi | 2 | PWR | VVER-1000/V-320 | Operational | 950 | 1 Feb 1985 | 15 Dec 2005 | |
| Khmelnytskyi | 3 | PWR | VVER-1000 | Under construction | 950 | 1 Sep 1985 | (2026) | |
| Khmelnytskyi | 4 | PWR | VVER-1000 | Under construction | 950 | 1 Jun 1986 | (2027) | |
| Khmelnytskyi | 5 | PWR | AP1000 | Under construction | 1100 | April 11, 2024 | (2029) | |
| Khmelnytskyi | 6 | PWR | AP1000 | Under construction | 1100 | April 11, 2024 | (2029) | |
| Odesa | 1 | PWR | VVER-1000 | Unfinished | 900 | | | 1989 |
| Odesa | 2 | PWR | VVER-1000 | Unfinished | 900 | | | 1989 |
| Rivne | 1 | PWR | VVER-440/V-213 | Operational | 381 | 1 Aug 1973 | 22 Sep 1981 | |
| Rivne | 2 | PWR | VVER-440/V-213 | Operational | 376 | 1 Oct 1973 | 29 Jul 1982 | |
| Rivne | 3 | PWR | VVER-1000/V-320 | Operational | 950 | 1 Feb 1980 | 16 May 1987 | |
| Rivne | 4 | PWR | VVER-1000/V-320 | Operational | 950 | 1 Aug 1986 | 6 Apr 2006 | |
| Rivne | 5 | PWR | AP1000 | Planned | 1100 | | | |
| South Ukraine | 1 | PWR | VVER-1000/V-302 | Operational | 950 | 1 Aug 1976 | 2 Dec 1983 | |
| South Ukraine | 2 | PWR | VVER-1000/V-338 | Operational | 950 | 1 Jul 1981 | 6 Apr 1985 | |
| South Ukraine | 3 | PWR | VVER-1000/V-320 | Operational | 950 | 1 Nov 1984 | 29 Dec 1989 | |
| South Ukraine | 4 | PWR | AP1000 | Planned | 1100 | | | |
| Zaporizhzhia | 1 | PWR | VVER-1000/V-320 | Operational | 950 | 1 Apr 1980 | 25 Dec 1985 | |
| Zaporizhzhia | 2 | PWR | VVER-1000/V-320 | Operational | 950 | 1 Jan 1981 | 15 Feb 1986 | |
| Zaporizhzhia | 3 | PWR | VVER-1000/V-320 | Operational | 950 | 1 Apr 1982 | 5 Mar 1987 | |
| Zaporizhzhia | 4 | PWR | VVER-1000/V-320 | Operational | 950 | 1 Apr 1983 | 14 Apr 1988 | |
| Zaporizhzhia | 5 | PWR | VVER-1000/V-320 | Operational | 950 | 1 Nov 1985 | 27 Oct 1989 | |
| Zaporizhzhia | 6 | PWR | VVER-1000/V-320 | Operational | 950 | 1 Jun 1986 | 17 Sep 1996 | |
| Zaporizhzhia | 7 | PWR | AP1000 | Planned | 1100 | | | |

== United Kingdom ==
Nuclear power plants in United Kingdom (view)
Active plants
Cancelled plants
Closed plants
Under construction
Planned plants

| Plant name | Unit No. | Type | Model | Status | Capacity (MW) | Begin building | Commercial operation | Closed |
|---|---|---|---|---|---|---|---|---|
| Berkeley | 1 | GCR | Magnox | Decommissioned | 138 | 1 Jan 1957 | 12 Jun 1962 | 31 Mar 1989 |
| Berkeley | 2 | GCR | Magnox | Decommissioned | 138 | 1 Jan 1957 | 20 Oct 1962 | 26 Oct 1988 |
| Bradwell | 1 | GCR | Magnox | Decommissioned | 123 | 1 Jan 1957 | 1 Jul 1962 | 31 Mar 2002 |
| Bradwell | 2 | GCR | Magnox | Decommissioned | 123 | 1 Jan 1957 | 12 Nov 1962 | 30 Mar 2002 |
| Calder Hall | 1 | GCR | Magnox | Shut down/in decommissioning | 49 | 1 Aug 1953 | 1 Oct 1956 | 31 Mar 2003 |
| Calder Hall | 2 | GCR | Magnox | Shut down/in decommissioning | 49 | 1 Aug 1953 | 1 Feb 1957 | 31 Mar 2003 |
| Calder Hall | 3 | GCR | Magnox | Shut down/in decommissioning | 49 | 1 Aug 1955 | 1 May 1958 | 31 Mar 2003 |
| Calder Hall | 4 | GCR | Magnox | Shut down/in decommissioning | 49 | 1 Aug 1955 | 1 Apr 1959 | 31 Mar 2003 |
| Chapelcross | 1 | GCR | Magnox | Shut down/in decommissioning | 48 | 1 Oct 1955 | 1 Mar 1959 | 29 Jun 2004 |
| Chapelcross | 2 | GCR | Magnox | Shut down/in decommissioning | 48 | 1 Oct 1955 | 1 Aug 1959 | 29 Jun 2004 |
| Chapelcross | 3 | GCR | Magnox | Shut down/in decommissioning | 48 | 1 Oct 1955 | 1 Dec 1959 | 29 Jun 2004 |
| Chapelcross | 4 | GCR | Magnox | Shut down/in decommissioning | 48 | 1 Oct 1955 | 1 Mar 1960 | 29 Jun 2004 |
| Dounreay | 1 | SFR | DFR | Shut down/in decommissioning | 11 | 1 Mar 1955 | 1 Oct 1962 | 1 Mar 1977 |
| Dounreay | 2 | SFR | PFR | Shut down/in decommissioning | 234 | 1 Jan 1966 | 1 Jul 1976 | 31 Mar 1994 |
| Dungeness A | A-1 | GCR | Magnox | Shut down/in decommissioning | 225 | 1 Jul 1960 | 28 Oct 1965 | 31 Dec 2006 |
| Dungeness A | A-2 | GCR | Magnox | Shut down/in decommissioning | 225 | 1 Jul 1960 | 30 Dec 1965 | 31 Dec 2006 |
| Dungeness B | B-1 | GCR | AGR | Shut down | 520 | 1 Oct 1965 | 1 Apr 1985 | 7 Jun 2021 |
| Dungeness B | B-2 | GCR | AGR | Shut down | 520 | 1 Oct 1965 | 1 Apr 1989 | 7 Jun 2021 |
| Hartlepool | 1 | GCR | AGR | Operational | 595 | 1 Oct 1968 | 1 Apr 1989 | (2027) |
| Hartlepool | 2 | GCR | AGR | Operational | 585 | 1 Oct 1968 | 1 Apr 1989 | (2027) |
| Heysham | A-1 | GCR | AGR | Operational | 585 | 1 Dec 1970 | 1 Apr 1989 | (2027) |
| Heysham | A-2 | GCR | AGR | Operational | 575 | 1 Dec 1970 | 1 Apr 1989 | (2027) |
| Heysham | B-1 | GCR | AGR | Operational | 610 | 1 Aug 1980 | 1 Apr 1989 | (2030) |
| Heysham | B-2 | GCR | AGR | Operational | 610 | 1 Aug 1980 | 1 Apr 1989 | (2030) |
| Hinkley Point A | 1 | GCR | Magnox | Shut down/in decommissioning | 235 | 1 Nov 1957 | 30 Mar 1965 | 23 May 2000 |
| Hinkley Point A | 2 | GCR | Magnox | Shut down/in decommissioning | 235 | 1 Nov 1957 | 5 May 1965 | 23 May 2000 |
| Hinkley Point B | 1 | GCR | AGR | Shut down/in decommissioning | 435 | 1 Sep 1967 | 2 Oct 1978 | 1 Aug 2022 |
| Hinkley Point B | 2 | GCR | AGR | Shut down/in decommissioning | 435 | 1 Sep 1967 | 27 Sep 1976 | 6 Jul 2022 |
| Hinkley Point C | 1 | PWR | EPR | Under construction | 1600 | 11 Dec 2018 | (2029) | |
| Hinkley Point C | 2 | PWR | EPR | Under construction | 1600 | 12 Dec 2019 | (2030) | |
| Hunterston A | 1 | GCR | Magnox | Shut down/in decommissioning | 150 | 1 Oct 1957 | 5 Feb 1964 | 30 Mar 1990 |
| Hunterston A | 2 | GCR | Magnox | Shut down/in decommissioning | 150 | 1 Oct 1957 | 1 Jul 1964 | 31 Dec 1989 |
| Hunterston B | 1 | GCR | AGR | Shut down | 460 | 1 Nov 1967 | 6 Feb 1976 | 26 Nov 2021 |
| Hunterston B | 2 | GCR | AGR | Shut down | 460 | 1 Nov 1967 | 31 Mar 1977 | 7 Jan 2022 |
| Oldbury | 1 | GCR | Magnox | Shut down/in decommissioning | 217 | 1 May 1962 | 31 Dec 1967 | 29 Feb 2012 |
| Oldbury | 2 | GCR | Magnox | Shut down/in decommissioning | 217 | 1 May 1962 | 30 Sep 1968 | 30 Jun 2011 |
| Sizewell A | 1 | GCR | Magnox | Shut down/in decommissioning | 210 | 1 Apr 1961 | 25 Mar 1966 | 31 Dec 2006 |
| Sizewell A | 2 | GCR | Magnox | Shut down/in decommissioning | 210 | 1 Apr 1961 | 15 Sep 1966 | 31 Dec 2006 |
| Sizewell B | 1 | PWR | WH SNUPPS | Operational | 1191 | 18 Jul 1988 | 22 Sep 1995 | (2035) |
| Sizewell C | 1 | PWR | EPR | Planned | 1600 | (2025) | | |
| Sizewell C | 2 | PWR | EPR | Planned | 1600 | (2025) | | |
| Torness | 1 | GCR | AGR | Operational | 595 | 1 Aug 1980 | 25 May 1988 | (2030) |
| Torness | 2 | GCR | AGR | Operational | 595 | 1 Aug 1980 | 3 Feb 1989 | (2030) |
| Trawsfynydd | 1 | GCR | Magnox | Shut down/in decommissioning | 195 | 1 Jul 1959 | 24 Mar 1965 | 6 Feb 1991 |
| Trawsfynydd | 2 | GCR | Magnox | Shut down/in decommissioning | 195 | 1 Jul 1959 | 24 Mar 1965 | 4 Feb 1991 |
| Winfrith | 1 | SGHWR | SGHWR | Shut down/in decommissioning | 92 | 1 May 1963 | 1 Jan 1968 | 11 Sep 1990 |
| Wylfa | 1 | GCR | Magnox | Shut down/in decommissioning | 490 | 1 Sep 1963 | 1 Nov 1971 | 30 Dec 2015 |
| Wylfa | 2 | GCR | Magnox | Shut down/in decommissioning | 490 | 1 Sep 1963 | 3 Jan 1972 | 25 Apr 2012 |
