= 1999 Blayais Nuclear Power Plant flood =

1999 flooding of the Blayais Nuclear Power Plant

Coordinates: 45.255833°N 0.693056°W

Location of the Blayais Nuclear Power Plant

The 1999 Blayais Nuclear Power Plant flood was a flood that took place on the evening of December 27, 1999. It was caused when a combination of the tide and high winds from the extratropical storm Martin led to overwhelming of the seawalls of the Blayais Nuclear Power Plant in France. The event resulted in the loss of the plant's off-site power supply and knocked out several safety-related systems, resulting in a Level 2 event on the International Nuclear Event Scale. The incident illustrated the potential for flooding to damage multiple items of equipment throughout a plant, weaknesses in safety measures, systems and procedures, and resulted in fundamental changes to the evaluation of flood risk at nuclear power plants and in the precautions taken. It was in some sense a forerunner of the 2011 Fukushima I nuclear accidents in Japan, but did not trigger the worldwide protection work on low-lying plants that the latter would.

== Background ==
The Blayais plant, equipped with four pressurized water reactors, is located on the Gironde estuary near Blaye, South Western France, and is operated by Électricité de France. Due to records of over 200 floods along the estuary dating back to 585 AD, some 40 of which had been particularly extensive, the location of the plant was known to be susceptible to flooding, and reports of the 1875 floods mentioned that they were caused by a combination of a high tides and violent winds blowing along the axis of the estuary. The area had also experienced flooding during storms in the recent past, on December 13, 1981 and March 18, 1988. An official report on the 1981 floods, published in 1982, noted that it 'would be dangerous to underestimate' the combined effects of tide and storm, and also noted that the wind had led to 'the formation of real waves on the lower flooded floodplain'.

When the Blayais plant was designed in the 1970s, it was on the basis that a height of 4.0 m (13.1 ft) above NGF level would provide an 'enhanced safety level', and the base on which the plant was built was set at 4.5 m (15 ft) above NGF, although some components were located in basements at lower levels. The protective sea walls around the Blayais plant were originally built to be 5.2 m (17 ft) above NGF level at the front of the site, and 4.75 m (15.6 ft) along the sides. The 1998 annual review of plant safety for the plant identified the need for the sea walls to be raised to 5.7 m (19 ft) above NGF, and envisaged that this would be carried out in 2000, although EDF later postponed the work until 2002. On 29 November 1999, the Regional Directorate for Industry, Research and the Environment sent a letter to EDF asking them to explain this delay.

== Flooding ==
On December 27, 1999, a combination of the incoming tide and exceptionally high winds produced by Storm Martin caused a sudden rise of water in the estuary, flooding parts of the plant. The flooding began at around 7:30 pm, two hours before high tide, and it was later found that at its height the water had reached between 5.0 m (16.4 ft) and 5.3 m (17 ft) above NGF. The flooding also damaged the sea wall facing the Gironde, with the upper portion of the rock armour being washed away.

Prior to the flooding, units 1, 2 and 4 were at full power, while unit 3 was shut down for refuelling. Starting from 7:30 pm all four units lost their 225 kV power supplies, while units 2 and 4 also lost their 400 kV power supplies. The isolator circuits that should have allowed units 2 and 4 to supply themselves with electricity also failed, causing these two reactors to automatically shut down, and diesel backup generators started up, maintaining power to plants 2 and 4 until the 400 kV supply was restored at around 10:20 pm. In the pumping room for unit 1, one set of the two pairs of pumps in the Essential Service Water System failed due to flooding; had both sets failed then the safety of plant would have been endangered. In both units 1 and 2, flooding in the fuel rooms put the low-head safety injection pumps and the containment spray pumps, part of the Emergency Core Cooling System (a back-up system in case of coolant loss) out of use. Over the following days, an estimated 90,000 m^{3} (3,200,000 ft^{3}) of water would be pumped out of the flooded buildings.

== Response ==
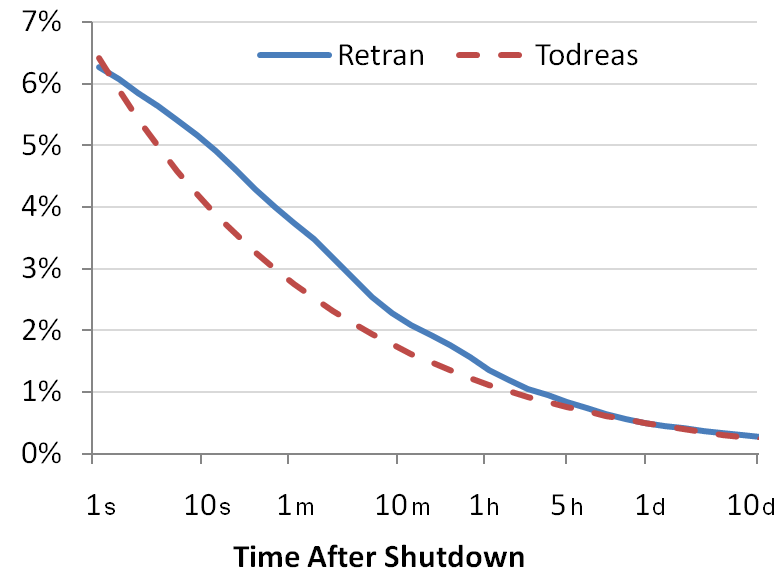
It takes several days for all the decay heat to subside after a reactor is SCRAMed, during which the heat must be removed by cooling systems

Around two and a half hours after the flooding began, a high-tide alarm for the estuary was triggered in the observation room of plant 4, although those in the other plants failed to activate. This should have caused the control room operators to launch a 'Level 2 Internal Emergency Plan', however this was not done as the requirement had been omitted from the operation room manual; instead they continued to follow the procedure for the loss of the off-site power supply, so failing to shut down the operating reactors at the earliest opportunity to allow the decay heat to start to dissipate. At 3:00 am on December 28, the power plant's emergency teams were called to reinforce the staff already on site; at 6:30 the management of the Institute for Nuclear Protection and Safety (now part of the Radioprotection and Nuclear Safety Institute) were informed, and a meeting of experts was convened at the IPSN at 7:45 am. At 9:00 am the Level 2 Internal Emergency Plan was finally activated by the Directorate of Nuclear Installation Safety (now the Nuclear Safety Authority) and a full emergency management team of 25 people was formed, working in shifts around the clock. At noon on December 28, the incident was provisionally rated at 'level 1' on the International Nuclear Event Scale before being reclassified at 'level 2' the following day. The team was scaled back during December 30, and stood down around 6 pm the same day.

During the morning of December 28, the Institute for Nuclear Protection and Safety estimated that, if the emergency cooling water supply failed, there would have been over 10 hours in which to act before core meltdown started.

On 5 January, the regional newspaper Sud-Ouest ran the following headline without being contradicted: "Very close to a major accident", explaining that a catastrophe had been narrowly avoided.

A report on a number of samples taken after the flooding on January 8 and 9 found that the event had had no quantifiable effect on radiation levels.

== Aftermath ==
The Institute for Nuclear Protection and Safety issued a report on January 17, 2000, calling for a review of the data used to calculate the height of the surface on which nuclear power stations are built. It suggested that two criteria should be met: that buildings containing equipment important for safety should be built on a surface at least as high as the highest water level plus a safety margin (the cote majorée de sécurité or 'enhanced safety height'), and that any such buildings below this level should be sealed to prevent water ingress. It also contained an initial analysis which found that, in addition to Blayais, the plants as Belleville, Chinon, Dampierre, Gravelines and Saint-Laurent were all below the 'enhanced safety height' and that their safety measures should be re-examined. It also found that although the plants at Bugey, Cruas, Flamanville, Golfech, Nogent, Paluel, Penly and Saint-Alban met the first criterion, the second should be verified; and called for the plants at Fessenheim and Tricastin to be re-examined since they were below the level of major adjacent canals. The consequent upgrading work, implemented over the following years, is estimated to have cost approximately 110,000,000 euro.

In Germany, the flooding prompted the Federal Ministry for Environment, Nature Conservation and Nuclear Safety to order an evaluation of the German nuclear power plants.

Following the events at Blayais, a new method of evaluating flood risk was developed. Instead of evaluating only the five factors required by Rule RFS I.2.e (river flood, dam failure, tide, storm surge and tsunami), a further eight factors are now also evaluated: waves caused by wind on the sea; waves caused by wind on river or channel; swelling due to the operation of valves or pumps; deterioration of water retaining structures (other than dams); circuit or equipment failure; brief and intense rainfall on site; regular and continuous rainfall on site; and rises in groundwater. In addition, realistic combinations of such factors are taken into account.

Among the remedial actions taken at Blayais itself, the sea walls were raised to 8.0 m (26.2 ft) above NFG, – up to 3.25 m (10.7 ft) higher than before – and openings have been sealed to prevent water ingress.

=== Protests ===
Twelve days prior to the floods, a local anti-nuclear group was formed by Stéphane Lhomme under the TchernoBlaye banner (a portmanteau of the French spelling of Chernobyl and Blaye, the nearest town). The group gained support following the flood and their first protest march of between 1,000 and 1,500 people took place on April 23, but was blocked from reaching the plant by police using tear gas. The group continue their opposition to the plant, still under the presidency of Stéphane Lhomme.

== Ongoing concerns ==
The remedial works are believed to now adequately protect the plant from flooding, but the access roadway remains low-lying and vulnerable. Due to this, particularly since the 2011 Fukushima I nuclear accidents in Japan, concerns have been raised over the potential difficulty of getting help to the plant in an emergency.

The seawalls at Blayais are now higher than the tsunami that hit Japan, knocking out the cooling systems at Fukushima Dai-ichi. The adequacy of the sea walls has, however, been disputed by Professor Jean-Noël Salomon, head of the Laboratory of Applied Physical Geography at Michel de Montaigne University Bordeaux 3. He believes that, due to the potential harm and economic cost that would result from a future flood-related disaster, the sea walls should be designed to withstand simultaneous extreme events, rather than simultaneous major events.

== See also ==
- Fukushima I nuclear accidents
- Nuclear power in France
- Nuclear safety
- List of civilian nuclear accidents
- List of civilian nuclear incidents
- Risk assessment
