= Saint-Laurent-des-Eaux =

Coordinates: 47°43′N 1°36′E

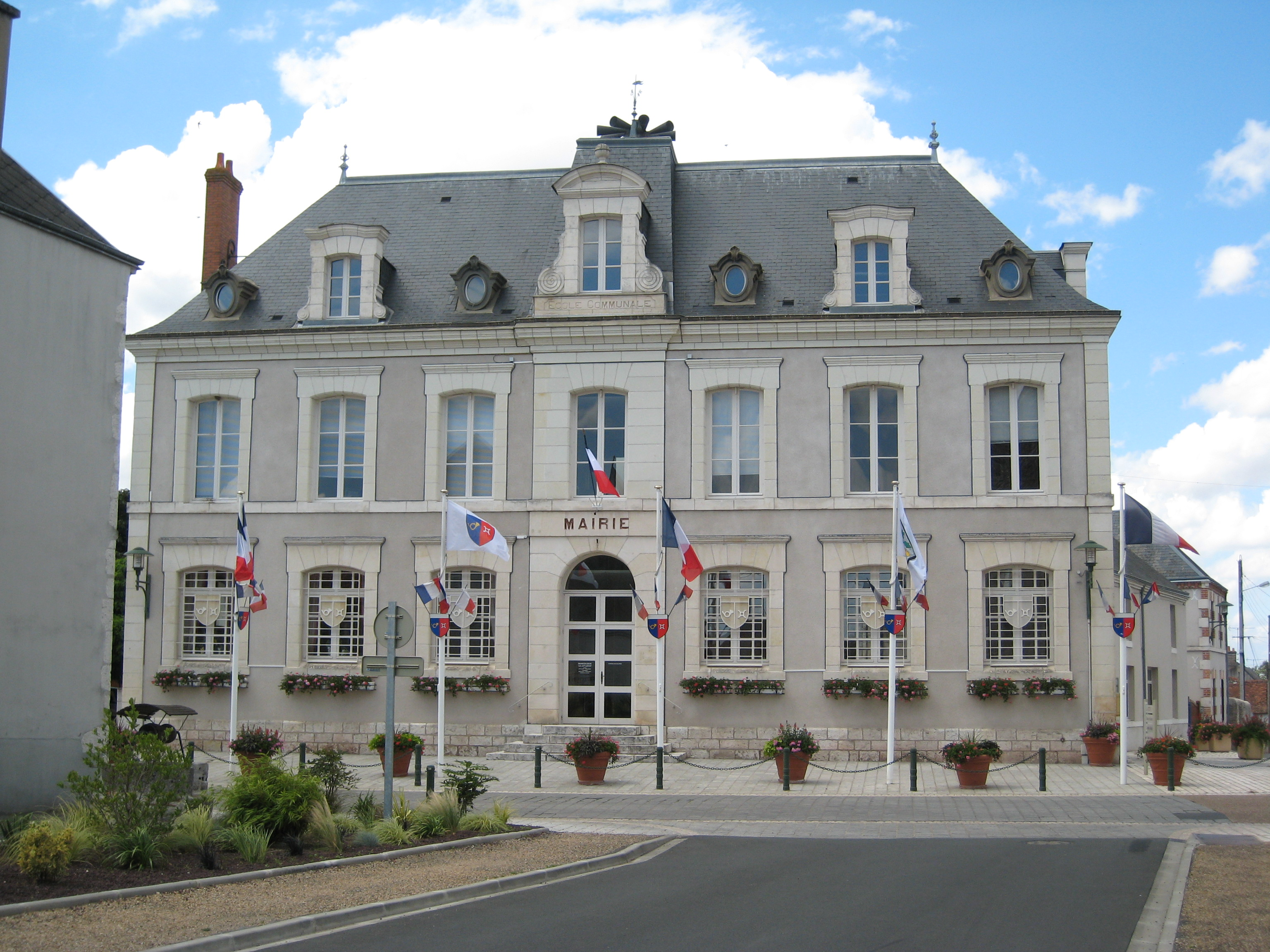
Former town hall of Saint-Laurent-des-Eaux

Saint-Laurent-des-Eaux (French pronunciation: [sɛ̃ lɔʁɑ̃ dez‿o]) is a former commune of the Loir-et-Cher department of France. In 1972, it was merged with Nouan-sur-Loire to form the new commune of Saint-Laurent-Nouan.

The Saint-Laurent Nuclear Power Plant is located here, it comprises:

- Two UNGG reactors, now closed. These entered service in 1969 and 1971, and were closed in 1990 and 1992.
- Two PWRs, each of 900 MWe, which entered service in 1983.
