= Online refuelling =

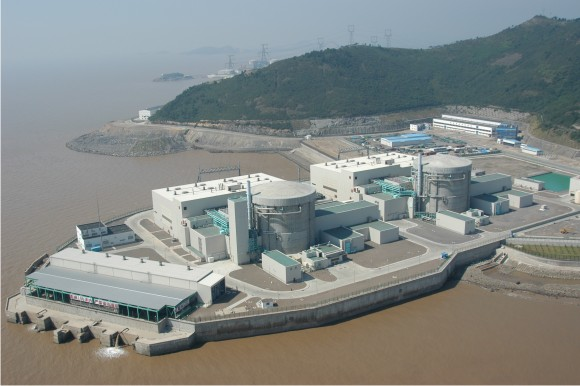
CANDU reactors are an example of a reactor design able to undergo online refueling.

In nuclear power technology, online refuelling is a technique for changing the fuel of a nuclear reactor while the reactor is critical. This allows the reactor to continue to generate electricity during routine refuelling, and therefore improve the availability and profitability of the plant.

== Benefits of online refuelling ==
Online refuelling allows a nuclear reactor to continue to generate electricity during periods of routine refuelling, and therefore improves the availability and therefore the economy of the plant. Additionally, this allows for more flexibility in reactor refuelling schedules, exchanging a small number of fuel elements at a time rather than high-intensity offline refuelling programmes.

The ability to refuel a reactor while generating power has the greatest benefits where refuelling is required at high frequency, for example during the production of plutonium suitable for nuclear weapons during which low-burnup fuel is required from short irradiation periods in a reactor. Conversely, frequent rearrangement of fuel within the core can balance the thermal load and allow higher fuel burnup, therefore reducing both the fuel requirements, and subsequently the amount of high-level nuclear waste for disposal.

Although online refuelling is generally desirable, it requires design compromises which means that it is often uneconomical. This includes added complexity to refuelling equipment, and the requirement for these to pressurise during refuelling gas and water-cooled reactors. Online refuelling equipment for Magnox reactors proved to be less reliable than the reactor systems, and retrospectively its use was regarded as a mistake. Molten salt reactors and pebble-bed reactors also require online handling and processing equipment to replace the fuel during operation.

== Reactor designs with online refuelling ==
Reactors with online refuelling capability to date have typically been either liquid sodium cooled, gas cooled, or cooled by water in pressurised channels. Water-cooled reactors utilising pressurised vessels, for example PWR and BWR reactors and their Generation III descendants, are unsuitable for online refuelling as the coolant is depressurised to allow for disassembly of the pressure vessel and therefore requires a major reactor shutdown. This is typically carried out every 18–24 months.

Notable past and present nuclear power plant designs that have incorporated the ability to refuel online include:

- CANDU reactors: Pressurised heavy-water cooled and moderated, natural uranium fuel reactors of Canadian design. Operated 1947–present.
- IPHWR reactors: CANDU derived, Indian designed reactors. They are heavy water cooled and moderated. Operated 1984–present.
- Magnox reactors: CO_{2}-cooled, graphite-moderated, natural uranium fuel reactors of British design. Operated 1954–2015.
- RBMK reactors: Boiling water cooled, graphite-moderated, enriched uranium fuel reactors of Russian design. Operated 1974–present.
- UNGG reactors: CO_{2}-cooled, graphite-moderated, natural uranium fuel reactors of French design. Operated 1966 - 1994.
- BN-350; BN-600 & BN-800 reactors: Sodium cooled fast-breeder reactor of Russian design. Operated 1973–present.
- AGR (Advanced gas-cooled) reactors: CO_{2}-cooled, graphite-moderated, enriched uranium fuel reactors of British design. Operated 1976–present.
- Atucha, heavy-water cooled and moderated, use uranium at 0.85% enrichment. Operated 1974-present.

There are a number of planned reactor designs which include provision for online refuelling, including pebble-bed and molten salt Generation IV reactors.
