= Saint-Laurent Nuclear Power Plant =

Nuclear power plant located in France

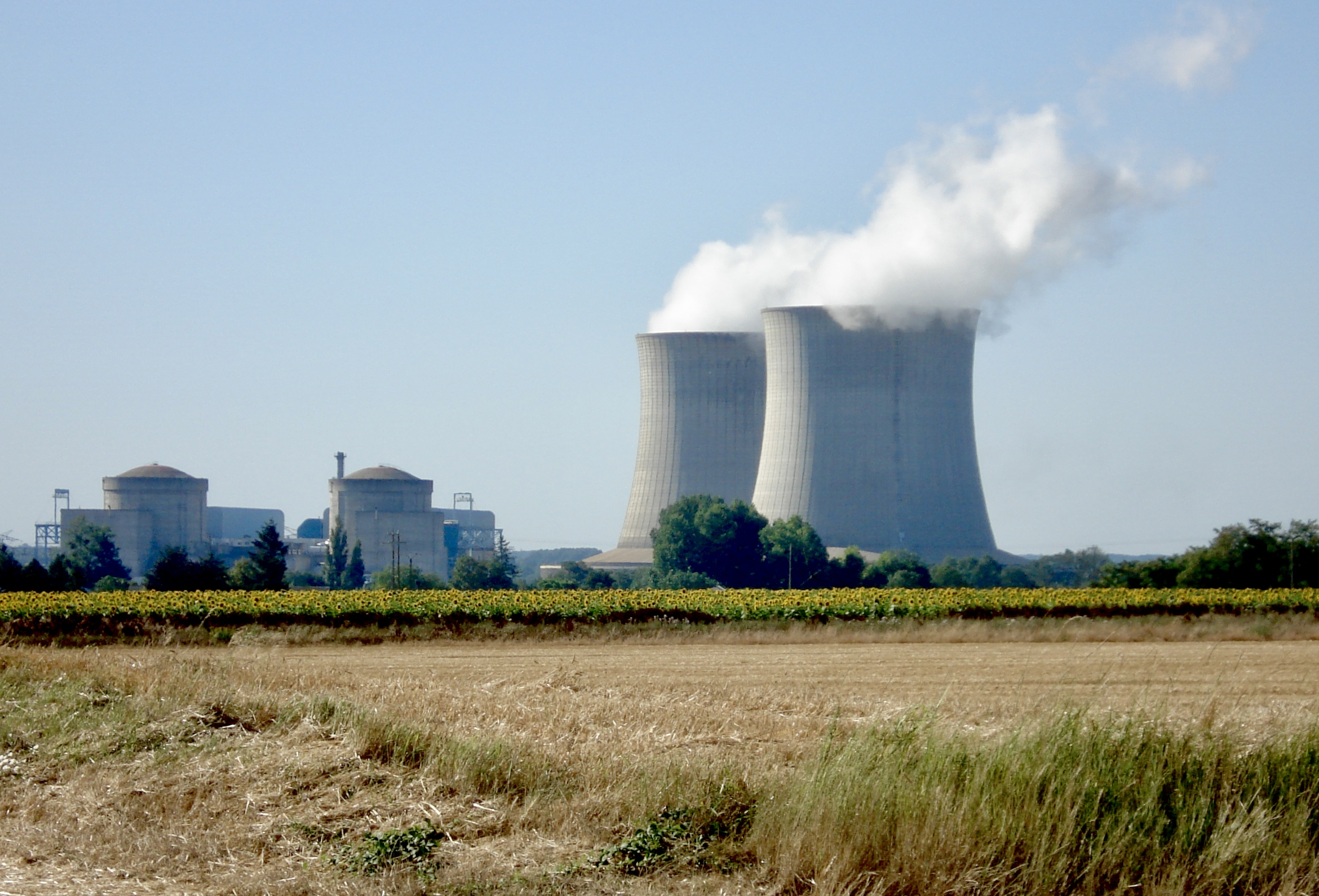
- Saint-Laurent Nuclear Power Plant
- Official name: Centrale Nucléaire de Saint-Laurent
- Country: France
- Location: Saint-Laurent-Nouan
- Coordinates: 47°43′12″N 01°34′39″E
- Status: Operational
- Construction began: 1963
- Commission date: 24 March 1969; 57 years ago (Saint-Laurent A); 1983; 43 years ago (Saint-Laurent B)
- Decommission date: 1990; 36 years ago (Saint-Laurent A-1); 1991; 35 years ago (Saint-Laurent A-2)
- Operator: EDF

Nuclear power station
- Reactor type: GCR (retired); PWR
- Reactor supplier: Framatome

Power generation
- Units operational: 2 x 956 MW
- Make and model: Alstom
- Units decommissioned: 1 x 390 MW; 1 x 450 MW
- Nameplate capacity: 1,912 MW
- Capacity factor: 77.1%
- Annual net output: 12,918 GW·h

External links
- Website: www.edf.fr/35075i/Accueilfr/InfosNucleaire/Planrapproche/Lessitesfrancais/Saint_Laurent.html
- Commons: Related media on Commons

The Saint-Laurent Nuclear Power Station is located in the commune of Saint-Laurent-Nouan in Loir-et-Cher on the Loire — 28 km (17 mi) upstream from Blois and 30 km (19 mi) downstream from Orléans.

The site includes two operating pressurized water reactors (each 900MWe), which began operation in 1983. They are cooled by the water of the Loire River.

Two retired UNGG reactors exist at the site, which were brought into service in 1969 and 1971 and were shut down in April 1990 and June 1992.

The site employs approximately 670 regular workers.

== Incidents ==
On 17 October 1969, 50 kg of uranium in one of the gas-cooled reactors began to melt. This event was classified at 4 on the International Nuclear Event Scale (INES), and is, as of December 2011, the most severe civil nuclear power accident in France.

On 13 March 1980, there was some annealing that occurred in the graphite of one of the reactors, causing a brief heat excursion. This was also classified as 4 on the INES and has been called another worst nuclear accident in France. Much later, the Institute of Marine Geochemistry at the École normale supérieure claimed that they found traces of plutonium in the river they believed was released in the 1980 or 1969 accident. However, tests conducted in 1993 by the IPSN and in 2003 by the IRSN determined that the levels of plutonium measured upstream and downstream from the power plant were similar and of the same order of magnitude, concluding that the presence of the plutonium was due to the fallout of aerial nuclear tests and not due to either the 1980 or 1969 accidents.

On the morning of 12 January 1987 at 9:30 am, due to the exceptional frost of Loire, ice clogged the water intakes from the central A1 (GCR) and resulted in the loss of normal cooling. This caused the automatic shutdown of the gas-graphite reactor. The cooling system needed to remove the residual power failed as the diesel generators failed to start. It was necessary to feed it by the western power grid of France. The generators were eventually returned to service, just before the collapse of the power grid which took place around noon after a failure of the thermal power plant at Cordemais. The army was then called in to use explosives and destroy the ice blocking the water intakes.

On 12 May 2004, radioactive sodium was released into the atmosphere during a leak test of new steam generators of one of the reactors at the B plant. The incident, which resulted in the automatic shutdown of the reactor, was of no consequence for the environment according to EDF. Sortir du nucléaire noted however that when the automatic shutdown of the reactor happened, the control rods remained blocked for unknown reasons.

On 19 August 2011, reactor #1 stopped after a failure.

== Flood risk ==
The initial report following the 1999 Blayais Nuclear Power Plant flood, identified the Saint-Laurent plant as being at risk of flooding, and called for its safety measures to be re-examined. Plans to build a flood wall around the site were made but abandoned, it is thought, due to the cost.

== Gallery ==
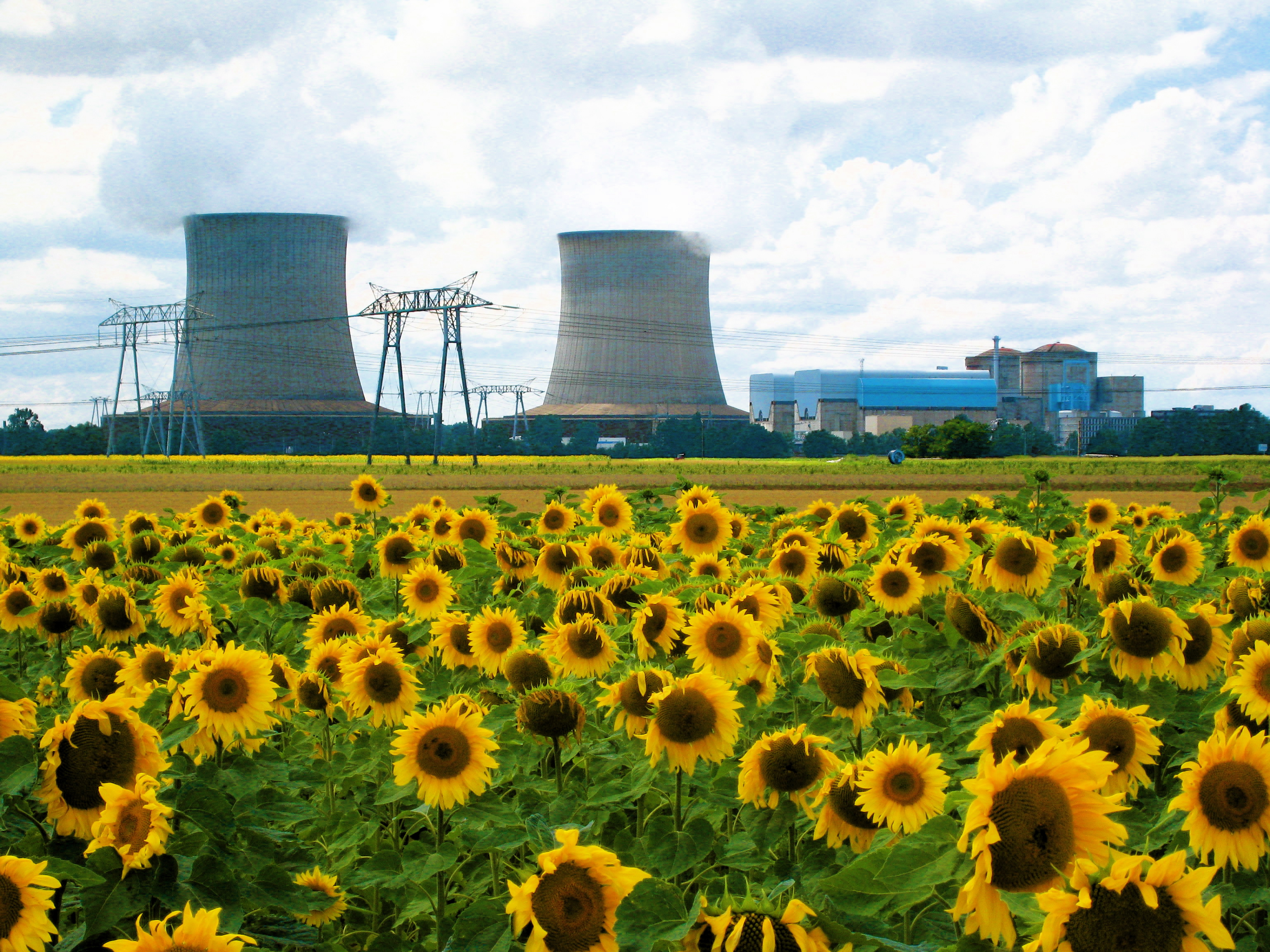
Sunflowers and the nuclear power station

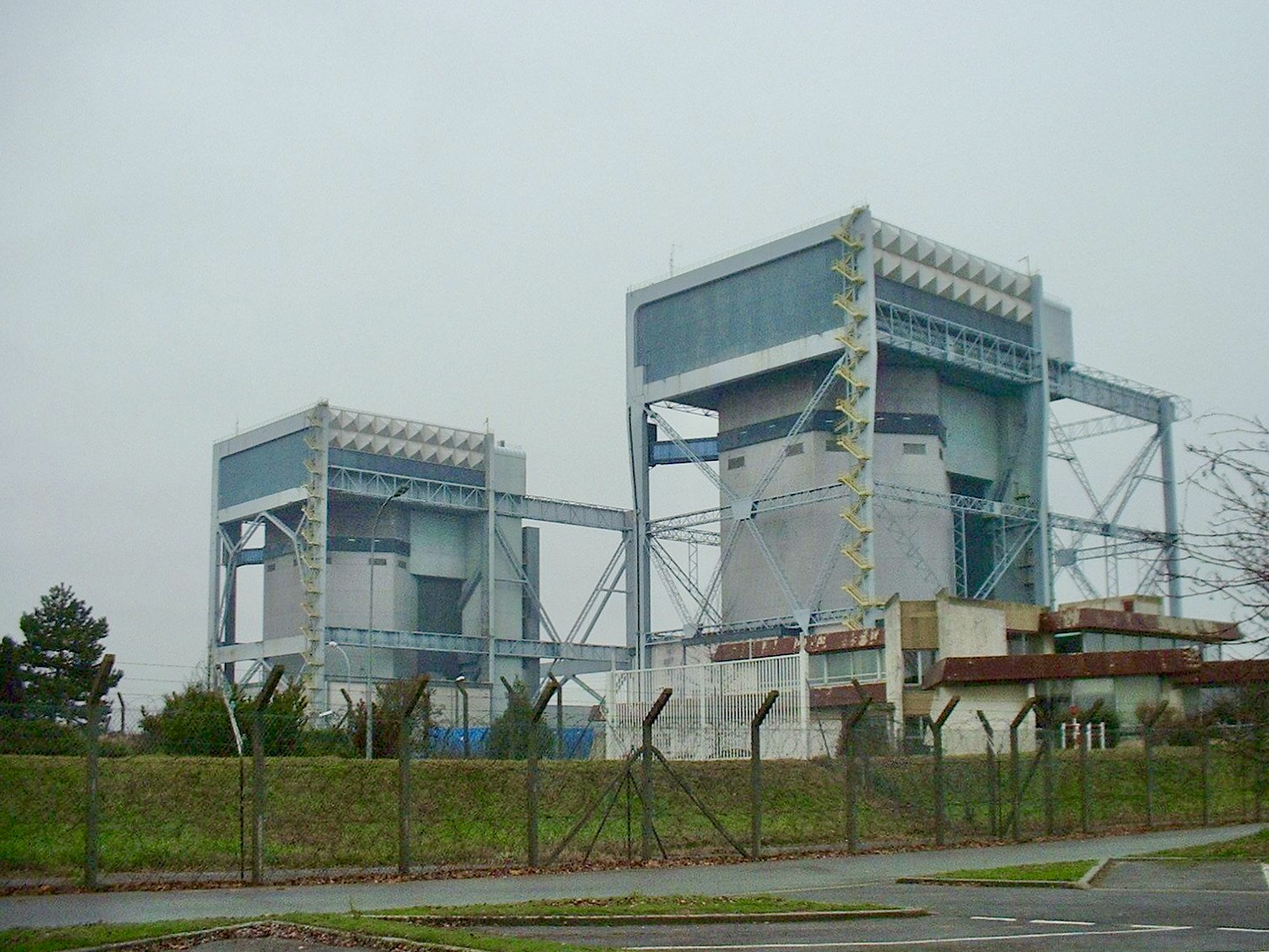
The two GGRs

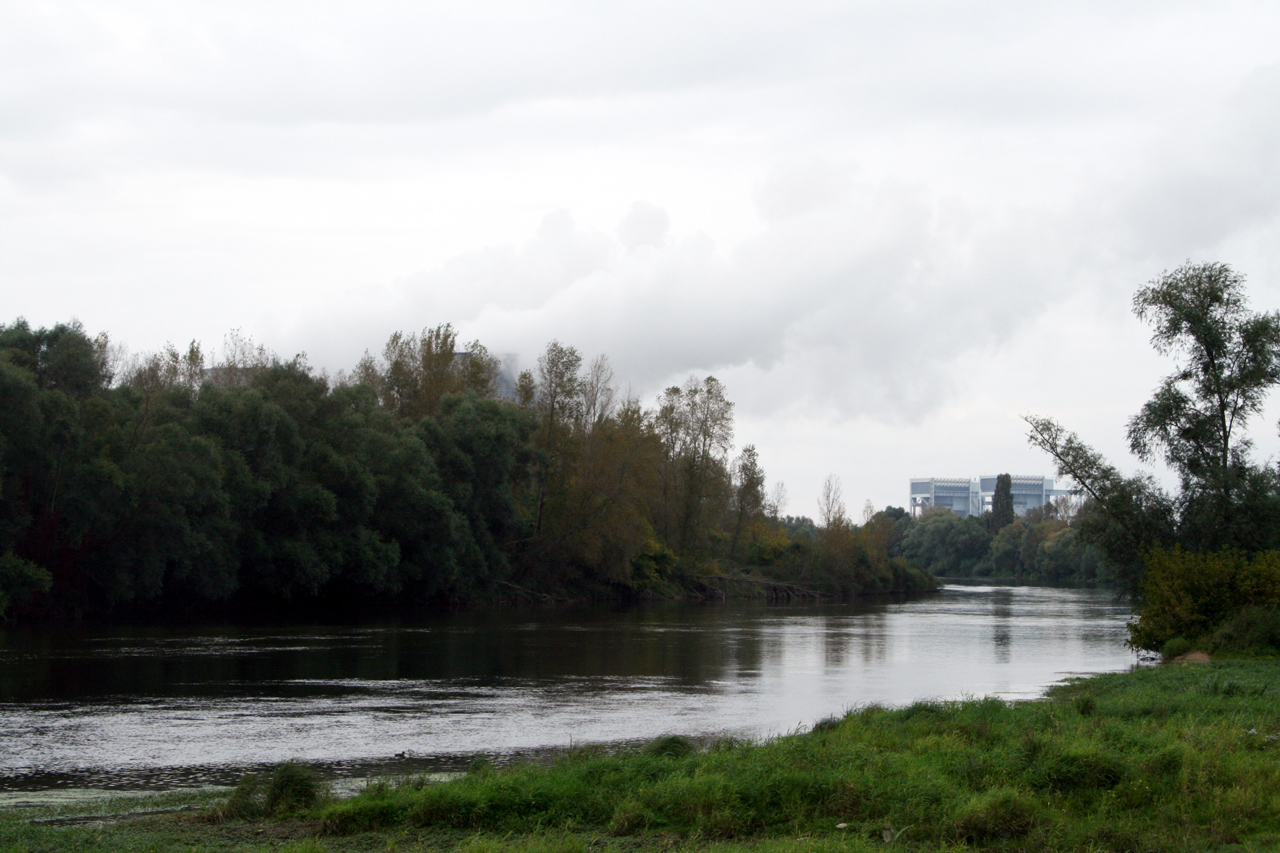
The two GGRs

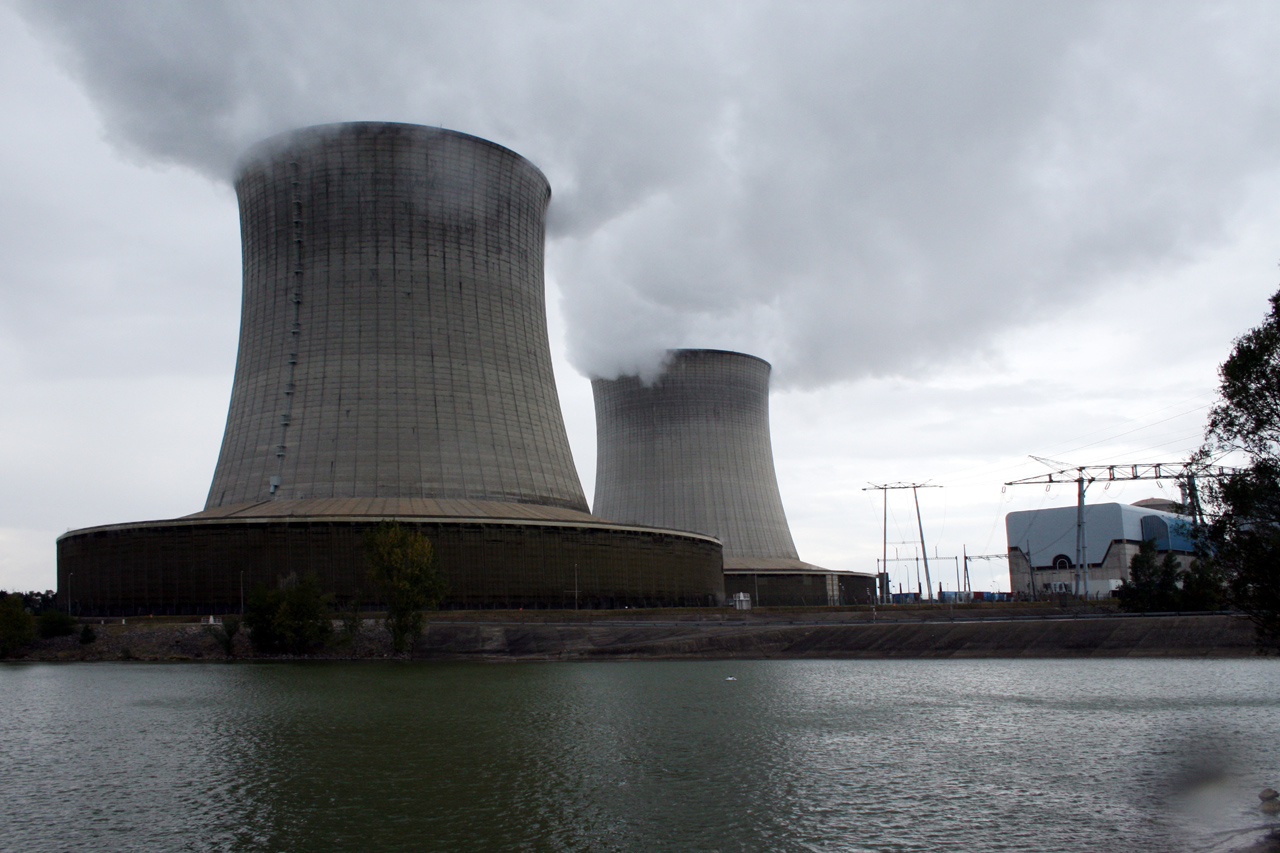
The nuclear power plant
