= December 1981 windstorm =

Storm affecting England, Wales, and France

The December 1981 windstorm was a severe storm that particularly affected southern England, Wales and south west France during 13 December 1981. The storm formed as a secondary low.

In England, the storm started with violent winds and snow, which reached Cornwall during the morning. Prior to its arrival a number of record low temperatures were reached for December, with -25.1C at RAF Shawbury in Shropshire and -5.9C in Southampton.

In the evening spring tides combined with a 1.45 m (4.8 ft) storm surge resulted in the highest water levels recorded in the Bristol Channel since the start of the 20th century. Water from melting snow, caused by milder weather accompanying the depression, added to the flooding. The maximum surge at Hinkley Point was measured at 1.3 metres (4 ft 3 in) above the 7.4 metres (24 ft) tidal level Ordnance Datum (OD) at 2025 hours, and 1.3 metres (4 ft 3 in) measured at Avonmouth. The wind was measured at 40 knots (74 km/h; 46 mph) from the west. Over topping of the sea defences along a 7 miles (11 km) stretch of the North Somerset coast at 22 locations from Clevedon to Porlock began after 19:30, and continued until about 21:30 when the wind speed had reached 50 knots (93 km/h; 58 mph) from the west. Although there was no loss of life, the resultant flooding covered 12,500 acres (5,100 ha) of land, affecting 1072 houses and commercial properties, with £150,000 worth of livestock killed and £50,000 of feed and grain destroyed. Wessex Water Authority estimated the total cost of the damage caused at £6m, resulting in a three-year programme of sea defence assessment, repair and improvement.

In France, the storm caused widespread flooding in the south west, causing considerable damage in the river basins of the Garonne and Adour and flooding the city of Bordeaux.

The MV Bonita, an 8000 tonne Ecuadorian cargo ship sailing from Hamburg to Panama was caught in the storm in the English Channel. 29 were rescued from the ship, 4 by helicopter until the storm was too strong for the helicopter to operate. The remaining crew were rescued by the Guernsey lifeboat, however there were 2 fatalities.

Water entered the cooling water pump house of Hinkley Point nuclear power station, causing a shut-down for weeks after the storm.

== See also ==
- Penlee lifeboat disaster -a storm 6 days later, on 19 December 1981
- Great Storm of 1987
- Bristol Channel floods, 1607
- 1999 Blayais Nuclear Power Plant flood - caused by a similar storm
- European windstorm
