= Niederaichbach Nuclear Power Plant =

Former nuclear power plant in Germany

Niederaichbach Nuclear Power Station
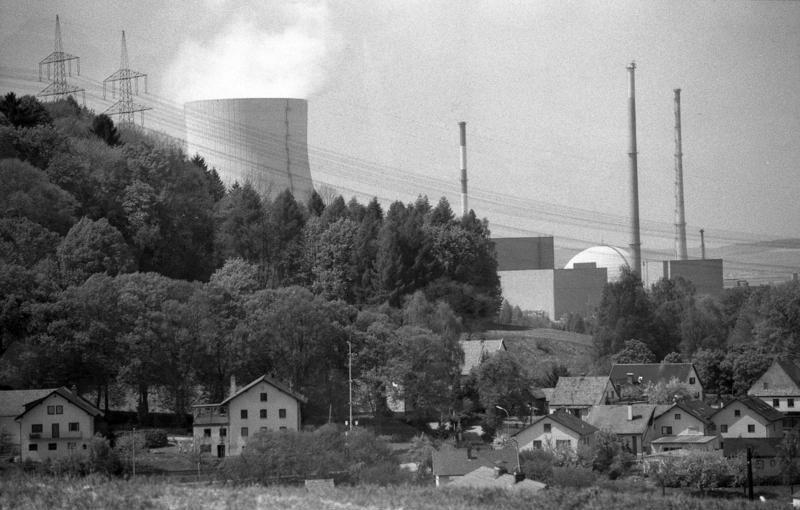
- Reactor building (far right) during decommissioning
- Official name: Kernkraftwerk Niederaichbach
- Country: Germany
- Location: Niederaichbach
- Coordinates: 48°36′17″N 12°18′14″E
- Status: Decommissioned
- Construction began: June 1, 1966
- Commission date: January 1, 1973
- Decommission date: July 21, 1974
- Construction cost: 230,000,000 DM
- Owner: Karlsruhe Institute of Technology
- Operator: Kernkraftwerk Niederaichbach GMBH

Nuclear power station
- Reactors: 1 x 106 MWe
- Reactor type: Heavy Water Gas Cooled Reactor
- Thermal capacity: 321 MWt

Power generation
- Capacity factor: 1.1%

Niederaichbach Nuclear Power Plant (German: Kernkraftwerk Niederaichbach (KKN)) was a German nuclear plant in Niederaichbach, Bavaria. The plant consisted of one heavy water gas cooled (HWGC) reactor with a gross capacity of 106 MW_{e}. Safety and maintenance issues caused the reactor to be decommissioned after only a year and a half in operation. It was the first nuclear plant in Europe to be completely decommissioned, with the final work being completed in autumn 1995.

Although located at the same location as the Isar Nuclear Power Plant, the Niederaichbach plant used a different reactor type and was decommissioned five years before construction of the Isar plant was completed.

== History ==
In the late 1950s the government of Bavaria became interested in developing nuclear power within the state. Construction began in 1966. Only a year later, Hans Matthöfer, German Minister of Education and Technology, remarked that the project had "No technological future", due to the limitations of its experimental HWGC reactor. Nevertheless, construction continued, with others in the Bavarian government hopeful that its construction and operation would provide much needed technological and operational experience.

Construction was completed in 1972 at the cost of 230 million Deutsche Marks. It began operation in 1973, but struggled to produce anywhere close to its capacity. After problems with the steam turbines in mid-1974 the reactor was taken offline and decommissioned. In its year and a half of operation it generated only 20,000 MWh of energy, equivalent to just 18 days of full capacity operation or a capacity factor of just 1.1%.

== Decommissioning ==
In mid-1974 the reactor was first placed into SAFSTOR for decontamination, and its fuel was transferred to CEA for disposal. From 1975 to 1995 the reactor structure was demolished, returning the area to its greenfield condition. This was the first reactor in Europe to be completely decommissioned in this manner. It cost 280 million DM to demolish and remediate the area, more than its construction cost.

After its decommissioning, German development of heavy water reactors was halted.

Today a monument marks its former location near the current Isar Nuclear Power Plant.
