= General levelling of France =

Vertical datum used in France

Coordinates: 43°16′42″N 5°21′12″E

The General Levelling of France (French: nivellement général de la France, NGF) forms a network of benchmarks in mainland France and Corsica, now overseen by the Institut Géographique National. It is now the official levelling network in mainland France. It is made up of two networks:

- NGF - IGN69 for mainland France, with the 'zero level' determined by the tide gauge at Marseille
- NGF - IGN78 for Corsica, with the 'zero level' determined by the tide gauge at Ajaccio
