= Saint-Laurent-Nouan =

- Commune
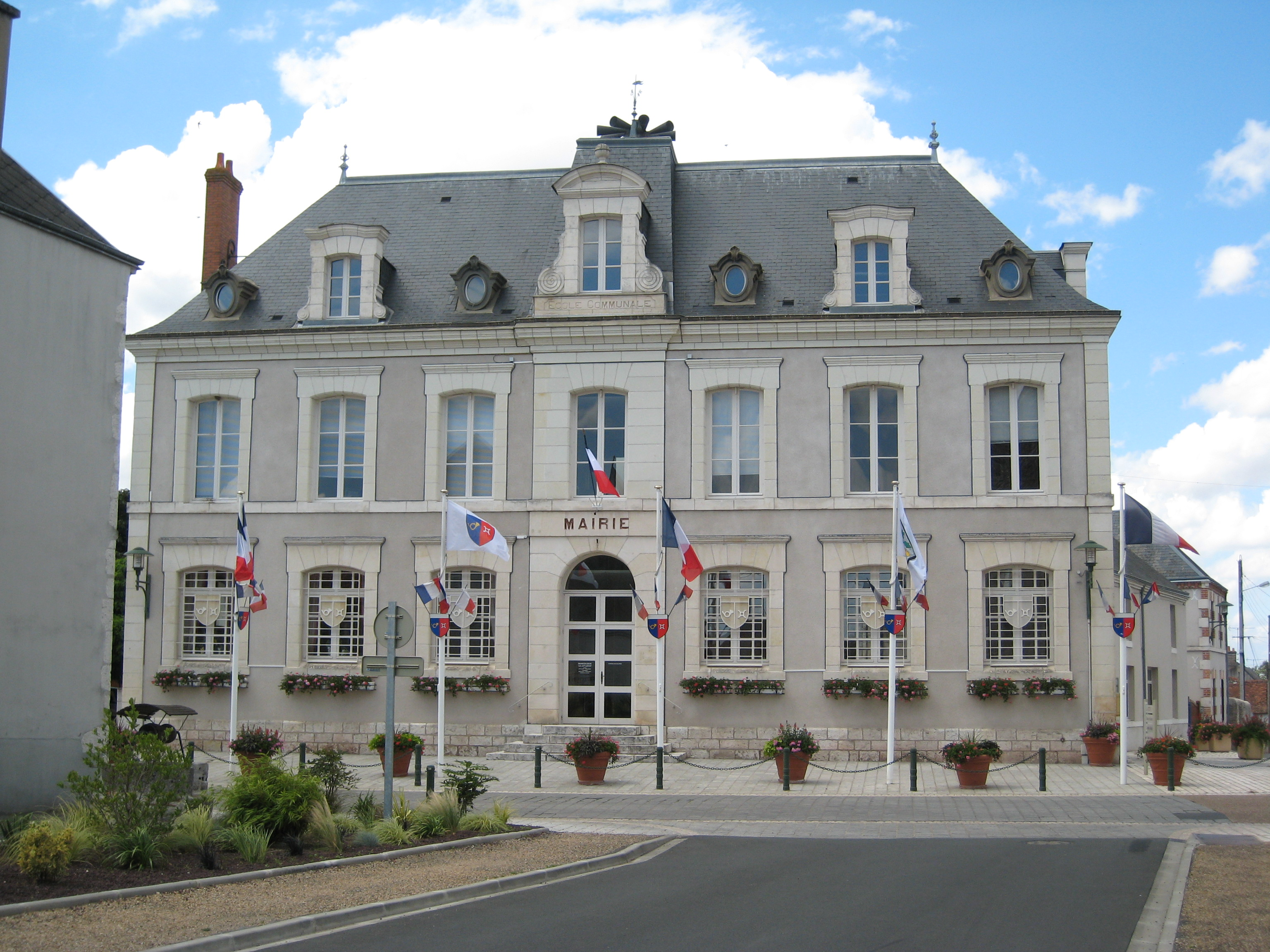
- Town hall

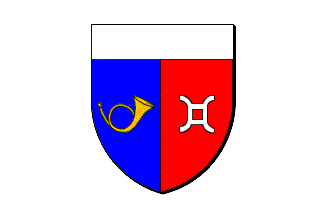
- Flag Coat of arms
- Location of Saint-Laurent-Nouan
- Location within France Location within Centre-Val de Loire
- Coordinates: 47°43′03″N 1°36′45″E
- Country: France
- Region: Centre-Val de Loire
- Department: Loir-et-Cher
- Arrondissement: Blois
- Canton: Chambord
- Intercommunality: Grand Chambord

Government
  - Mayor (2020–2026): Michel Laurent
- Area^{1}: 60.98 km^{2} (23.54 sq mi)
- Elevation: 93 m (305 ft)
- Highest elevation: 112 m (367 ft)
- Lowest elevation: 72 m (236 ft)
- Population (2023): 4,236
  - Density: 69.47/km^{2} (179.9/sq mi)
- Time zone: UTC+01:00 (CET)
  - Summer (DST): UTC+02:00 (CEST)
- INSEE/Postal code: 41220 /41220
- ^{1} French Land Register data, which excludes lakes, ponds, glaciers > 1 km^{2} (0.386 sq mi or 247 acres) and river estuaries.

Saint-Laurent-Nouan (French pronunciation: [sɛ̃ lɔʁɑ̃ nwɑ̃], [nuɑ̃]) is a commune in the Loir-et-Cher department, central France.

== History ==
Saint-Laurent-Nouan was formed in 1972 from the merger of the two former communes, Saint-Laurent-des-Eaux and Nouan-sur-Loire.

== Population ==
Population data before 1972 refer to the former commune of Saint-Laurent-des-Eaux.

Historical population

Year	Pop.	±% p.a.
1793	972	—
1821	1,020	+0.17%
1846	1,410	+1.30%
1872	1,657	+0.62%
1901	1,308	−0.81%
1926	1,060	−0.84%
1946	1,038	−0.10%
1962	992	−0.28%
1968	1,725	+9.66%

Year	Pop.	±% p.a.
1975	2,139	+3.12%
1982	3,079	+5.34%
1990	3,399	+1.24%
1999	3,686	+0.90%
2007	4,153	+1.50%
2012	4,268	+0.55%
2017	4,357	+0.41%
2023	4,236	−0.47%

Source: EHESS and INSEE (1975-2023)

== See also ==
- Communes of the Loir-et-Cher department
