= Bugey Nuclear Power Plant =

Nuclear power plant in France

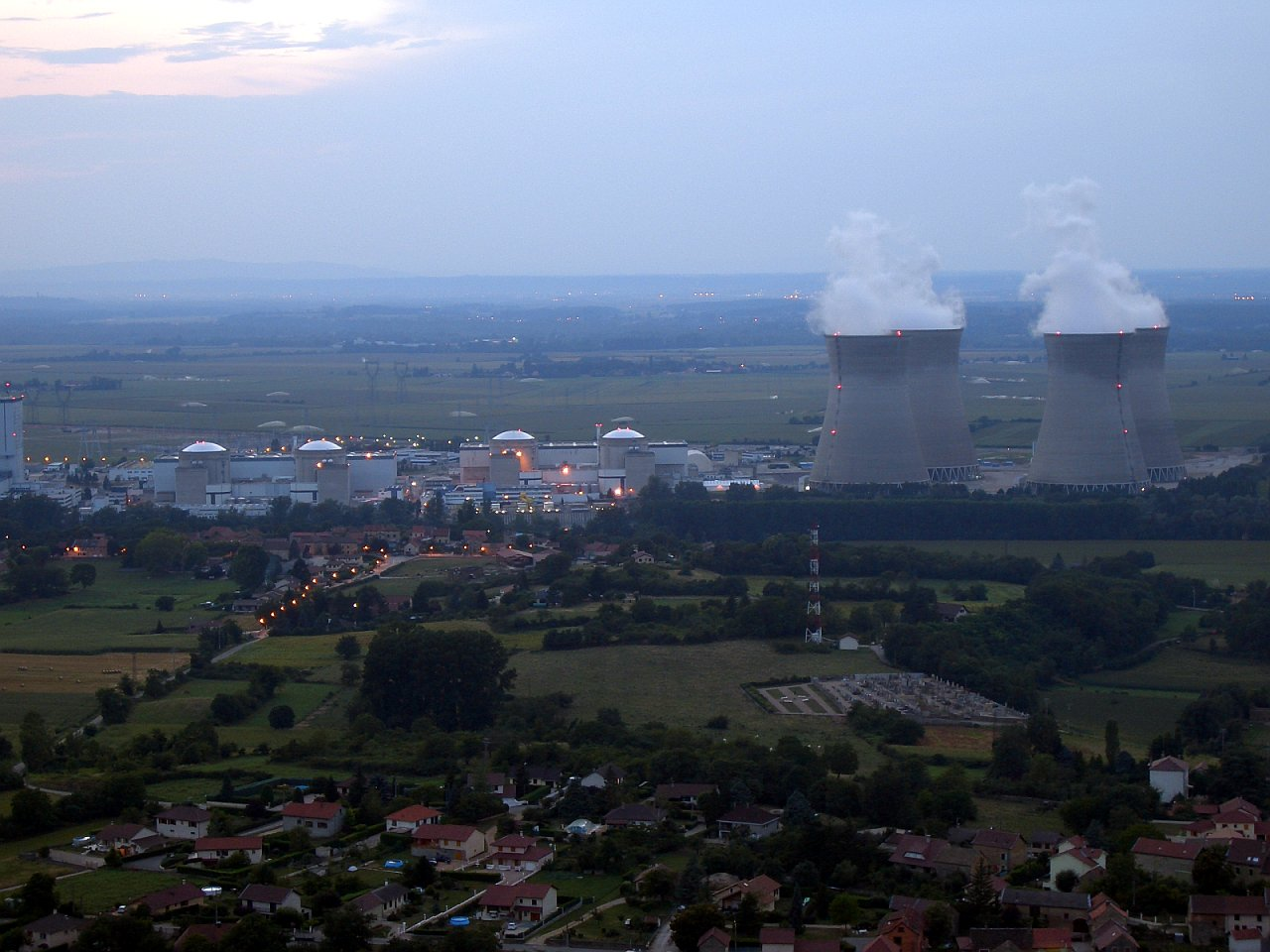
- Bugey Nuclear Power Plant
- Country: France
- Coordinates: 45°47′54″N 5°16′15″E
- Status: Operational
- Construction began: 1964
- Commission date: 15 April 1972; 53 years ago
- Owner: EDF
- Operator: EDF
- Employees: 1,703 (2017)

Nuclear power station
- Reactors: 5
- Reactor type: PWR

Power generation
- Units operational: 2 × 910 MW; 2 × 880 MW
- Make and model: pressurized water reactor (83)
- Units decommissioned: 1 × 540 MW
- Nameplate capacity: 3580 MW
- Capacity factor: 78.6%
- Annual net output: 25,654 GW·h

External links
- Website: edf.fr/ ... /Bugey.html
- Commons: Related media on Commons

The Bugey Nuclear Power Plant is located in Bugey in the Saint-Vulbas commune (Ain), about 75 km from the Swiss border. The site occupies 100 hectares. It is on the edge of the Rhône River, from where it gets its cooling water, and is about 35 km upstream from Lyon and 72 km from Grenoble. About 1,200 people work at the site.

The site houses 4 currently operating units, all being pressurized water reactors. The 5th reactor (unit 1) is currently being dismantled. It was the last UNGG reactor built in the world.

Some of the cooling comes from direct use of the Rhône water (units 2 and 3) while some is done by the use of cooling towers (units 4 and 5).

== Seismic activity ==
The area is not known for its seismic activity.

In the last few years, the plant was modernized to updated earthquake resistance standards.

== Heat dumping ==
During the heat wave on 20 July 2003, waste heat water was piped into the Rhône, which is permitted, in extreme cases, for about 2 hours and the maximum heat difference was 0.9 degrees Celsius. Again on 30 July 2003, water was directly discharged into the Rhône for 9 hours.

== Reactor units ==
Reactor Unit	Type	Average Output	Rated Power	Began construction	Finish construction	Commercial operation	Close of reactor
Bugey 1	UNGG (gas-cooled)	540 MW	555 MW	1 December 1965	15 April 1972	1 July 1972	27 May 1994
Bugey 2	CP0 (PWR)	910 MW	945 MW	1 November 1972	10 May 1978	1 March 1979	Qualified to operate until 2029
Bugey 3	CP0 (PWR)	910 MW	945 MW	1 September 1973	21 September 1978	1 March 1979	Qualified to operate until April 2024
Bugey 4	CP0 (PWR)	880 MW	917 MW	1 June 1974	8 March 1979	1 July 1979	Qualified to operate until December 2021
Bugey 5	CP0 (PWR)	880 MW	917 MW	1 July 1974	31 July 1979	30 January 1980	Qualified to operate until June 2022

Bugey 5 was offline from August 2015 to July 2017 due to an air leak in the inner liner of its containment.

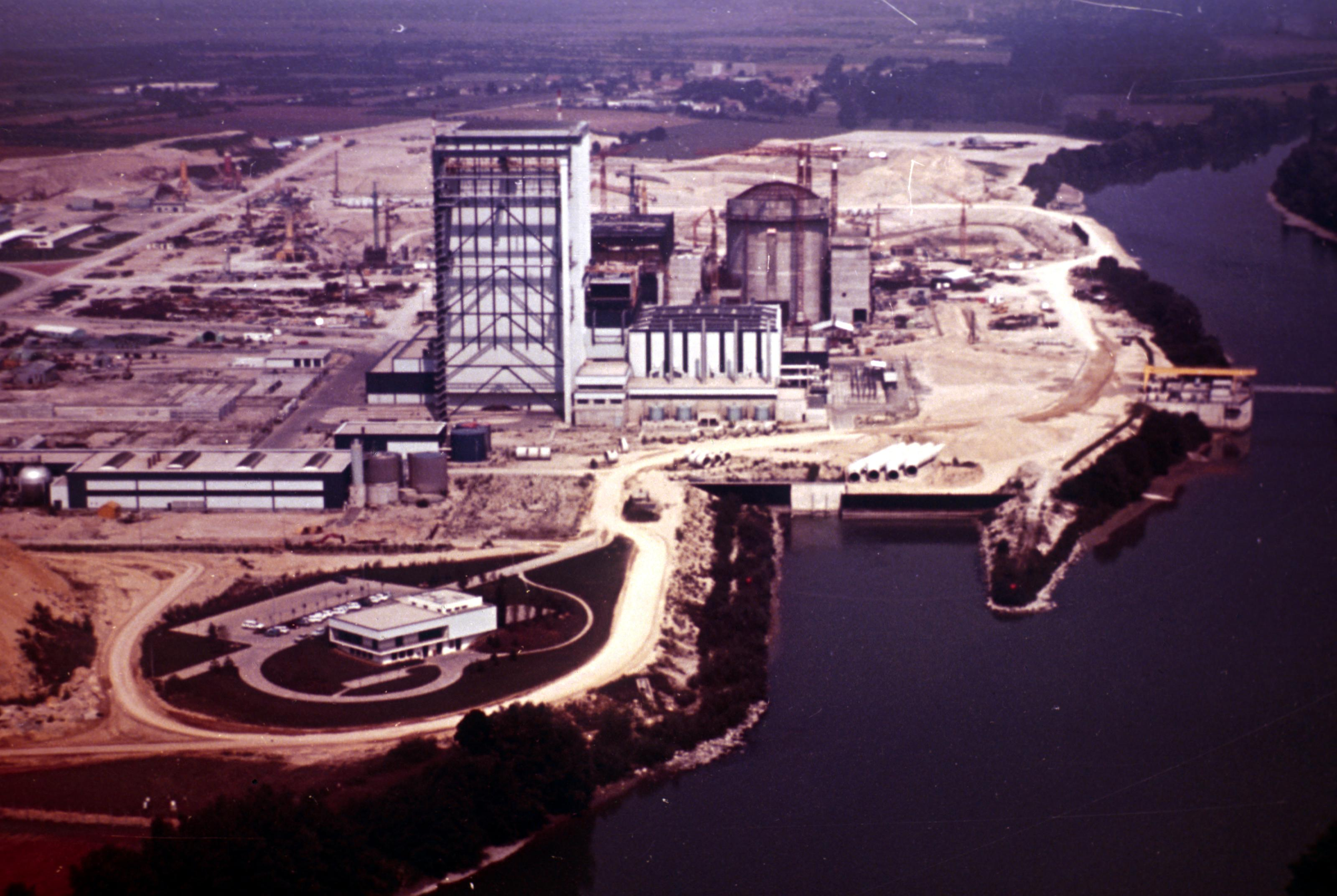
Reactor 1 (UNGG) in the foreground, with reactors 2 and 3 under construction in the background
