= Chinon Nuclear Power Plant =

Nuclear power plant in France

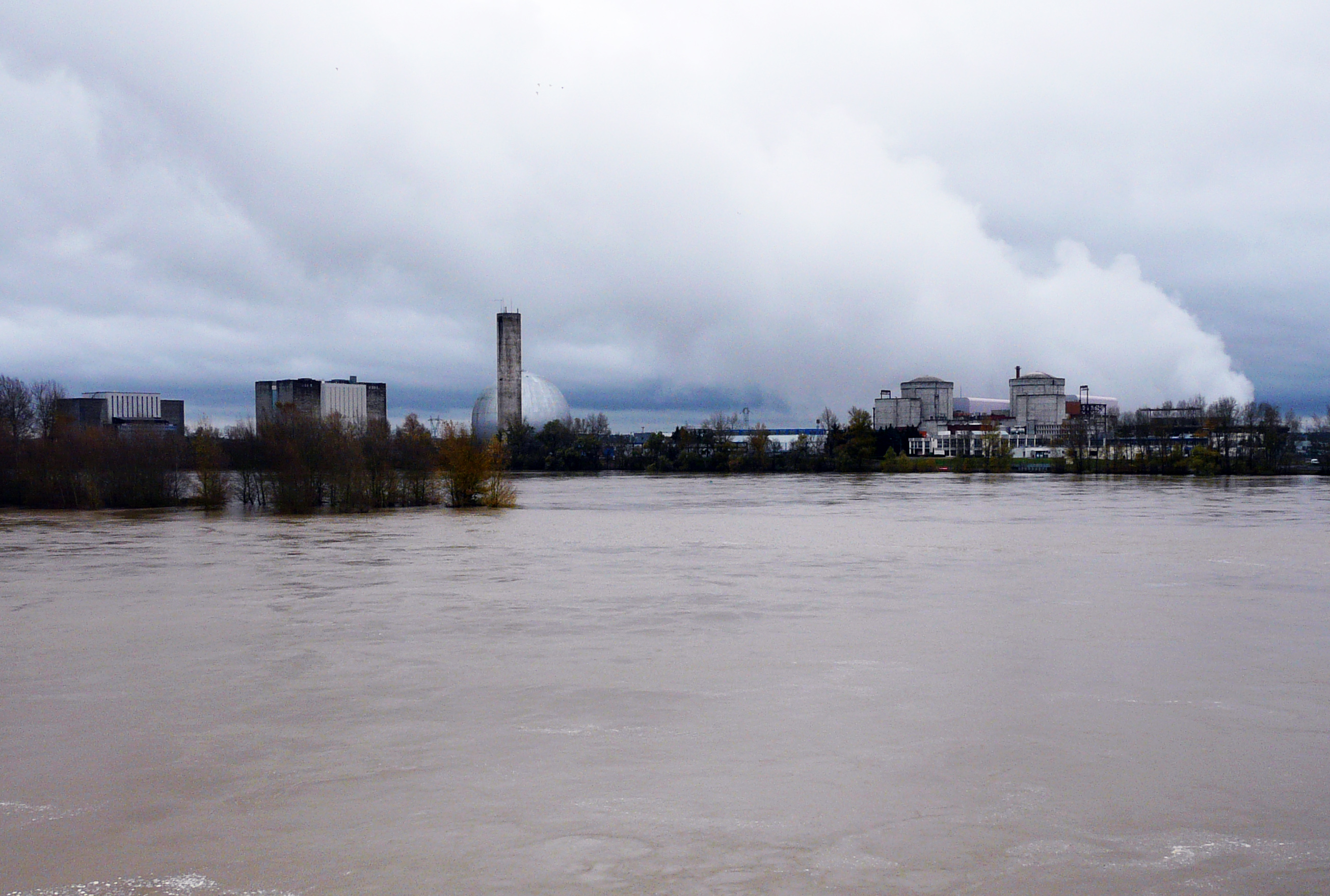
- Official name: Centrale Nucléaire de Chinon
- Country: France
- Location: Avoine, Indre-et-Loire
- Coordinates: 47.2325°N 0.1703°E
- Status: Operational
- Construction began: 1957
- Commission date: 1 February 1964; 62 years ago
- Operator: EDF

Nuclear power station
- Reactor type: PWR
- Reactor supplier: Framatome
- Cooling towers: 4 × Mechanical Draft

Power generation
- Units operational: 4 × 954 MW
- Make and model: Alstom
- Units decommissioned: 1 × 80 MW; 1 × 230 MW; 1 × 480 MW
- Nameplate capacity: 3,816 MW
- Capacity factor: 71.6%
- Annual net output: 23,925 GW·h

External links
- Website: Centrale nucléaire de Chinon
- Commons: Related media on Commons

The Chinon Nuclear Power Plant (French: Centrale nucléaire de Chinon) is near the town of Avoine in the Indre et Loire département, on the river Loire (approximately 10 km from the town of Chinon) in central France. The power station has seven reactors, of which three have been closed.

== Operation ==
It employs approximately 1,350 full-time workers. The operator is Électricité de France (EDF).

== Performance ==
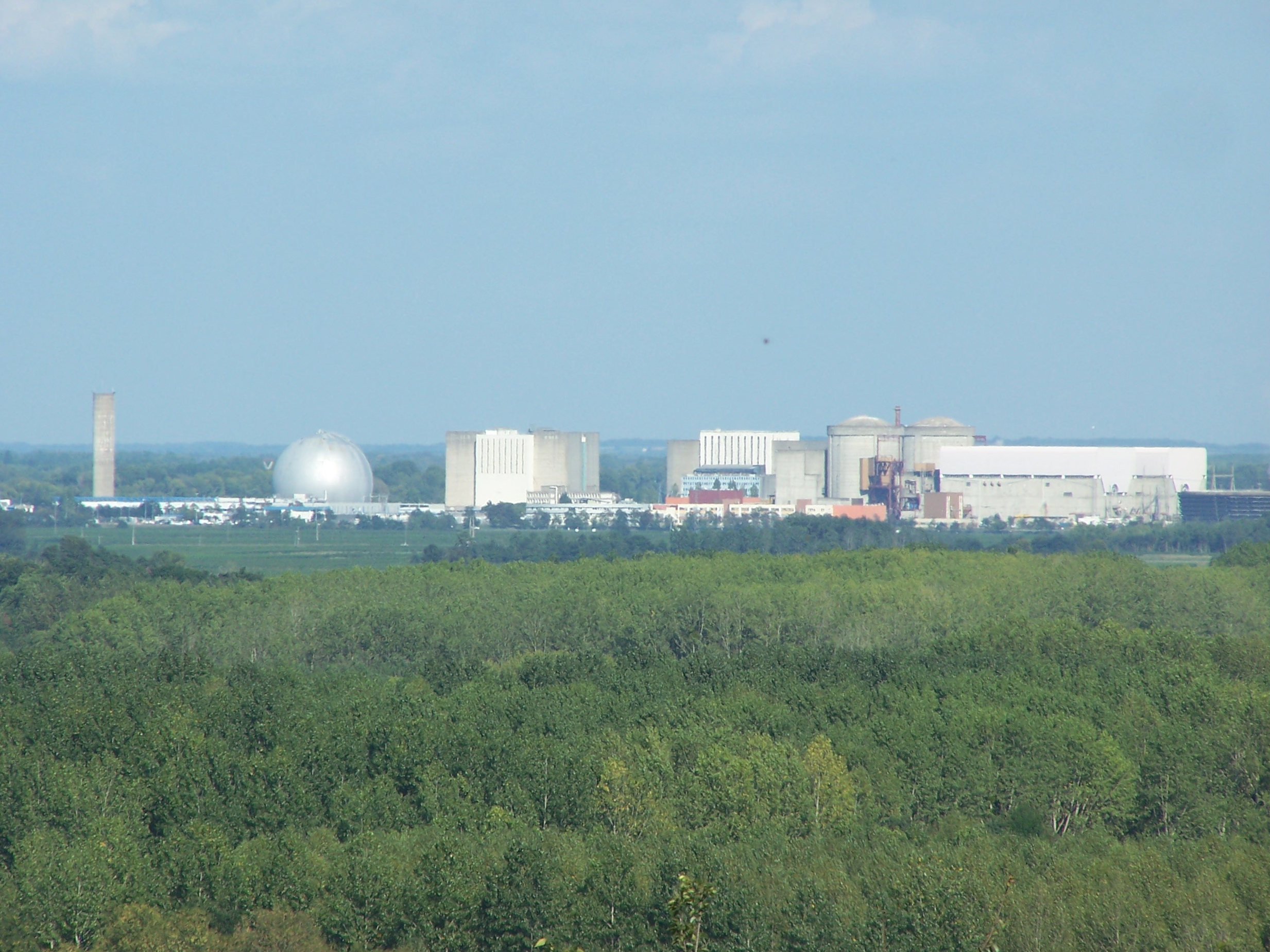
General view of the power plant from Candes-Saint-Martin.

The site houses three of the first generation of French plants, of UNGG-type (similar to the Magnox design), which have now closed. These reactors were named EDF1, EDF2, EDF3 and were later renamed into Chinon-A1, Chinon-A2, Chinon-A3. Four of the first French PWR series were later built on the site (Chinon-B1, Chinon-B2, Chinon-B3, Chinon-B4). The site has four cooling towers, specially designed to be low-profile in order to minimise the visual impact on the Loire.

It is larger than most French plants and feeds approximately 6% of French electricity demand.

== Events ==
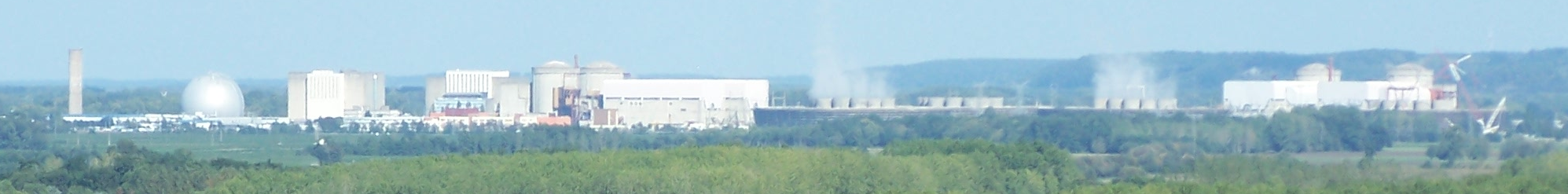
Panoramic view of the Chinon nuclear site.

- During the unusually cold 1986-87 winter, the water intake from the river, as well as several other important pieces of equipment and machinery, froze.
- On 21 December 2005, sand accumulated inside the tertiary cooling circuit, threatening to block it. This could have stopped cooling of all the reactors.
- On 4 September 2008, some industrial oil was accidentally discharged to the river in a maintenance operation. It was not radioactively contaminated.
- On 30 April 2009, a bomb alert caused an evacuation of the plant and an intervention by several units of army security forces.
- On 10 February 2024, France's EDF shut down two nuclear reactors due to a fire at the plant.

== Other info ==
- Since 1986, the closed Chinon A1 reactor has been redeveloped to hold the French Atom Museum.
- The INTRA (INTervention Robotic on Accidents) group, a national nuclear event emergency intervention group equipped with remotely guided, radiation hardened machinery, has its headquarters at the plant.

== Reactors ==
Unit	Type	Net power	Total power	Construction start	Construction finish	Commercial operation	Shut down
Chinon A1	UNGG	70 MW	80 MW	01.02.1957	14.06.1963	01.02.1964	16.04.1973
Chinon A2	UNGG	210 MW	230 MW	01.08.1959	24.02.1965	24.02.1965	14.06.1985
Chinon A3	UNGG	480 MW	480 MW	01.03.1961	04.08.1966	04.08.1966	15.06.1990
Chinon B1	PWR	905 MW	954 MW	01.03.1977	30.11.1982	01.02.1984	Qualified to operate until 2024
Chinon B2	PWR	905 MW	954 MW	01.03.1977	29.11.1983	01.08.1984	Qualified to operate until 2024
Chinon B3	PWR	905 MW	954 MW	01.10.1980	20.10.1986	04.03.1987	Qualified to operate until 2027
Chinon B4	PWR	905 MW	954 MW	01.02.1981	14.11.1987	01.04.1988	Qualified to operate until 2028

== See also ==
- Nuclear decommissioning
