= UNGG reactor =

Type of nuclear reactor

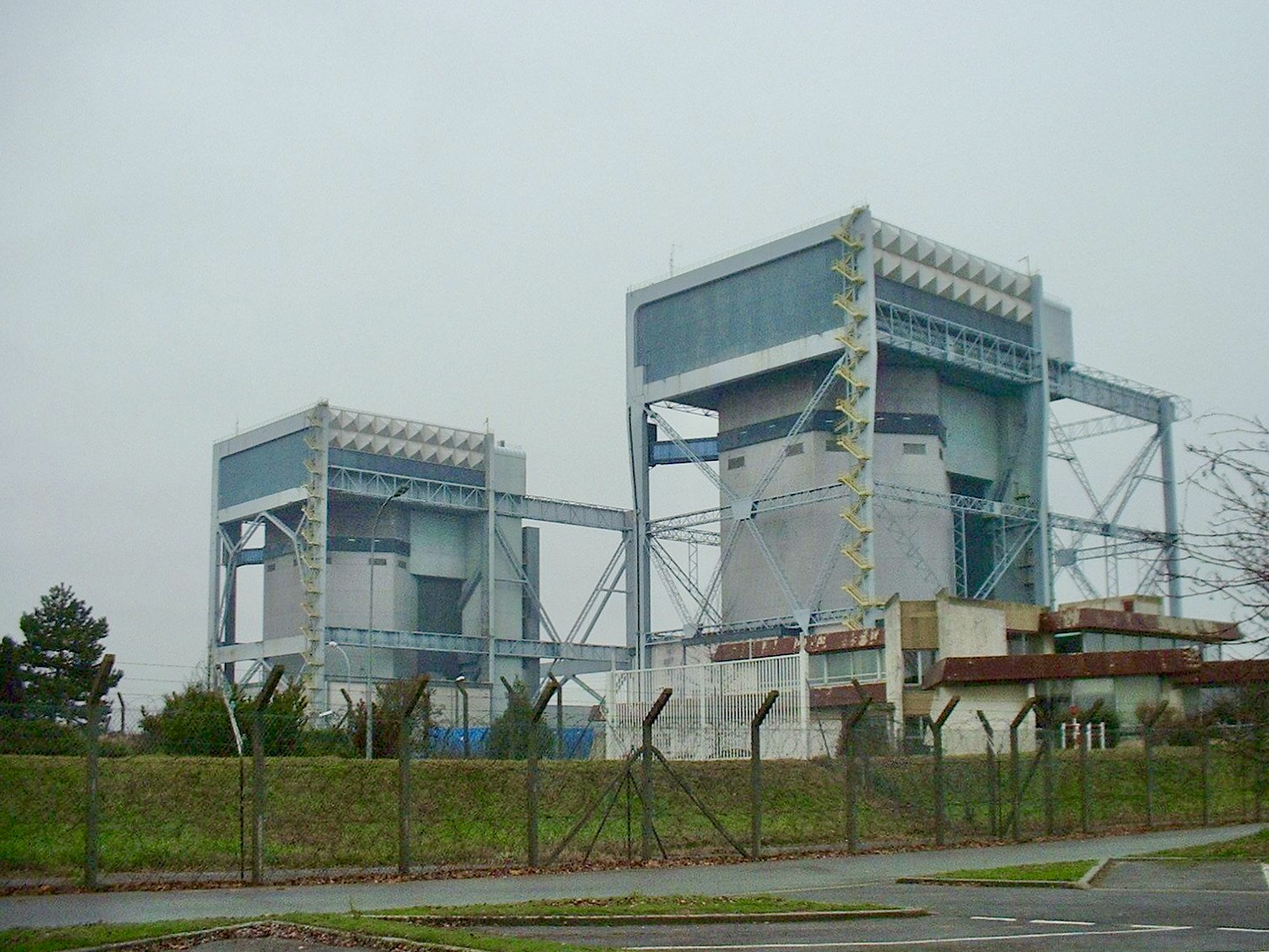
Two UNGG reactors at Saint-Laurent Nuclear Power Plant

The UNGG (Uranium Naturel Graphite Gaz) is an obsolete nuclear power reactor design developed in France. It was graphite moderated, cooled by carbon dioxide, and fueled with natural uranium metal. The first generation of French nuclear power stations were UNGGs, as was Vandellos unit 1 in Spain. Of the ten units built, all were shut down by the end of 1994, most for economic reasons due to staffing costs. A UNGG reactor is often simply referred to as a GCR in English documents.

== Design ==
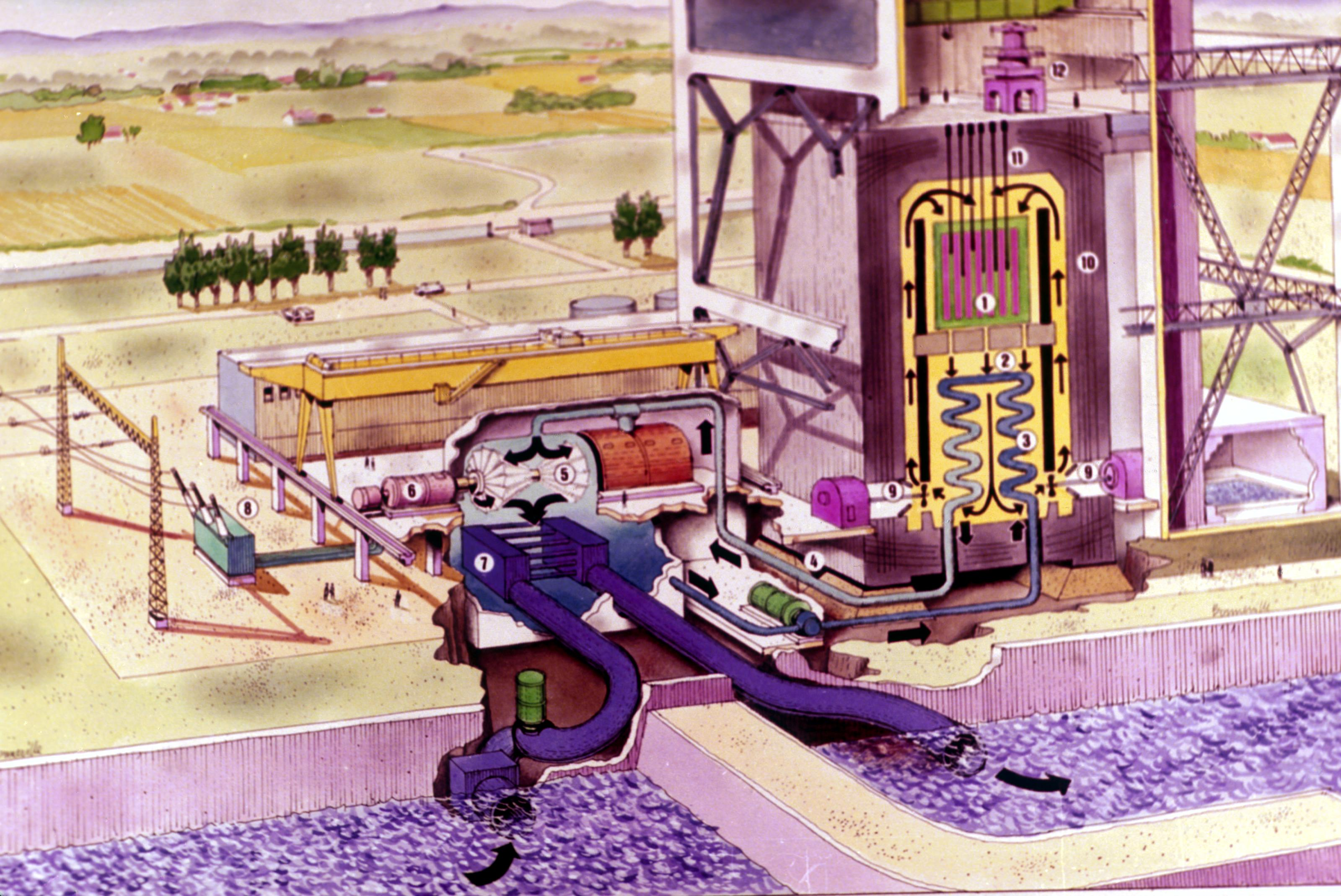
Schematic of a UNGG reactor. It is capable of online refueling.

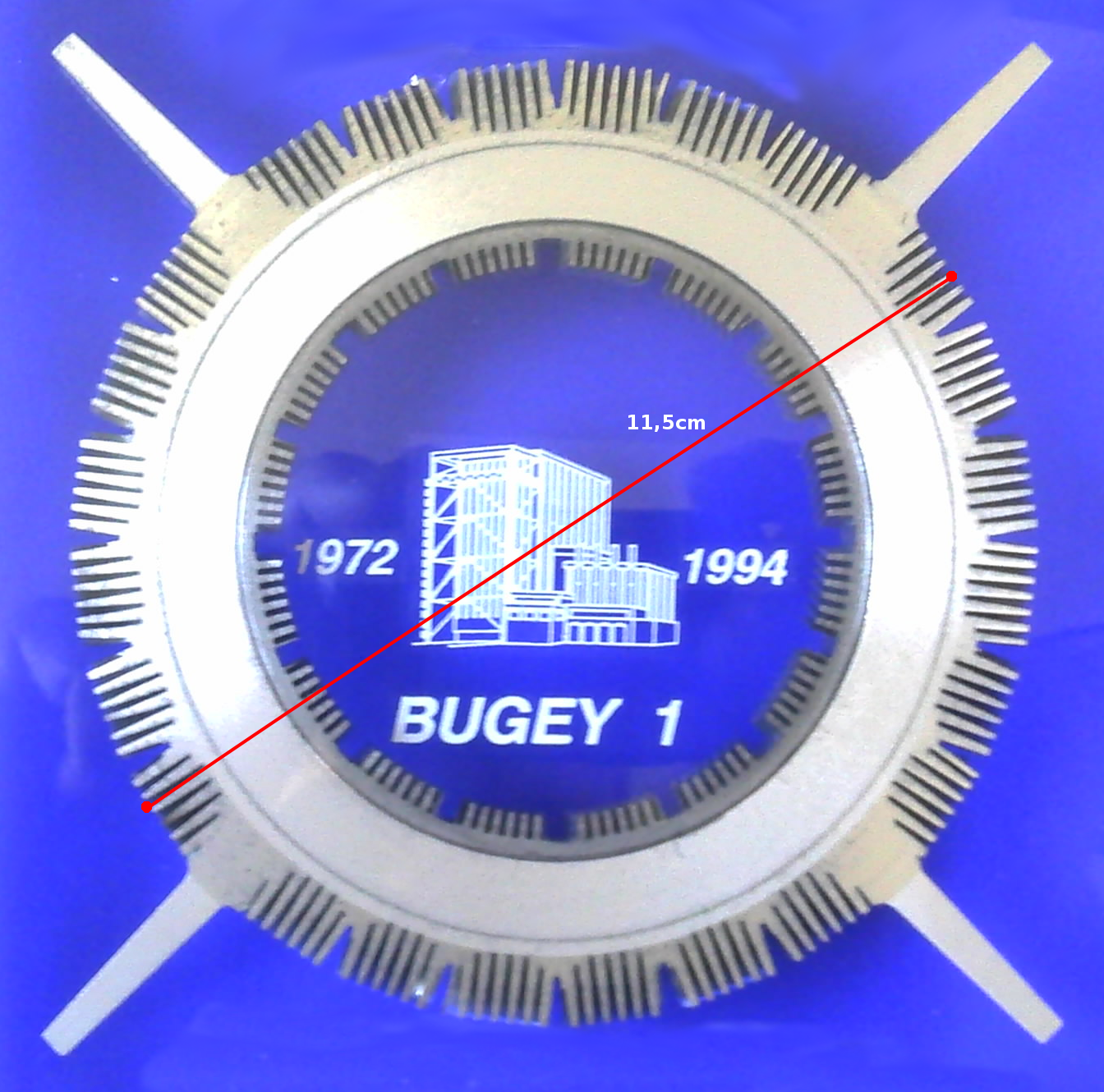
Cross section of UNGG fuel, showing internal cooling path

The UNGG is along with the Magnox the main type of gas cooled reactor (GCR). It was developed independently of and parallel to the British Magnox design, both to meet similar requirements of simultaneous production of electric power and plutonium. Although the French and the British models both used natural uranium and the same moderator and coolant, there were differences in design. In France, each next built reactor had a different design. The first UNGG reactors at Marcoule used horizontal fuel channels and a concrete containment structure. Chinon A1 used vertical fuel channels and a steel pressure-vessel.

The fuel cladding material was a magnesium-zirconium alloy in the UNGG, as opposed to magnesium-aluminium in Magnox. As both claddings react with water, they can be stored in a spent fuel pool only for short periods of time, making short-term reprocessing of fuel essential, which requires heavily shielded facilities.

The programme was a succession of units, with changes to the design increasing power output. In the experimental phase they were built by the Commissariat à l'Énergie Atomique (CEA), and later by Électricité de France (EDF). The largest UNGG reactor built was Bugey 1 with a net electrical output of 540 MW.

== Reactors ==
List of operational, planned, and closed UNGG installations
Power plants			Reactor			Capacity (MW)	Date			Status	Notes	Ref
Unit	Country	Geolocation	Model	Design	Gen	Capacity (MW)	Building	Operational	Closed	Status	Notes	Ref
Marcoule G1	France		UNGG		I	2	1955		1968	Permanent Shutdown	G1 was the first UNGG; a prototype for military use. G1 had a net output of 2 MWe and became critical in 1956.	
Marcoule G2	France		UNGG		I	39	01.03.1955	22.04.1959	02.02.1980	Permanent Shutdown		
Marcoule G3	France		UNGG		I	40	01.03.1956	04.04.1960	20.06.1984	Permanent Shutdown		
Chinon A1	France		UNGG		I	80	01.02.1957	01.02.1964	16.04.1973	Permanent Shutdown		
Chinon A2	France		UNGG		I	230	01.08.1959	24.02.1965	14.06.1985	Permanent Shutdown		
Chinon A3	France		UNGG		I	480	01.03.1961	04.08.1966	15.06.1990	Permanent Shutdown		
Saint-Laurent A1	France		UNGG		I	390		1969	04.1990	Permanent Shutdown		
Saint-Laurent A2	France		UNGG		I	450		1971	06.1992	Permanent Shutdown		
Bugey 1	France		UNGG		I	540	01.12.1965	15.04.1972	27.05.1994	Permanent Shutdown		
Vandellòs 1	Spain		UNGG		I	500			31.07.1990	Permanent Shutdown		

The earlier units, at Chinon and Marcoule, had heat exchangers outside the main pressure vessel; Later units (Saint-Laurent, Bugey and Vandellos) moved these heat exchangers to inside the pressure vessel.

== See also ==
- Nuclear power in France
- Vandellòs I nuclear incident
