= Gas-cooled reactor =

Type of nuclear reactor, CO2 or He cooled

A gas-cooled reactor (GCR) is a nuclear reactor that uses graphite as a neutron moderator and a gas (carbon dioxide or helium in extant designs) as coolant. Although there are many other types of reactor cooled by gas, the terms GCR and to a lesser extent gas cooled reactor are particularly used to refer to this type of reactor.

The GCR was able to use natural uranium as fuel, enabling the countries that developed them to fabricate their own fuel without relying on other countries for supplies of enriched uranium, which was at the time of their development in the 1950s only available from the United States or the Soviet Union. The Canadian CANDU reactor, using heavy water as a moderator, was designed with the same goal of using natural uranium fuel for similar reasons.

== Design considerations ==
Historically thermal spectrum graphite-moderated gas-cooled reactors mostly competed with light water reactors, ultimately losing out to them after having seen some deployment in Britain. Heavy water reactor share some design considerations as both are capable in principle of using unenriched fuel but require online refueling to be viable power reactors.

=== Advantages ===
- No void coefficient of reactivity as the coolant is a gas at room temperature and remains gaseous at operating temperature
- Able to use natural (unenriched) uranium as carbon has a lower neutron absorption cross-section than light water
- High coolant outlet temperature can be achieved, increasing Carnot efficiency
- Lower pressure than in a Pressurized water reactor
- Magnox reactors were designed to be dual use, producing both power and weapons-grade plutonium. Later designs instead produced reactor-grade plutonium
- Lower danger of hydrogen explosion as no water is present
- High coolant outlet temperature allows better use for process heat if desired
- Adding normal (light) water - e.g. as emergency coolant - scrams the reaction allowing better safety in dealing with unforeseen accidents

=== Disadvantages ===
- Bulky due to lower energy density of natural uranium compared to enriched fuel and the lower moderating effect of carbon compared to water
- Magnox fuel cladding cannot be stored for long times in a spent fuel pool making nuclear reprocessing mandatory
- Boudouard reaction between graphite moderator and CO_{2} coolant can produce explosive and poisonous carbon monoxide
- A loss of coolant accident, unlike in a water-moderated reactor, does not by itself cause a scram
- Graphite is flammable and is exposed to high temperatures in operation - a graphite fire is a possible accident scenario
- Nuclear graphite is more expensive than light water but less expensive than heavy water

== Generation I GCR ==
There were two main types of generation I GCR:

- The Magnox reactors developed by the United Kingdom.
- The UNGG reactors developed by France.

The main difference between these two types is in the fuel cladding material. Both types were mainly constructed in their countries of origin, with a few export sales: two Magnox plants to Italy and Japan, and one UNGG to Spain. More recently, GCRs based on the declassified drawings of the early Magnox reactors have been constructed by North Korea at the Yongbyon Nuclear Scientific Research Center.

Both types used fuel cladding materials that were unsuitable for medium term storage under water, making reprocessing an essential part of the nuclear fuel cycle. Both types were, in their countries of origin, also designed and used to produce weapons-grade plutonium, but at the cost of major interruption to their use for power generation despite the provision of online refuelling.

== Generation II GCR ==
In the UK, the Magnox was replaced by the advanced gas-cooled reactor (AGR), an improved Generation II gas cooled reactor. In France, the UNGG was replaced by the pressurized water reactor (PWR).

== Types ==
Gas-cooled reactor types include:

- Gas-cooled reactor (graphite moderated, CO_{2} cooled)
  - Magnox (British design, 28 built, 1956–2015)
  - UNGG reactor (French design, 10 built, 1956–1994)
  - Advanced gas-cooled reactor (Magnox successor, 15 built, since 1962)
- Heavy water gas cooled reactor (heavy water moderated, CO_{2} cooled)
  - Brennilis Nuclear Power Plant (1967–1985)
  - KS 150 (1972–1979)
  - Niederaichbach Nuclear Power Plant (1973–1974)
- High & Very-high temperature reactor (graphite moderated, Helium cooled)
  - Prismatic block reactor
    - Dragon reactor (1964–1975)
    - Peach Bottom Unit 1 (1967–1974)
    - Fort Saint Vrain Generating Station (1979–1989)
    - High-temperature engineering test reactor (since 1999)
    - Gas Turbine Modular Helium Reactor (General Atomics design)
    - Steam Cycle High-Temperature Gas-Cooled Reactor (Areva SMR design)
  - Pebble bed reactor
    - AVR reactor (1966–1988)
    - THTR-300 (1983–1989)
    - HTR-10 (since 2003)
    - HTR-PM (under construction)
    - Pebble bed modular reactor (design)
- Gas-cooled fast reactor (No moderator, Helium cooled)
  - Energy Multiplier Module (General Atomics design)

== See also ==
- UHTREX
