= Assystem =

French engineering company

- Assystem's logo

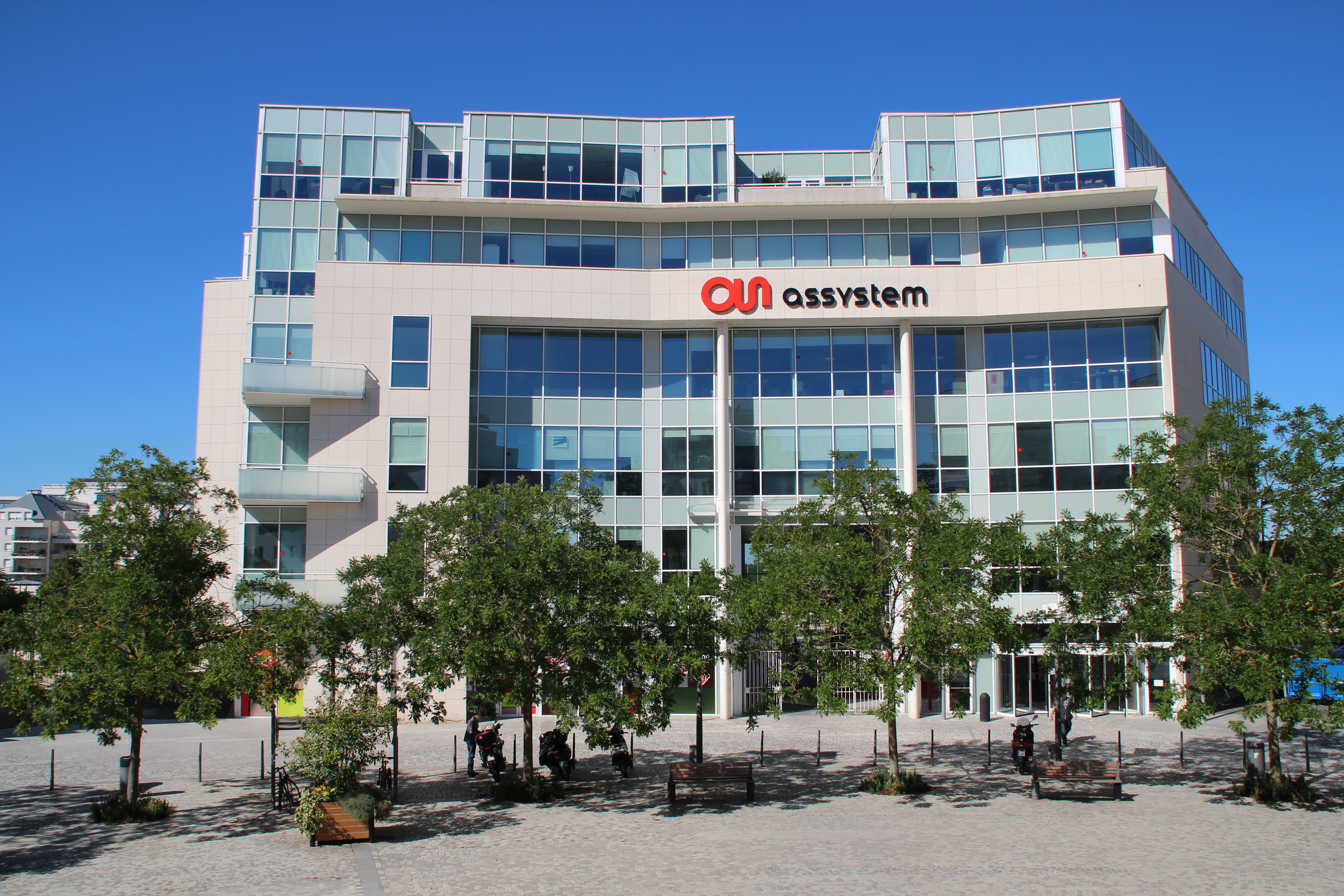
- Assystem at Saint-Quentin-en-Yvelines
- Traded as: CAC Small
- Industry: Engineering & consultancy
- Founded: 1966
- Headquarters: Tour Égée, 9/11 Allée de l'Arche, La Défense 92671 Courbevoie, France
- Key people: Dominique Louis (Chairman)
- Revenue: €471.7 million (2020)
- Number of employees: 7107 (2020)
- Subsidiaries: Assystem France, Assystem Engineering and Operation Services
- Website: www.assystem.com

Assystem is an independent engineering group based in Paris created in 1966. It provides services in design, construction, supervision, commissioning and operation of complex projects and industrial infrastructure, mostly in the nuclear industry. The corporation notably participated to all the EPR (European Pressurized Reactor) construction projects in the world (in Flamanville (France), Taishan (China), and Okiluoto (Finland)).

It had revenues of over €470M in 2020, down from €871.4M in 2013. It had over 7100 employees as of 2021, down from over 11,000 in 2013, mostly due to its decision to recenter its activities around the nuclear industry, and leave behind most of its participation in other sectors (such as the automotive industry).

Assystem also has activities in the aerospace industry. Indeed, in 2005, Assystem acquired the Atena subsidiary of the German company MTU Aero Engines. In addition, the company has also been involved in the engineering of the future Flying Whales airship since 2018.

In February 2019, the division Assystem Technologies was renamed Expleo Group.
