= Framatome =

French nuclear reactor design company

- Framatome's logo since 2018

- Headquarters in La Défense, France
- Formerly: Areva NP
- Industry: Nuclear power
- Founded: 1958; 68 years ago
- Headquarters: La Défense, Courbevoie, France
- Number of locations: 58
- Area served: France, US, China, Germany, United Kingdom
- Key people: Bernard Fontana
- Revenue: ▲€4.67 billion (2024)
- Owner: EDF (80.5%); Mitsubishi Heavy Industries (19.5%)
- Number of employees: 18000+
- Subsidiaries: Framatome Inc.; Framatome GmbH; Framatome Ltd; Edvance; Corys; Intercontrôle; Foxguard Solutions
- Website: www.framatome.com

Framatome (French pronunciation: [fʁamatɔm]) is a French nuclear reactor business. It is owned by Électricité de France (EDF) (80.5%) and Mitsubishi Heavy Industries (19.5%).

The company first formed in 1958 to license Westinghouse's pressurized water reactor (PWR) designs for use in France. Similar agreements had been put in place with other European countries, and this led to a 1962 contract for a complete plant at Chooz. Westinghouse sold its stake to engineering firm Creusot-Loire in 1976, and the company became solely French owned.

In 2001, Siemens sold its reactor business to Framatome. As part of a larger series of mergers with Cogema and Technicatome, Framatome became the Areva NP division of the new Areva. It changed its name back to Framatome in 2018 after a major investment by utility operator EDF.

While originally a licensing and construction business, today Framatome supplies the entire reactor life-cycle, including design of the European Pressurized Reactor (EPR), construction, fuel management and many related tasks.

== History ==
Framatome was founded in 1958 by several companies of the French industrial giant Schneider Group along with Empain, Merlin Gérin, and the American Westinghouse, in order to license Westinghouse's pressurized water reactor (PWR) technology and develop a bid for Chooz A (in France). Called Franco-Américaine de Constructions Atomiques (Framatome), the original company consisted of four engineers, one from each of the parent companies.

The original mission of the company was to act as a nuclear engineering firm and to develop a nuclear power plant that was to be identical to Westinghouse's existing product specifications. The first European plant of Westinghouse design was by then already under construction in Italy. A formal contract was signed in September 1961 for Framatome to deliver a turnkey system, that is, not only the reactor, but an entire, ready-to-use system of piping, cabling, supports, and other auxiliary systems, propelling Framatome from a nuclear engineering firm to an industrial contractor.

In January 1976, Westinghouse agreed to sell its remaining 15% share to Creusot-Loire, which now owned 66%, and to cede complete marketing independence to Framatome. In February, the Belgian Édouard-Jean Empain sold his 35% interest in Creusot-Loire to Paribas, a French government-linked banking group.

A January 1982 company reorganization simultaneously strengthened French public and private control of the company by allowing Creusot-Loire to increase its share of the company while increasing CEA say in the running of the firm. In 2001, German company Siemens' nuclear business was merged into Framatome. Framatome and Siemens had been officially cooperating since 1989 on the development of the European Pressurized Reactor (EPR).

In 2001, after a merger with Cogema (now Orano) and Technicatome, a new nuclear conglomerate called Areva was formed, and Framatome became Areva NP. In 2007, Areva and Mitsubishi Heavy Industries created a joint venture named Atmea, for marketing the ATMEA1 reactor design. In 2009, Areva NP acquired 30% stake in the Mitsubishi Nuclear Fuel company.

In 2009, Siemens sold its remaining shares in Areva NP. In 2018, after restructuring of Areva, Areva NP was sold to Électricité de France. Mitsubishi Heavy Industries (19.5%), and Assystem (5%) also became shareholders (Assystem sold its shares to Électricité de France in 2024). As a result of the restructuring, Électricité de France and Mitsubishi Heavy Industries became equal shareholders of Atmea with 50% of shares both while Framatome owns a special share in Atmea.

== Operations ==
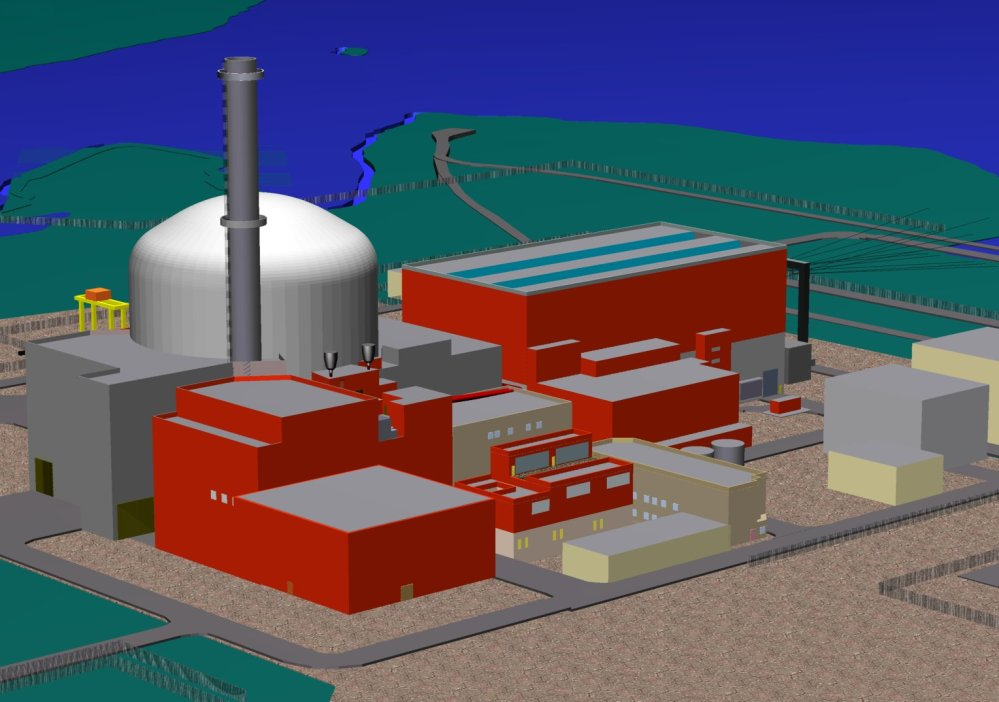
EPR generic layout

Framatome designs, manufactures, and installs components, fuel and instrumentation and control systems for nuclear power plants and offers a full range of reactor services. It is responsible for Flamanville 3 in France, Taishan 1 and 2 in China, Olkiluoto 3 in Finland, and the Hinkley Point C and Sizewell C nuclear power station projects in the United Kingdom, as well as the future EPR2 projects in France. In addition, Framatome conducts preliminary study for construction of six reactors at the Jaitapur Nuclear Power Project in the Indian state of Maharashtra. The company is also involved in design studies for Small modular reactors (SMR) and Advanced Modular Reactors (AMR) and contributes to development programs for Fast-neutron reactors

Framatome has designed and manufactured primary systems components for 107 nuclear reactors worldwide. It has provided EPR reactors, which is a third generation pressurised water reactor (PWR) design, and Kerena reactors, which is 1,250 MWe Generation III+ boiling water reactor (BWR) design, provisionally known as SWR-1000. The Kerena design was developed from that of the Gundremmingen Nuclear Power Plant by Areva, with extensive German input and using operating experience from Generation II BWRs to simplify systems engineering.

Overall, the company has acquired over 65 years of international experience providing various services to more than 380 reactors worldwide.

Comparison between Framatome Reactors
	900 MWe	1300 MWe	1450 MWe	EPR	SWR 1000 (Kerena)
Design	CP0, CP1, CP2	P4, P'4	N4	EPR	
Power					
Net electrical power (MW)	915	1,320	1,450	1,600	1,250
Gross electrical power (MW)	965	1,370	1,530	1,700	1,290
Nominal thermal power	2,785	3,817	4,250	4,324	3,370
Containment enclosure					
Type	simple	double	double	double	
Internal enclosure	Prestressed concrete	Prestressed concrete	Prestressed concrete	Prestressed concrete	
Sealing skin (metal liner)	yes	no	no	yes	
Inner diameter (m)	37	47.8	43.8	48	32
Interior height in the center (m)	55.88	55.56	57.48	48	33.7
Inner Wall thickness (m)	0.9	1.2	1.2	1.3	
External enclosure		Prestressed concrete	Prestressed concrete	Prestressed concrete	
External Wall thickness (m)		0.55	0.55	1.3	
Primary circuit					
Operating pressure (MPa)	15.5	15.5	15.5	15.5	
Water temperature at the tank inlet (°C)	286	292.8	292.2	295.6	
Water temperature at the tank outlet (°C)	323.2	328.7	329.6	330.2	
Number of loops	3	4	4	4	
Volume of the primary circuit (with pressurizer) (m^{3})	271	399	406	460	
Tank					
Inner diameter (mm)	4,003	4,394	4,486	4,885	
Total height (m)	13.2	13.6	13,645	13,105	
Thickness of the wall at core height (mm)	200	220	225	250	
Steam generator	3	4	4	4	
Steam pressure (bar abs)	58	64.8	72.8	77.4	
Temperature (°C)	273	281	288	293	
Steam flow (t/h)	1,820	1,909	2,164	2 197	
Exchange surface (m^{2})	4,746	6,940	7,308	7,960	
Total height (m)	20.6	22.3	21.9	24.2	
Core					
Fuel	UO_{2} (3-5%)	UO_{2} (3-5%)	UO_{2} (3-5%)	UO_{2} (3-5%)	
Active height of rod (mm)	3,660	4,270	4,270	4,200	3,000
Diameter of the pellets (mm)	8.2	8.2	8.2	8.2	
External diameter of rod (mm)	9.5	9.5	9.5	9.5	
Rod sheath	Zircaloy	Zircaloy	Zircaloy	M5	
Number rod per assembly	264	264	264	265	
Number of fuel assembly	157	193	205	241	
Number of control clusters	57	65	73	89	
Primary pump					
Nominal flow rate per pump (m^{3}.h^{-1})	21,250	23,325	24,500	27,195	
Power	5 400	5 910	6 600	8 000	

In 2016, following a discovery at Flamanville 3, about 400 large steel forgings manufactured by Framatome's Le Creusot Forge operation since 1965 were found to have carbon-content irregularities that weakened the steel. A widespread programme of French reactor checks was started involving a progressive programme of reactor shutdowns, continued over the winter high electricity demand period into 2017. In December 2016 the Wall Street Journal characterised the problem as a "decades long coverup of manufacturing problems", with Framatome executives acknowledging that Le Creusot had been falsifying documents. Le Creusot Forge was out of operation from December 2015 to January 2018 while improvements to process controls, the quality management system, organisation and safety culture were made.

In 2026, Framatome's facility in Le Creusot employed more than 680 persons and encompassed 72000 m² of workshops, including a foundry, one forging shop (equipped with two presses rated at 11,300 tonnes and 9,000 tonnes), three machining workshops, one EPR2 reactor internals manufacturing workshop, as well as a testing laboratory. The Le Creusot facility is also a contributor to France's national defense sector. It is the only French manufacturer capable of producing forged blanks for onboard nuclear propulsion steam generators.

In 2020 Framatome won an order to deliver reactor protection systems for the Russian VVER-TOI design nuclear reactors at Kursk II.

== Locations ==
1. France
  - 44 sites spread throughout the country (Framatome and subsidiaries)
  - 7500+ employees
2. Germany
  - 3 locations: Erlangen, Karlstein and Lingen
  - 3000+ employees
3. China
  - 8 sites : Beijing, Lianyungang, Shanghai, Qinshan, Fuqing, Daya Bay, Yangjiang and Taishan
  - 4000 experts in the world providing vital support ACNS
4. USA
  - 9 sites: Benicia, CA, Charlotte, NC, Cranberry Township, PA, Jacksonville, FL, Lynchburg, VA (3 locations), Mansfield, MA, Richland, WA, and Washington, D.C.
  - 2,400 employees
5. Canada
  - 4 sites (Kincardine, ON, Montreal, QC, Pickering, ON and Toronto, ON)
6. UK
  - 6 sites (Avonmouth, Bridgewater, Cranfield, Leiston, Leicester, Manchester)
7. Other countries : Brazil, Bulgaria, Cyprus, Czech Republic, Finland, Hungary, India, Italy, Japan, Slovakia, South Africa, South Korea, Spain, Sweden, Switzerland
