= Flamanville, Manche =

Flamanville
- Commune
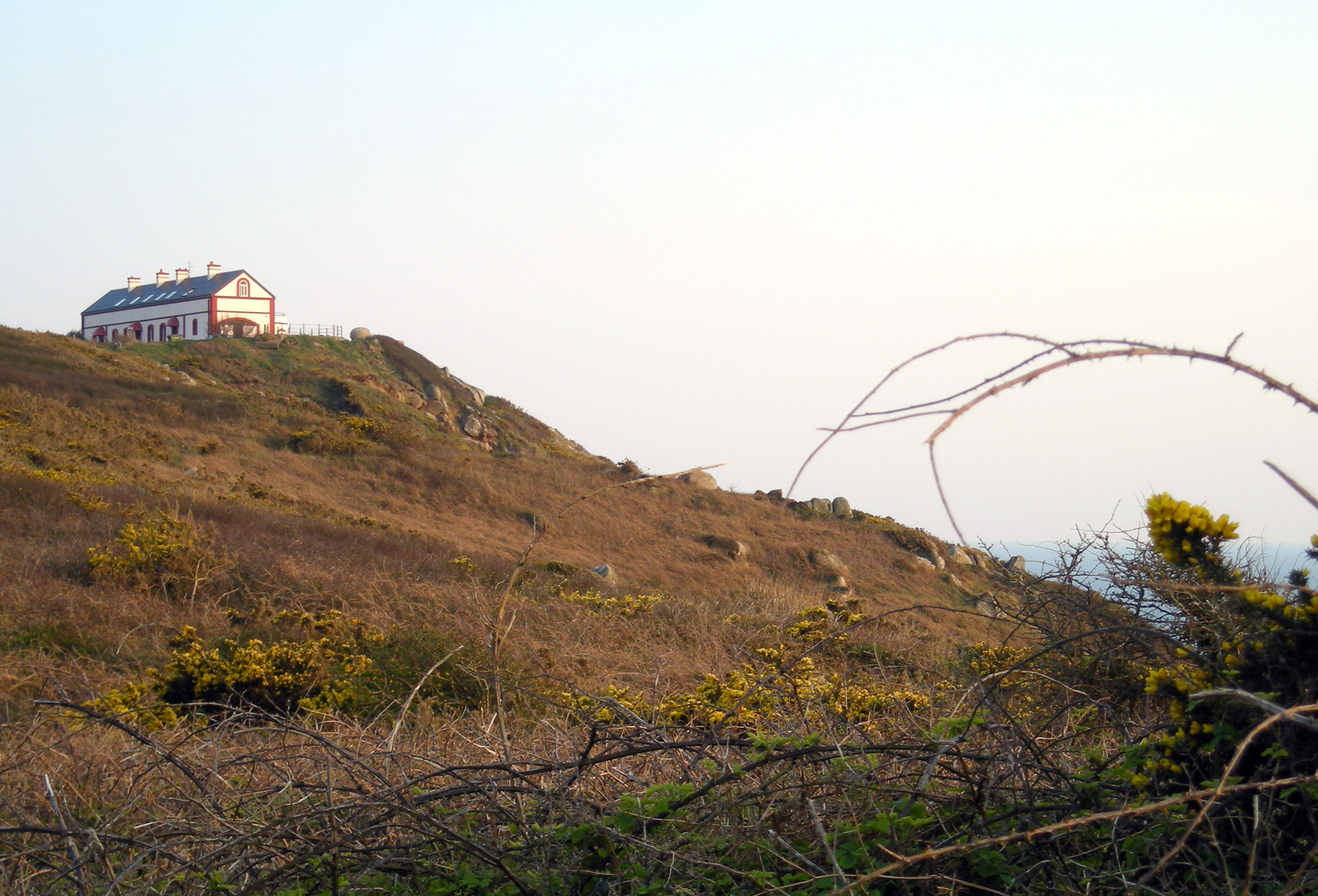
- The signal station

- Coat of arms
- Location of Flamanville
- Location within France Location within Normandy
- Coordinates: 49°31′53″N 1°51′55″W
- Country: France
- Region: Normandy
- Department: Manche
- Arrondissement: Cherbourg
- Canton: Les Pieux
- Intercommunality: CA Cotentin

Government
  - Mayor (2023–2026): Franck Brisset
- Area^{1}: 7.22 km^{2} (2.79 sq mi)
- Elevation: 90 m (300 ft)
- Population (2023): 1,639
  - Density: 227/km^{2} (588/sq mi)
- Time zone: UTC+01:00 (CET)
  - Summer (DST): UTC+02:00 (CEST)
- INSEE/Postal code: 50184 /50340
- ^{1} French Land Register data, which excludes lakes, ponds, glaciers > 1 km^{2} (0.386 sq mi or 247 acres) and river estuaries.

Flamanville (French pronunciation: [flamɑ̃vil]) is a commune in the Manche department in north-western France.

== Port ==
The port of Flamanville, in the northern part of the commune, is known as Diélette. During the summer a high-speed passenger ferry is operated from there to Alderney and Guernsey by Manche Iles Express.

== Heraldry ==
Arms of Flamanville	The arms of Flamanville are blazoned : Per fess 1: Azure, a lion passant and in base 3 barrulets argent; 2: Gules, 3 'maisons' (towers) Or. Upper part Bazan, lower part Sesmaisons.

== Nuclear plants ==
On its territory is installed the seaside Flamanville Nuclear Power Plant, established there in the 1980s, with two PWR reactors of 1300 MWe each, which were put into operation in 1986 and 1987.

A third reactor (an EPR) came into operation in December 2024 after years of delay and cost overruns.

There are also plans for later fourth reactor.

== See also ==
- Communes of the Manche department
