= Areva =

Defunct French nuclear and renewable energy provider

Areva S.A.

- Headquarters in Courbevoie, France
- Type: State-owned enterprise
- Industry: Nuclear industry
- Predecessors: Framatome; Cogema; TechnicAtome
- Founded: 2001
- Defunct: 2018
- Successors: Framatome; Orano; TechnicAtome
- Headquarters: Courbevoie, Paris, France
- Area served: Worldwide
- Key people: Philippe Braidy (chairman and chief executive officer)
- Products: Nuclear reactors Nuclear fuel Uranium; Electric power
- Services: Nuclear enrichment Nuclear material transport Nuclear reprocessing
- Owner: Government of France
- Number of employees: 45,340 (2013)
- Subsidiaries: Areva NP; Areva NC; Areva TA; Areva Mines; Euriware; Areva Med
- Website: www.areva.com

Areva S.A. was a French multinational group specializing in nuclear power, active between 2001 and 2018. It was headquartered in Courbevoie, France. Before its 2016 corporate restructuring, Areva was majority-owned by the French state through the French Alternative Energies and Atomic Energy Commission (54.37%), Banque publique d'investissement (3.32%), and Agence des participations de l'État (28.83%). Électricité de France, in which the French government has a majority ownership stake, owned 2.24%; the Kuwait Investment Authority owned 4.82% as the second largest shareholder after the French state.

As a part of the restructuring program following its insolvency, Areva sold or discontinued its renewable energy businesses and sold its reactors subsidiary Areva NP (which has reverted to its original name, Framatome) to EDF. Its nuclear propulsion and research reactors subsidiary Areva TA (now TechnicAtome) was sold to the Agence des participations de l'État and its nuclear cycle business was reorganized into a separate company New Areva (becoming Orano). A new holding, Areva S.A., was also created to act as a hive-off vehicle for Areva's ongoing “at-risk” activities, including the completion and delivery of the Olkiluoto 3 in Finland, execution of Areva's remaining renewable energy projects, and finalization of the sale of Areva NP to EDF.

In 2017, the sale of Areva TA was finalized and in January 2018, so was that of Areva NP, while New Areva was rebranded Orano; these developments marked the end of the Areva group.

== History ==
=== Creation ===
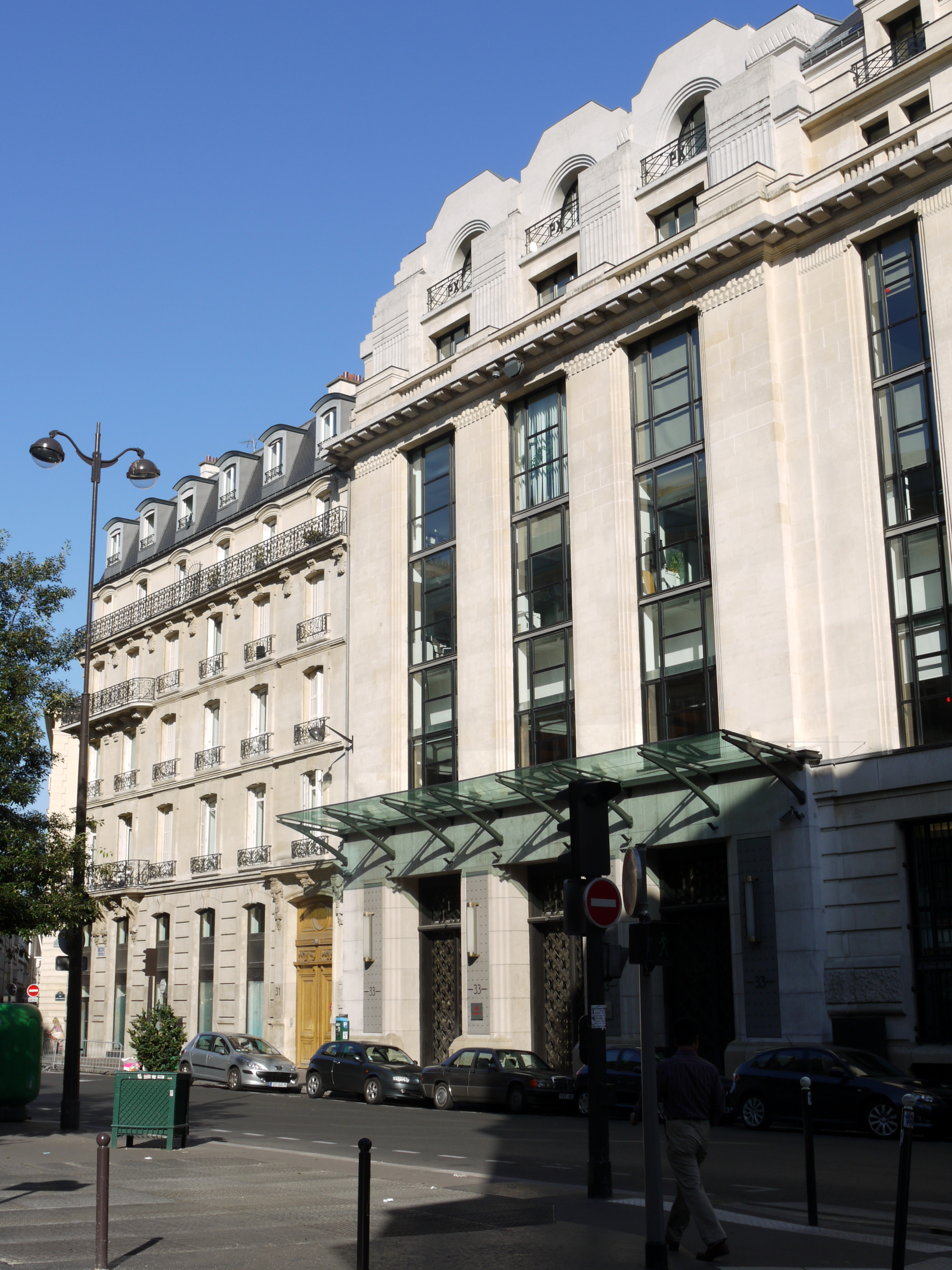
Former Areva headquarters, rue Lafayette in Paris

Areva was created on 3 April 2001 by the merger of Framatome (later: Areva NP, now: Framatome), Cogema (later: Areva NC, now: Orano Cycle) and Technicatome (later: Areva TA, now: Technicatome). It was based on the structure of its precursor, CEA-Industrie. Anne Lauvergeon became its first CEO.

Jean-Pierre Raffarin, the former Prime Minister of France, announced the privatization of Areva in 2003, but it was postponed several times, the French government opting finally for the privatization of GDF and EDF. At the end of October 2005, French Prime Minister Dominique de Villepin announced that he had suspended the privatization process.

In 2003, Areva secured a contract for the Olkiluoto 3 project, which foresaw construction of the third generation EPR-type pressurised water reactor. In 2004 a contracted fixed price was established as €3.2 billion. Construction started in 2005.

In 2004, Areva acquired Alstom's transmission and distribution activities, which became Areva T&D. It was sold back to Alstom and Schneider Electric in June 2010.

On 15 September 2005, Areva and Constellation Energy of Baltimore announced a joint venture called UniStar Nuclear to market the commercial EPR in the United States. The joint venture later became UniStar Nuclear Energy in 2007. In 2010, EDF acquired 100% of UniStar Nuclear Energy. However these plans failed to come to fruition, and in February 2015 Areva suspended the EPR Design Certification Application Review process at the U.S. Nuclear Regulatory Commission (NRC).

In 2006, Areva created its renewable energies business group. Creusot Forge and Creusot Mécanique merged into the Areva group, even though there were quality concerns over Creusot Forge's work. In 2007, Areva purchased 51% of offshore wind turbine manufacturer Multibrid. Multibrid has been a start-up and German offshore wind pioneer, producing wind turbines in Bremerhaven. The innovative M5000 wind turbine has a compact medium speed drive train and carbon rotor blades. The patented air treatment to prevent corrosion was unique. The turbine was designed by aerodyn Energiesysteme GmbH. In 2015 the renewable unit of Areva changed into ADWEN GmbH.

In June 2010, Areva purchased the remaining 49% and formed Areva Wind. In February 2010, Areva bought Ausra, and renamed it Areva Solar.

In 2007, Areva purchased UraMin, which later became Areva Resources Southern Africa (now part of Orano).

In 2007, Areva started construction of the Flamanville 3 EPR reactor. In addition, in November 2007 Areva agreed to an €8 billion deal with the China Guangdong Nuclear Power Group to supply them with two EPRs for Taishan Nuclear Power Plant. Under the terms of the agreement, Areva also had to help operate the plant, including the reprocessing of spent fuel. Also in 2007, Areva and Mitsubishi Heavy Industries created a joint venture named Atmea to develop a 1,100 MWe Atmea-1 pressurised water reactor (Generation III reactor). In 2009, Siemens sold its remaining shares of Areva NP and Arvea NP became wholly owned by Areva. At the same year, Areva NP acquired 30% stake in the Mitsubishi Nuclear Fuel company.

On 6 May 2008, Areva announced that it would seek all necessary approvals to build an enrichment facility in Bonneville County, Idaho. The project was later cancelled. Also in 2008, Areva was awarded an operations contract to clean up the Sellafield nuclear reprocessing site as part of the Nuclear Management Partners consortium, made up of URS, Amec and Areva.

In June 2008, Areva reached an agreement with Kazatomprom to create a joint-venture Katco.

On 4 February 2009, Areva signed a memorandum to supply two to six nuclear reactors to the Nuclear Power Corporation of India Limited for the Jaitapur Nuclear Power Project in the Indian state of Maharashtra.

In March 2010, Areva indicated work was being done on a new type of burner reactor type capable of breaking down actinides created as a product of nuclear fission.

In 2011, Areva was listed on the Euronext stock exchange in Paris.

=== Post-Fukushima problems ===
In December 2011, Areva suspended building work at several sites in France, Africa and the United States, one day after forecasting a €1.6 billion ($2.1 billion) loss.

Areva halted "capacity extensions" at its La Hague Reprocessing Plant, in northern France, at its Melox factory in the southwest, and at two sites attached to its Tricastin power plant in the south. Work has also stopped on extensions to uranium mines in Bakouma in the Central African Republic, Trekkopje in Namibia, and Ryst Kuil in South Africa, and caused a potential delay in construction until a capital solution is secured for the Eagle Rock Enrichment Facility in the United States. Areva wrote off most of the $2.5 billion purchase cost of Canadian uranium mining company Uramin, purchased in 2007, after concluding that its uranium ore deposits were of negligible value.

In September 2014 Standard & Poor's stated it might downgrade Areva's credit rating following weak first-half results, leading to Areva indicating it would cut capital spending and dispose of some assets. In March 2015 Standard & Poor's further downgraded Areva's credit rating to BB− after Areva posted a €4.8 billion loss for 2014.

In 2012, Areva acquired the hydrogen technology developer Compagnie européenne des technologies de l'hydrogène (CETH) and renamed it Areva H2Gen. In the same year, it inaugurated a hydrogen storage system called the MYRTE platform near Ajaccio, Corsica (MYRTE is the French acronym for Mission Hydrogène Renouvelable pour l’intégration au réseau électrique). The system aims to establish the feasibility of a storage solution for solar energy using hydrogen technologies, which would serve as a back-up system to stabilize Corsica's power grid. In 2014, Areva's energy storage and management system, the Greenergy Box, was added to the existing installation, in operation since early 2013. In January 2014, Areva and Spain's wind turbine manufacturer Gamesa Corporación Tecnológica created on the basis of Areva Wind a joint venture Adwen. In August 2014, Areva exited the solar industry.

In October 2013, Areva won a $2.7 billion contract to supply two EPR nuclear reactors with nuclear steam supply and control systems at the Hinkley Point C plant in Somerset, England. It will also provide uranium extraction and enrichment for the fuel fabrication stage.

In December 2013, Areva and China General Nuclear Power (CGN) agreed to a partnership in renewable energy, with a focus on offshore wind, biomass, concentrated solar power, and energy storage.

In October 2014, CEO Luc Oursel took a leave of absence for health reasons. He died in December of the same year. On 20 November 2014 Standard & Poor's downgraded Areva long-term debt to BB+ and short-term-debt to A-3.

In May 2014, Areva, through its subsidiary CETH2, and the ADEME (French Environment and Energy Management Agency), announced the creation of the AREVA H2-Gen joint venture.

In December 2015 operations at Le Creusot Forge were stopped following a discovery at the Flamanville Nuclear Power Plant. About 400 large steel forgings manufactured by Le Creusot Forge since 1965 found to have carbon-content irregularities that weakened the steel. A widespread programme of reactor checks was started involving a progressive programme of reactor shutdowns. This caused power price increases in Europe as France increased electricity imports, especially from Germany, to augment supply. In December 2016 international inspectors found evidence of recent doctored paperwork, which had not been detected by Areva's independent quality control checks. In April 2017 Autorité de sûreté nucléaire (ASN) published the requirements for forging to resume at Le Creusot Forge. In August 2017 ASN published a draft decision requiring the examination of Le Creusot Forge manufacturing records of all components during scheduled reactor refuelling outages.

=== Restructuring ===
In June 2016 Areva's restructuring plans were made public, including the sale of the majority of its reactor business to EDF in 2017, excluding the Olkiluoto 3 EPR under construction in Finland which will remain with Areva SA. In December 2017, Areva and EDF signed agreements on the transfer of Areva NP's nuclear reactor operations. As part of the restructuring plan, Areva created a new fuel cycle company, dubbed as New Co or New Areva. The new company combined Areva Mines, Areva NC, Areva Projects, and Areva Business Support companies. It was created as a wholly owned subsidiary of Areva; however, Areva lost control over the company as the French government invested to recapitalize the company. On 23 January 2018 that company changed its name to Orano. In January 2017, Areva sold its stake in the wind turbine manufacturer Adwen. In March 2017, Areva sold its nuclear propulsion and research reactor subsidiary Areva TA to Agence des Participations de l'Etat.

== Current operations ==
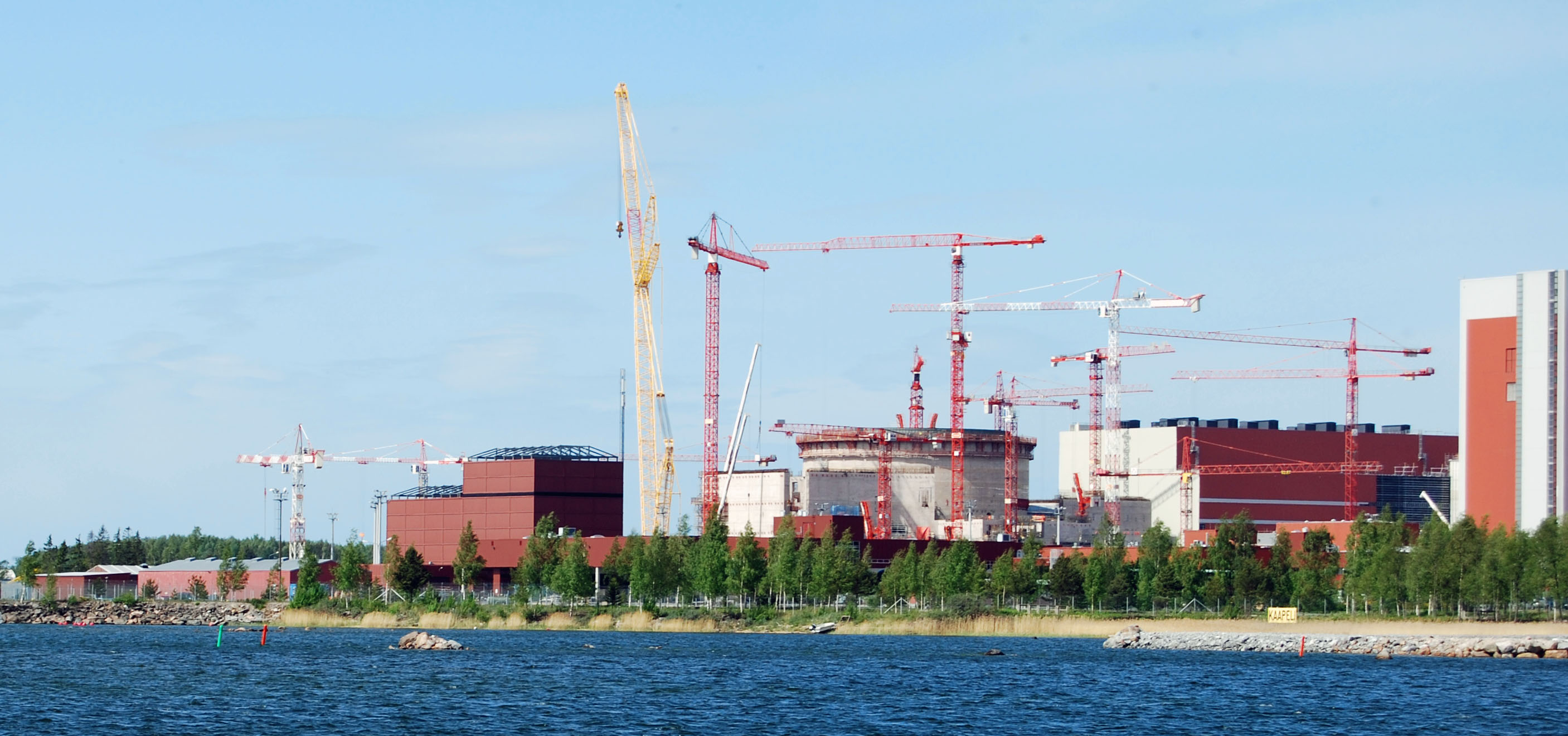
Olkiluoto-3 under construction in 2009

As of 2019, Areva S.A. is responsible only for the liabilities related to the Olkiluoto 3 project. The reactor, which is one of the first of the new Generation III reactors, was initially expected to begin producing electricity in 2009, but project completion was delayed eventually until 2023, and it has faced several price increases. Areva and TVO have reached an agreement, according to which Areva would pay €450 million in compensation over the delays and lost income. The agreement would settle all legal actions between the two companies.

Areva also holds of 40% stake in Orano.

== Past operations ==
Areva was a company with a presence in each industrial activity linked to nuclear energy: mining, chemistry, enrichment, fuel assembly, reprocessing, engineering, nuclear propulsion and reactors, treatment, recycling, stabilization and dismantling. Areva also offered technological solutions for renewable energy. Areva's activities were divided into five business groups.

=== Nuclear operations ===
The mining business group managed the exploration of uranium ore, its extraction, and processing, as well as the restoration of sites after mine closure. It had staff on five continents and operated uranium production sites in Canada, Kazakhstan, and Niger. As of the end of 2013, the Mining Business Group employed 4,463 people. Uranium production accounted for 19% of Areva's consolidated revenue in 2013. It is now part of Orano.

The front end business group provided access to fuel for Areva's customers, and oversees operations to convert uranium into nuclear fuel, including the chemical conversion of ore into uranium hexafluoride, the enrichment of uranium, and the design and production of fuel for nuclear reactors. As of the end of 2013, 8,555 people worked for Areva's front end business group. It accounted for 24% of Areva's consolidated revenue in 2013. It is now part of Orano.

The reactors and services business group designed and built pressurized water reactors and boiling water reactors, and offers products to service nuclear reactors. It is now part of Framatome. The business group also designed and built naval propulsion and research reactors, which is now Technicatome. The business group had 15,592 employees at the end of 2013 and generated 36% of Areva's revenue in the same year.

The back end business group developed recycling solutions for used fuel for reuse in reactors. It also offered storage and transportation solutions for radioactive material, and site rehabilitation at nuclear facilities. It is now part of Orano. At the end of 2013, it had 11,583 employees and made up for 19% of Areva's revenue. In 2017 the NUHOMS Matrix advanced used nuclear fuel storage overpack, a high-density system for storing multiple spent fuel rods in canisters, was launched.

=== Renewable energy operations ===
Areva created its global renewable energies business group in 2006. This group represented four business lines: concentrated solar power, offshore wind power, biomass power, and hydrogen power storage and distribution. Areva built biomass power plants worldwide, representing 2.5 GWe of installed capacity. These plants are located in Brazil, Chile, Germany, the Netherlands, India and Thailand. Its subsidiary Areva Renewables Brazil built biomass power plants based on bagasse (organic waste from sugar cane). In the United States, Areva formed a partnership with Duke Energy to build and operate 55 MW biomass power plants based on wood waste.

Areva acquired a bio-coal production technology called Thermya, which produces a biofuel issued from biomass torrefaction that can replace coal to generate thermal energy and electricity. Areva also developed AdCub, a modular concept for compact power plants targeting small-scale biomass resources that addresses relatively untapped growth opportunities in Europe. The objective is to combine innovative solutions which optimize customer costs for small-scale power plants (between 3 and 6 MW) and reduce construction time. This new biomass plant concept also aims to improve upstream technologies for multi-fuel acceptance and higher availability.

Areva designed, manufactured and industrialized turnkey energy storage solutions and products to generate electricity with fuel cells and produce hydrogen by electrolysis. Areva supported research in the hydrogen field through partnerships with a number of industrial companies and national research organizations including Agence Nationale de la Recherche, the Horizon Hydrogen Energy (H2E) program, PAN-H (Plan d'Action National sur l'Hydrogène et les piles à combustible) and Pôle Capenergies, an innovation cluster dedicated to the development of renewable forms of energy without greenhouse gas emissions.

=== Other operations ===
Areva was involved in military technology, such as designing the nuclear reactor for the French Barracuda class submarine. One of Areva's subsidiaries, Euriware (founded in 1991) was specialized in consulting and IT services and employs 2,200 people. Areva also owned 1.99% of Safran and 1.4% of Suez Environnement.

CERCA, a subsidiary of Areva that produces fuel for research reactors, was also involved in TRIGA, a research reactor established in 1996 with the US firm General Atomics that is used for training, research, and the production of radioisotopes.

Areva was a former corporate member of the Bruegel think tank.

== Notable incidents ==
=== 2007 fine ===
In January 2007, Areva was fined €53 million by the European Commission for rigging EU electricity markets through a cartel involving 11 companies, including ABB, Alstom, Fuji, Hitachi, AE Power Systems, Mitsubishi Electric, Schneider Electric, Siemens, Toshiba and VA Tech Wabag. According to the commission, "between 1988 and 2004, the companies rigged bids for procurement contracts, fixed prices, allocated projects to each other, shared markets and exchanged commercially important and confidential information."

Areva is not accused of any cartel involvement other than through the acquisition of an Alstom unit in January 2004. "This subsidiary was acquired by the Areva group towards the end of the infringement, in January 2004. The parent entities of the Areva group share a joint liability with that subsidiary for the period after its acquisition." "A few months before the cartel ended, Alstom sold the unit involved to Areva, which knew nothing of the cartel. It [Areva] and Alstom have joint liability for 53.6 million, which they must decide how to split."

EU Competition Commissioner Neelie Kroes declared that "The commission has put an end to a cartel which has cheated public utility companies and consumers for more than 16 years".

=== Libya deal ===
On 13 August 2007, the French newspaper Le Parisien alleged that the Franco-Libyan civil nuclear power agreement signed by President Nicolas Sarkozy did not concern desalinization of sea water, as claimed by the French government, but instead focused in particular on selling the EPR to Libya, a contract potentially worth $3 billion. Le Parisien cited Philippe Delaune, deputy to the deputy director of international affairs for the CEA atomic agency, which is the main share-holder in Areva. Following allegations that the deal had been related to the release of the Bulgarian nurses, the French Socialist Party, through the spokesperson Jean-Louis Bianco, declared that this deal was "geopolitically irresponsible". The German government also denounced the agreement.

=== Bakouma assault ===
On 24 June 2012, an armed group assaulted a uranium plant operated by Areva at Bakouma in the southeast of the Central African Republic. A statement by the military described that "a violent clash on Sunday afternoon pitted" Central African troops against "an unidentified group of armed men attempting to launch an assault on the site of mining company Areva".

According to the report the army successfully repelled the attack, but "the enemy did some material damage and pulled back while taking a sizeable quantity mainly of food with them." The Areva group issued no immediate statement regarding the attack. Central African military sources believe that the attack was organized by members of the Chadian rebel group Popular Front for Recovery (FPR) led by 'General' Baba Ladde, which has been active in the region since 2008. The army says it is conducting further operations to neutralize the remaining armed rebels in the region of Bakouma.

=== Attack in Niger ===
In May 2013, the company's uranium mine in Niger was damaged and one civilian was killed in an Al-Qaeda-linked suicide bomb attack. The mine reached full production again in August 2013.

=== Tuareg people ===
In November 2009, Greenpeace released a report indicating that two villages near Areva's mining operations in Niger had dangerously high levels of radiation.

In January 2014, Al Jazeera produced Orphans of the Sahara, three-part series on the Tuareg people of the Sahara desert, in which claims were brought to light that Areva mining and consequent irradiations are causing diseases and deaths among their people.

Al Jazeera also published Areva's response, in which the company said it submits regular reports on its environmental monitoring of water, air and soil to the Nigerien Office of Environmental Assessments and Impact Studies (BEEEI) which indicate that there is no pollution around the sites in question.

== Corporate issues ==
=== Sport sponsorship ===
Areva sponsored several sporting events over the years. In 2009, Areva launched Athlenergy.com, an online resource for runners, and became the sponsor of the French Athletics Federation and the official sponsor of Meeting Areva, a track and field competition held annually at the Stade de France in Saint-Denis, France. In May 2014, Athlenergy.com became Arevarun. Areva also sponsors several running events, including the Paris Half Marathon and Saintélyon, a night run from Sainte Etienne to Lyon, in France.

In 2008, Areva signed a contract to sponsor the German football club FC Nürnberg until 2012. The contract was completed in 2012.

Areva sponsored the French "Defi Areva" team in the 2002 America's Cup race, and the French "Areva Challenge" team in the 2007 America's Cup race. In 2002, during its first public appearance, in Lorient, France, the "Defi Areva" yacht collided with a dinghy carrying four Greenpeace protesters, and the impact knocked a hole in the side of the 80-foot boat.

== See also ==
- Calvert Cliffs Nuclear Power Plant
- European Atomic Energy Community
- Groupe INTRA
- Kazatomprom
- Nine Mile Point Nuclear Generating Station
- Nuclear Power 2010 Program
- World Nuclear Industry Status Report
- UraMin
