= Orphans of the Sahara =

- Genre: Documentary series
- Created by: Al Jazeera Media Network
- Written by: May Ying Welsh
- Directed by: May Ying Welsh
- Countries of origin: Qatar; Mali; Niger; Algeria; Libya
- Original language: English

Production
- Producer: Al Jazeera Media Network
- Running time: cca 50 minutes

Original release
- Release: January 9 – January 23, 2014

Orphans of the Sahara is a three-part documentary series produced by Al Jazeera and aired in January 2014. The series follows the story of the Tuareg people of the Sahara desert, from their involvement in war in Libya, fighting for Muammar Gaddafi, to their return home to crushing poverty in Mali and Niger, then as they launched the Tuareg Rebellion of 2012 for an independent country in the Sahara, Azawad. As the Northern Mali conflict escalated, their dreams were crushed once again, first by al-Qaeda, then by French military intervention in Mali and Niger, with the help of military coalitions established by European Union nations and US.

== Synopsis ==
The documentary was divided into 3 parts. The 1st part ("Return") was about the Tuareg who left Libya after the death of Muammar Gaddafi in the Libyan Civil War, fleeing to the Nigerien city of Agadez. Another part was about Tuaregs struggling to survive the Sahara. Another was about the beginning of another Tuareg rebellion in Mali, this time led by the National Movement for the Liberation of Azawad (MNLA).

The 2nd part ("Rebellion") was centered on them and their stiff competition with the Islamists, namely Al-Qaeda's AQIM, Ansar Dine, and MOJWA/MUJAO, and also focused on further story of the Tuaregs struggling to survive in the Sahara.

The 3rd and final part ("Exile") covered both the downfall of AL-Qaeda and the Islamists, the effect of Areva's mining operations in Niger, the future of Azawad, and the struggle for Azawad and Tuareg homeland freedom.

== Areva controversy and company reaction ==
The show brought to light problems caused by French corporation Areva's mining operations on the Tuareg lands in Niger and claims that company's uranium mining and consequent radiations causing diseases and extremely high death rate among Tuareg people, especially among children and elderly.

Soon enough, Areva issued a response, and Al Jazeera published it on its website, in which the company claims it submits regular reports on its environmental monitoring of water, air, and soil to the Nigerien Office of Environmental Assessments and Impact Studies (BEEEI), which allegedly indicate that there is no pollution around the sites in question.
