= Gravelines Nuclear Power Station =

Nuclear power plant in France

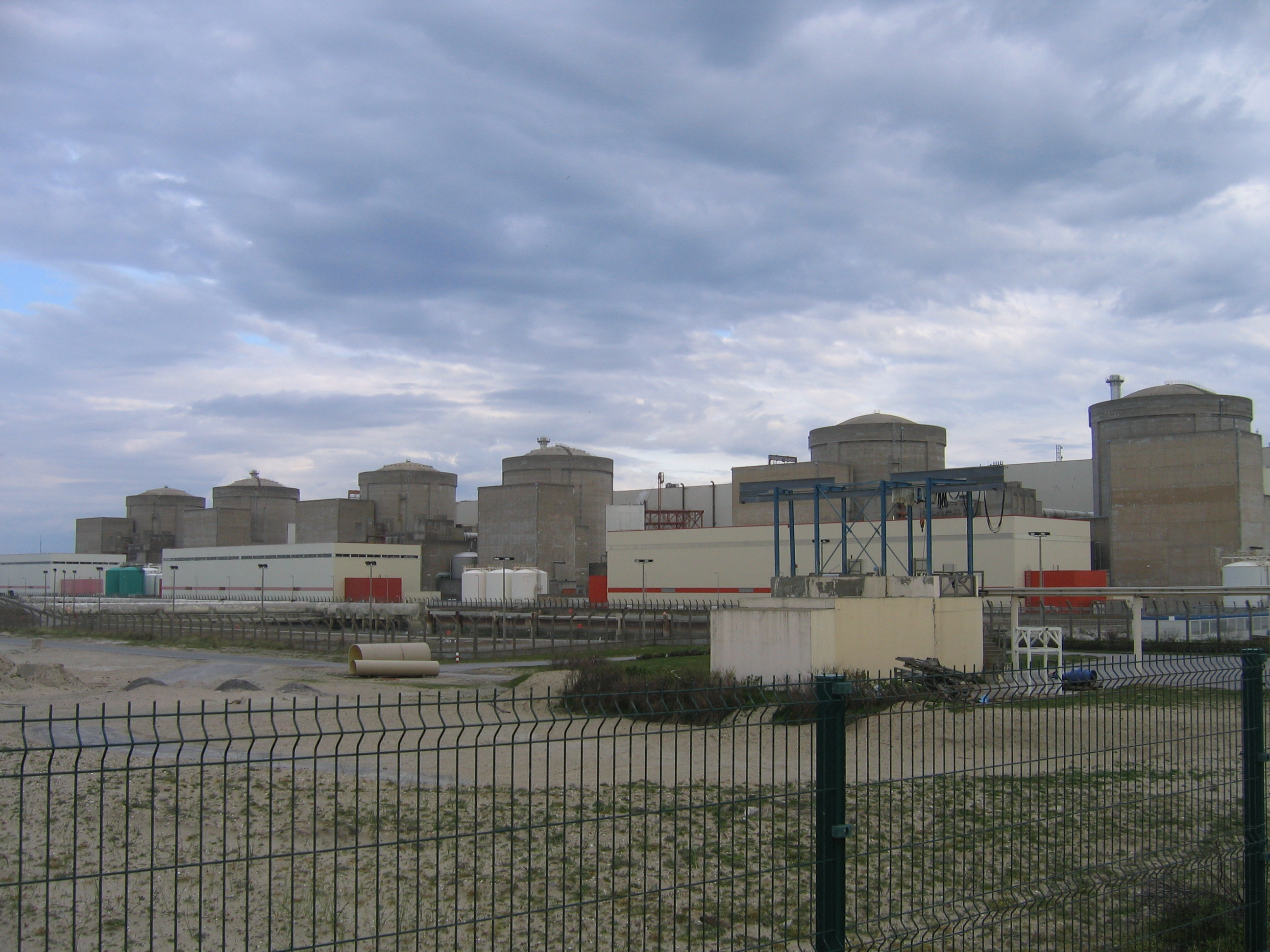
- Gravelines Nuclear Power Station
- Official name: Centrale Nucléaire de Gravelines
- Country: France
- Location: Gravelines, Nord
- Coordinates: 51°00′55″N 02°08′10″E
- Status: Operational
- Construction began: 1975
- Commission date: 25 November 1980
- Operator: EDF

Nuclear power station
- Reactor type: PWR
- Reactor supplier: Framatome

Power generation
- Units operational: 6 × 910 MW
- Make and model: Alstom
- Nameplate capacity: 5460 MW
- Capacity factor: 76.9%
- Annual net output: 38,462 GW·h

External links
- Website: EDF.com
- Commons: Related media on Commons

The Gravelines Nuclear Power Station is a nuclear power plant located in the commune of Gravelines in Nord, France, approximately 20 km (12 mi) from Dunkerque and Calais. Its cooling water comes from the North Sea. The plant consists of 6 nuclear reactors with a nameplate capacity of 900 MW each. In 2017 the plant produced 31.67 TWh of electric energy, 5.9% of French electricity production. Of the plant's six reactors, two entered service in 1980, two in 1981, and two in 1985.

The site employs 1,680 regular employees. As of 2 August 2010, it became the second nuclear power station anywhere in the world to produce over one thousand terawatt-hours of electricity, following Bruce Nuclear Generating Station in Ontario, Canada, which had reached that milestone in 2009.

The reactors of Units 5 and 6 were initially intended for export to Iran, but the order was cancelled after the Iranian Revolution in 1979. Their design, known as CPY, was the basis for the Chinese CPR-1000. An intermediate derivative of the reactor is called the M310.

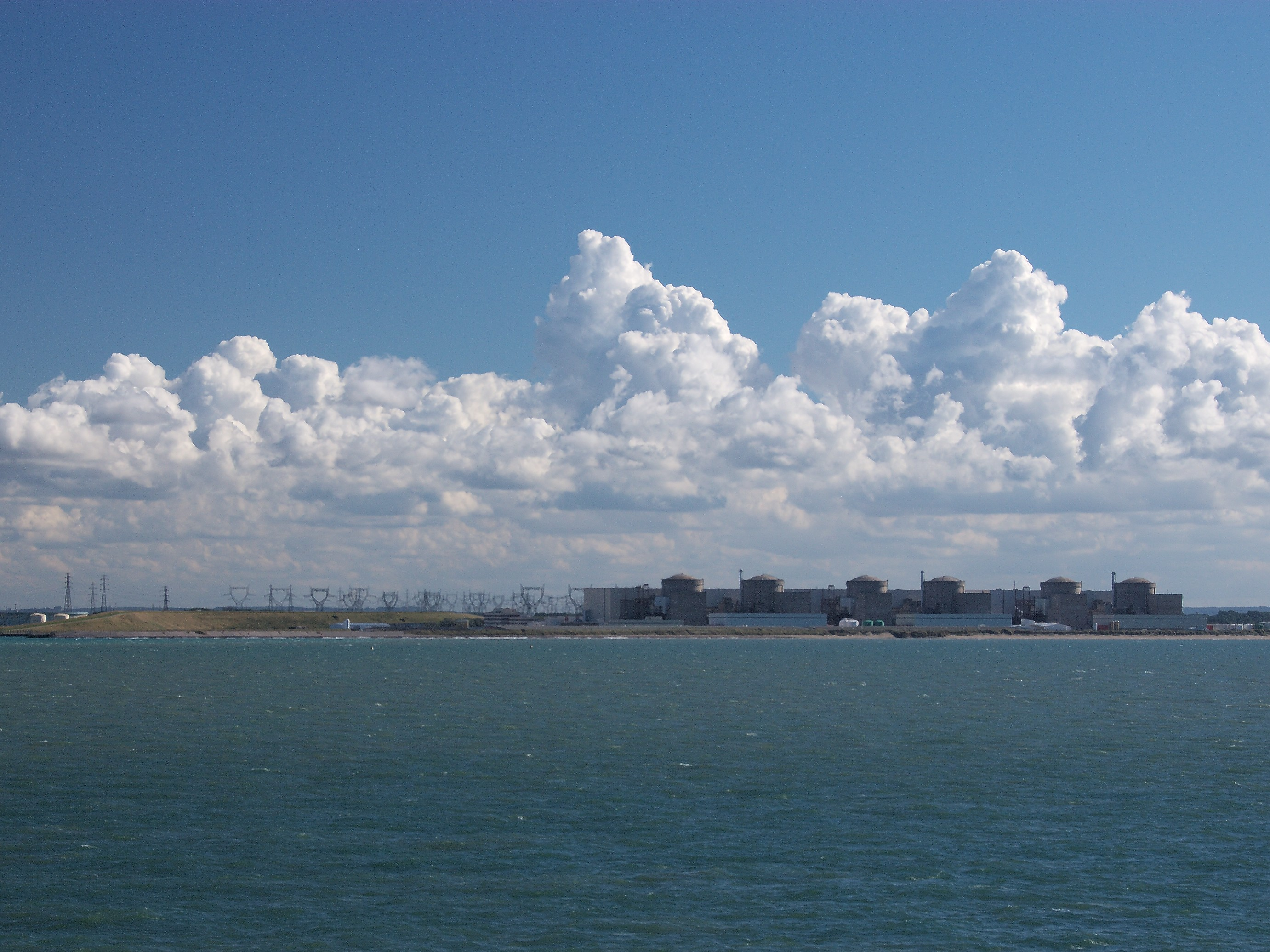
The power station

== Incidents ==
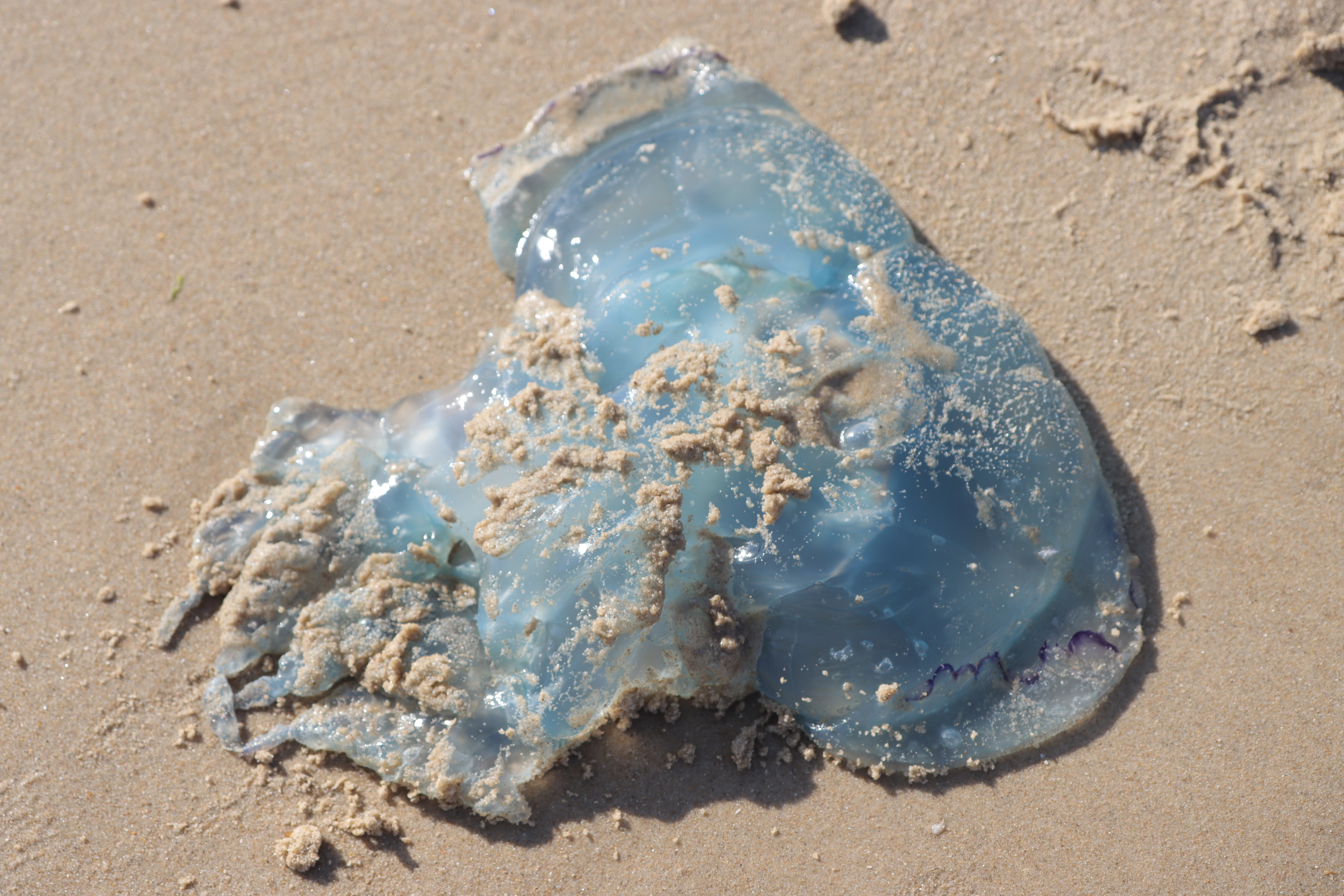
Jellyfish on August 11, 2026 on a beach 40 km west of Gravelines power station

- In 2006, when Unit 3 was taken offline for routine refueling, it was discovered that an electrical wire had not been plugged in correctly during the last outage in 2005. This ranked Level-1 on the INES Scale, the lowest level on the 7-point scale
- In 2007, the plant experienced four separate events that qualified as Level 1 on the INES Scale.
- In August 2009, during the annual exchange of fuel bundles in Reactor-1, one bundle got stuck to the upper handling structure, stopping the operations and causing the evacuation and isolation of the reactor's building.
- On 11 August 2025, the plant was shut down after a swarm of jellyfish clogged the facility's cooling system. Three reactors were shut down again, on 11 August 2026, because of a very large swarm of jellyfish.

== Cooling water ==
The cooling water that carries waste heat from the plant is used for aquaculture of European seabass and gilt-head breams by Acquanord.

== Economics ==
A major OVH datacentre is located next to the power station.

== See also ==
- List of largest power stations in the world
- List of nuclear power stations
- Nuclear power in France
