= Flamanville Nuclear Power Plant =

Nuclear power plant in Manche, France

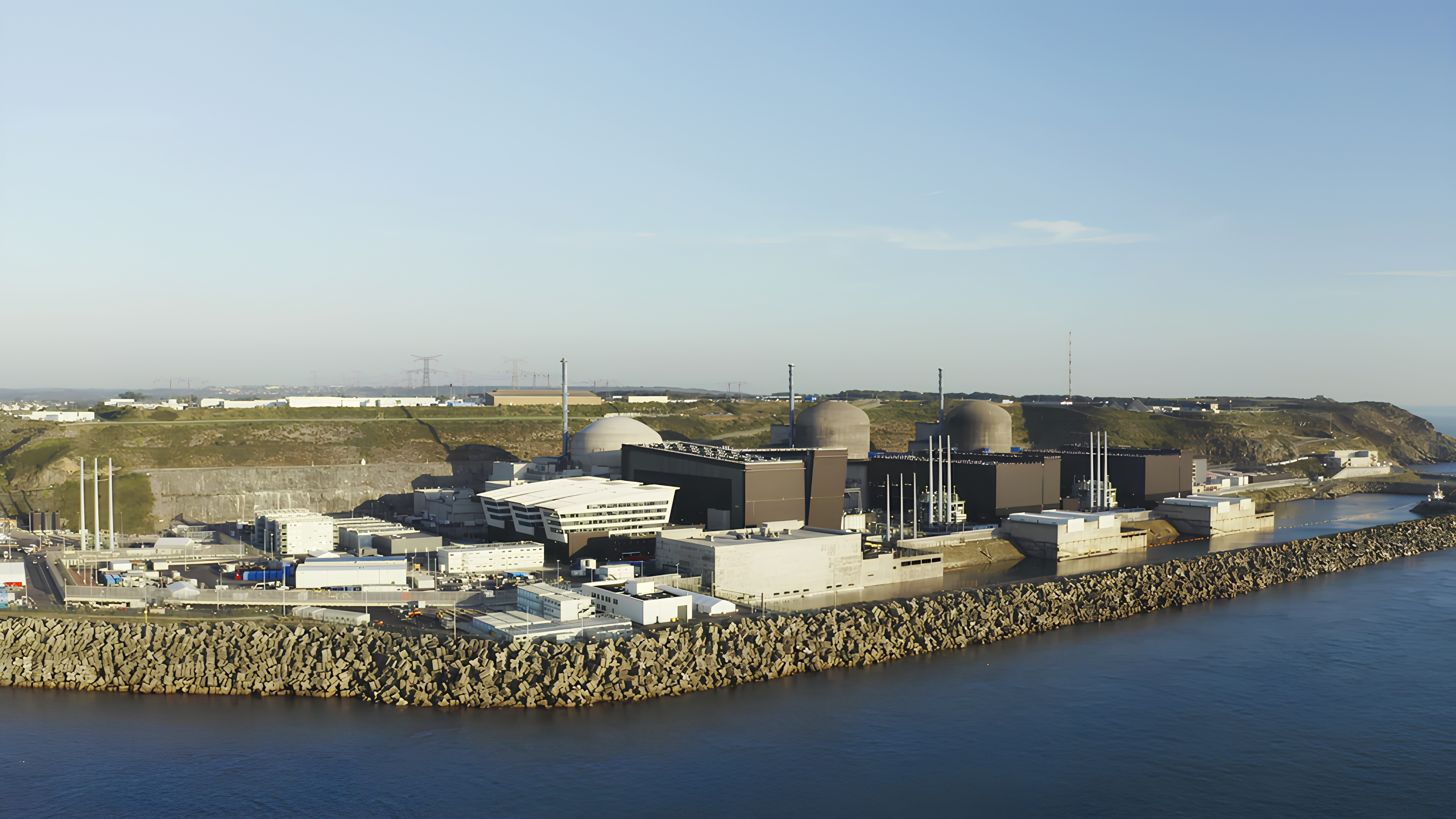
- Flamanville NPP with the two P4 REP reactors on the right and the EPR on the left
- Official name: Centrale Nucléaire de Flamanville
- Country: France
- Location: Flamanville, Manche, Normandy
- Coordinates: 49°32′11″N 1°52′54″W
- Status: Units 1-3: Operational
- Construction began: Unit 1: 1 December 1979; Unit 2: 1 May 1980; Unit 3: 3 December 2007
- Commission date: Unit 1: 1 December 1986; Unit 2: 9 March 1987; Unit 3: 21 December 2024
- Construction cost: Unit 3: €19.3 billion in 2015 prices
- Owner: EDF
- Operator: EDF

Nuclear power station
- Reactor type: PWR
- Reactor supplier: Framatome
- Cooling source: English Channel
- Thermal capacity: 2 × 3817 + 1 x 4300 MW_{th}

Power generation
- Units operational: 2 × 1330 MW, 1 × 1620 MW EPR
- Make and model: Units 1–2: P4 REP 1300; Unit 3: EPR
- Nameplate capacity: 4290 MW
- Capacity factor: 60.08% (2017); 70.55% (lifetime)
- Annual net output: 11.7 TWh (2023)

External links
- Website: Centrale nucléaire de Flamanville
- Commons: Related media on Commons

The Flamanville Nuclear Power Plant is located at Flamanville, Manche, France on the Cotentin Peninsula. The power plant houses three pressurized water reactors (PWRs). Units 1 and 2, rated at 1.33 GW_{e} net each and based on a Westinghouse design, were ordered following the Messmer Plan and deliver full power since 1987. Unit 3 is an EPR unit with a nameplate capacity of 1.65 GW_{e} which was connected to the grid in December 2024 and reached full power in December 2025. The power plant produced 18.9 TWh of energy in 2005, which amounted to 4% of the electricity production in France. In 2006 there were 671 workers regularly working at the plant. In 2023, 11,7 TWh was produced with 1400 regular workers.

Construction of unit 3 began in 2007 with its commercial introduction scheduled for 2012. Areva, the company in charge of the project, proved unable to manage it (just like Olkiluoto 3), leading to the ultimate demise of the company. Various safety problems have been raised, including weakness in the steel used in the reactor. In July 2019, further delays were announced, pushing back the commercial introduction date to the end of 2022. As of 2020 the project was more than five times over budget. In January 2022, more delays were announced, with fuel loading continuing until mid-2023, and again in December 2022, delaying fuel loading to early 2024. Fuel loading was completed in May 2024. The reactor eventually started up in early September 2024 and was connected to the grid at 11:48 AM on 21 December 2024.

== Unit 1 & 2 ==
=== History ===
During the 1970s, Flamanville was one of the proposed construction sites for the French civil nuclear program. A 1975 poll of local inhabitants showed 63.7% in favor of the project.

Following a public inquiry, the formal declaration of public utility was published in 1977, in time for a January 1978 groundbreaking. The official start of construction was recorded as December 1979 for Unit 1 and May 1980 for Unit 2. First criticality was achieved in September 1985 and June 1986, with connections to the grid in December 1985 and July 1986 and full commercial operation in December 1986 and March 1987.

=== Characteristics ===
Units 1 and 2 are Generation II pressurized water reactors of hybrid design, with a nuclear island of type P4 and the conventional / turbine island of type P'4.

The reactor coolant systems (reactor vessel, steam generators, reactor coolant pumps) were furnished by Framatome. The two turbine islands (steam turbines, turbogenerators, auxiliary systems, and secondary-side pumps) were provided by Alstom.

The reactors of units 1 and 2 can produce 3,817 MWt. Gross electric power from the generator is 1,382 MWe, and net electric power, after station consumption, is 1,330 MWe, with a thermal efficiency of 34.8%. In 2025, Units 1 and 2 employed approximately 1,100 EDF employees and contractors, and supplied more than half the electricity required in the Normandy region.

== Unit 3 ==
=== Construction ===
Construction of a new reactor, Flamanville 3, began on 4 December 2007. The new unit is an Areva European Pressurized Reactor type and is planned to have a nameplate capacity of 1,650 MWe. EDF estimated the cost at €3.3 billion and stated it would start commercial operations in 2012, after construction lasting 54 months. The latest cost estimate (July 2020) is at €19.1 billion, with commissioning planned tentatively at the end of 2022.

On 3 December 2012, EDF announced that the estimated costs have escalated to €8.5 billion ($11 billion), and the completion of construction was being delayed to 2016. The next day the Italian power company Enel announced it was relinquishing its 12.5% stake in the project, and five future EPRs. They would be reimbursed for their project stake of €613 million plus interest.

In November 2014, EDF announced that completion of construction was delayed to 2017 due to delays in component delivery by Areva.

In April 2015, Areva informed the French nuclear regulator, Autorité de sûreté nucléaire (ASN), that anomalies had been detected in the reactor vessel steel, causing "lower than expected mechanical toughness values". Segolene Royal, Minister of Ecology, Sustainable Development and Energy in the Second Valls Government, asked the producer for further details and possible consequences.

Various safety problems have been raised, including weakness in the steel used in the reactor together with heterogeneity of the steel alloy forged high integrity components used in the reactor pressure vessel, that have also been shown to be present in Japanese-sourced components that have entered the French nuclear equipment supply chain. The safety of the Flamanville EPR plant has also been questioned due to the danger of flooding of the kind experienced during the 1999 Blayais Nuclear Power Plant flood. In June 2015 multiple faults in cooling system safety valves were discovered by ASN.

In September 2015, EDF announced that the estimated costs had escalated to €10.5 billion, and the start-up of the reactor was delayed to the fourth quarter of 2018. The delays of Unit 3 of Flamanville received additional attention when in December 2016 The Economist reported that the British loan guarantees for Hinkley Point C require Unit 3 to be operational by 2020, that the regulator will rule on the future of Unit 3 mid-2017 and that one possible outcome of this ruling can delay its opening far beyond 2018, thus jeopardizing the British loan guarantees thereby preventing EDF from building the EPRs at Hinkley Point.

In February 2017, renewed delays in the construction of the EPR-reactors at Taishan Nuclear Power Plant prompted EDF to state that Flamanville 3 remains on schedule to start operations by the end of 2018, assuming it receives regulator approval. In June 2017, the French regulator issued a provisional ruling that Flamanville 3 is safe to start.

In January 2018, cold functional tests were completed. In February, EDF found that some secondary cooling circuit welds did not meet specifications, causing EDF to carry out further checks and issue a report. Following this, ASN requested EDF to extend the welding checks to other systems. Hot functional tests had to be postponed.

In July 2018, EDF further delayed fuel loading to Q4 2019 and increased the project's cost estimate by a further €400 million (US$467.1 million). The latest project cost estimates by EDF amounted to €10.9 billion (US$12.75 billion), three times the original cost estimates. Hot testing was pushed back to the end of 2018. In January 2019, a further one-month delay in hot testing was announced.

In June 2019, the regulator ASN determined that eight welds in steam transfer pipes passing through the two-wall containment, that EDF had hoped to repair after startup, must be repaired before the reactor is commissioned. On 29 June 2019, it was announced that the start-up was once again being pushed back, making it unlikely it could be started before the end of 2022. It is estimated the repairs will add €1.5 billion to the costs, bringing the total to €12.4 billion. Further cost increases due to additional time needed to repair 110 defective welds have increased the cost to €12.7 billion.

In July 2020, the French Cour des Comptes finalised an eighteen-month in-depth analysis of the project, concluding that the total estimated cost reaches up to €19.1 billion. The severe delays incurred additional financing costs, as well as added taxes and levies. In a response, EDF did not dispute the findings of the court. In the same month, France's energy minister Barbara Pompili noted the high costs and delays, calling the project "a mess".

In December 2022, EDF announced a further delay of at least six months with an estimated cost increase of €500 million due to more work to establish a new process for the stress relieving heat treatment of some welds close to sensitive equipment. Estimated total costs increased to €13.2 billion.

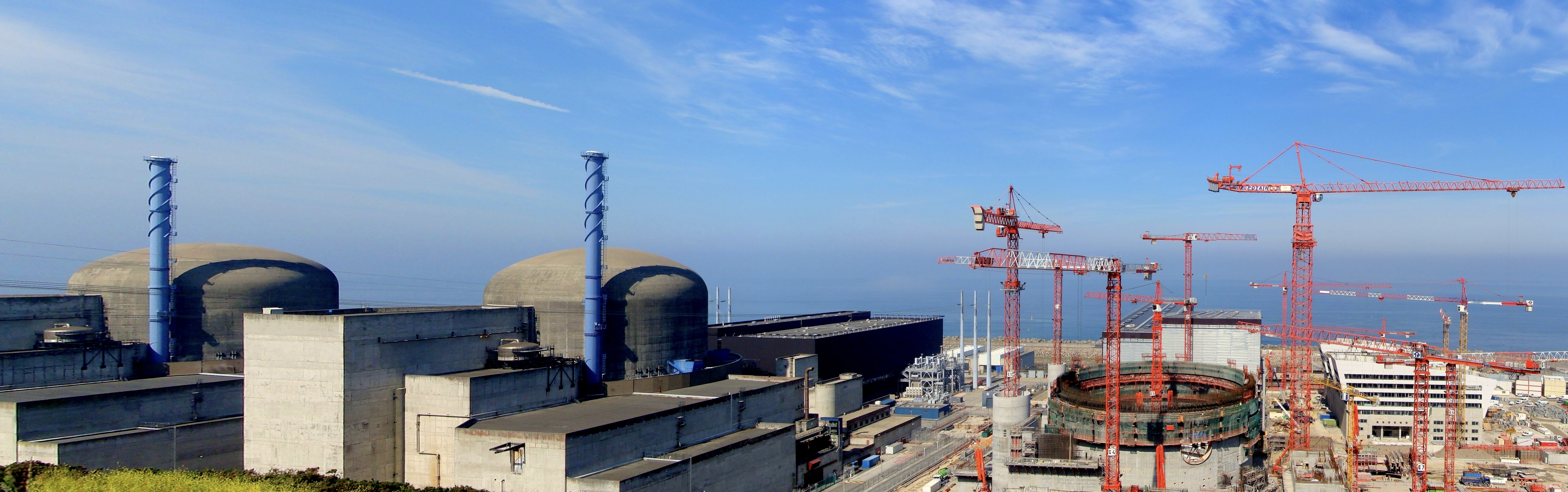
Flamanville Nuclear Power Plant in 2010 during construction of block 3

=== Fuelling and commissioning ===
Fuel loading started on 8 May 2024 and has been completed on 22 May 2024.

On 3 September 2024, the reactor started test operation, but the following day it shut down automatically, possibly due to a configuration error. The reactor suffered a second automatic shutdown on September 17.

On 21 December 2024, the reactor was connected to the national grid, initially producing 100 MW of power. After commissioning tests during the first year of operation, the reactor reached full power for the first time on 14 December 2025.

=== Operation ===
On 5 May 2026, the reactor of Flamanville 3 officially entered into commercial operation, marking the end of the commissioning stage.

On 26 September 2026, Flamanville 3 was shut down for its first scheduled maintenance check, estimated to last for 350 days.

== Incidents ==
On 9 February 2017, a mechanical problem with a fan in the turbine hall of unit 1 caused an explosion and fire, causing five people to be treated for smoke inhalation. While the non-nuclear accident did not cause any radioactive leak, it did cause the number one reactor to be disconnected from the power grid. EDF initially estimated the reactor would be operational within a week, but later estimated the end of March.

Units 1 and 2 were under enhanced surveillance by regulator Autorité de sûreté nucléaire (ASN) from 2019 to 2022 because of shortcomings in some operating activities, a high number of maintenance faults, poor mastery of certain maintenance operations, and inadequate quality of the ten-year inspection documentation of unit 1. This involved about 30 ASN inspections a year.
