= EPR (nuclear reactor) =

Third-generation pressurised water nuclear reactor design

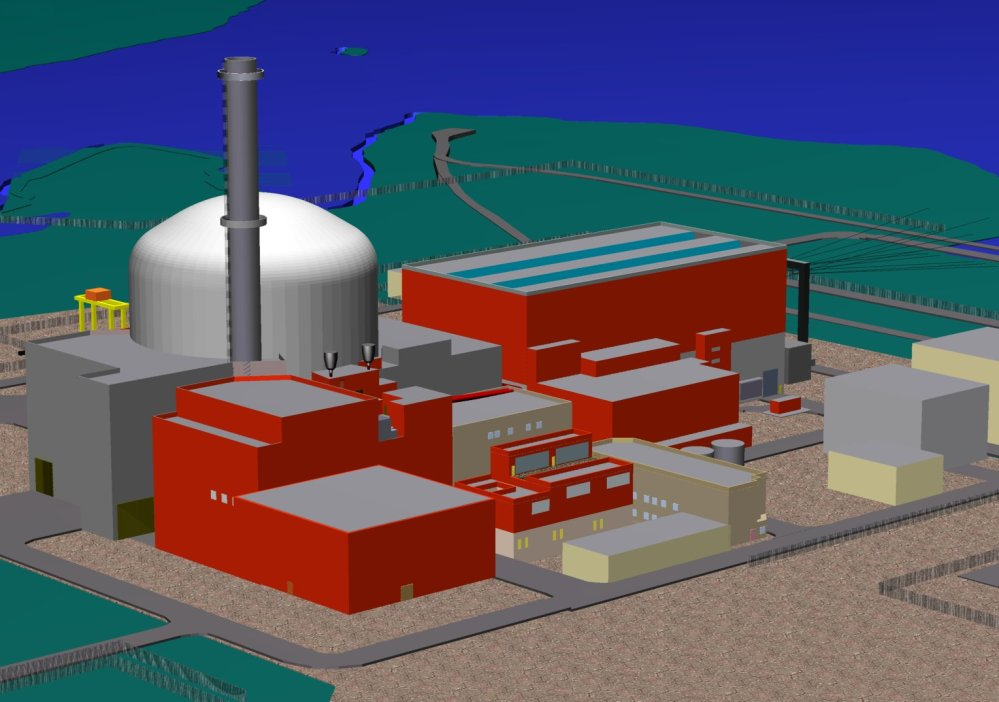
Computer generated view of an EPR power station

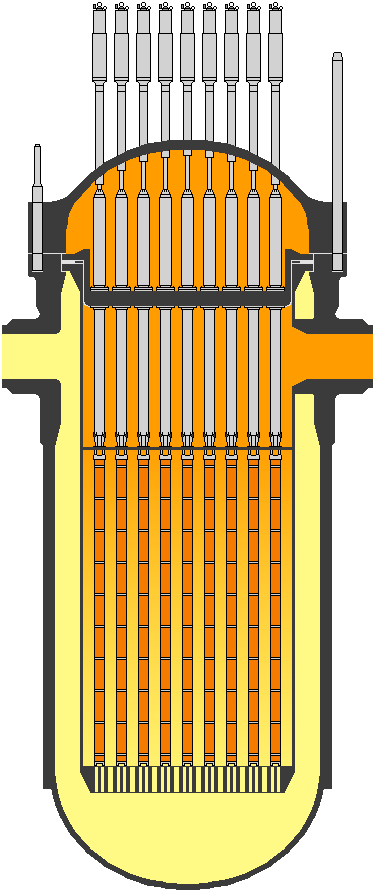
Reactor pressure vessel of the EPR

The EPR is a Generation III+ pressurised water reactor design. It has been designed and developed mainly by Framatome (part of Areva between 2001 and 2017) and Électricité de France (EDF) in France, and by Siemens in Germany. In Europe, this reactor design was called European Pressurised Reactor, and the internationalised name was Evolutionary Power Reactor, but it has been simplified to EPR.

The first operational EPR unit was China's Taishan 1, which started commercial operation in December 2018. Taishan 2 started commercial operation in September 2019. European units have been so far plagued with prolonged construction delays and substantial cost overruns. The first EPR unit to start construction, at Olkiluoto in Finland, originally intended to be commissioned in 2009, started commercial operation in 2023, a delay of fourteen years. The second EPR unit to start construction, at Flamanville in France, also suffered a more than decade-long delay in its commissioning (from 2012 to 2024). Two units at Hinkley Point in the United Kingdom received final approval in September 2016; the first unit was expected to begin operating in 2027, but was subsequently delayed to around 2030.

EDF has acknowledged severe difficulties in building the EPR design. In September 2015, EDF stated that the design of a "New Model" EPR (later named EPR2) was being worked on and that it would be easier and cheaper to build.

EPR type reactor has a design service lifetime of 60 years.

== Design ==
=== First EPR design ===
The main objectives of the third generation EPR design are increased safety while providing enhanced economic competitiveness through improvements to previous pressurised water reactor designs, scaled up to an electrical power output of around 1650 MWe (net) with thermal power of 4500 MW. The reactor can use 5% enriched uranium oxide fuel, reprocessed uranium fuel or 100% mixed uranium plutonium oxide fuel, clad in Areva's M5 variant of zirconium alloy. The EPR is the evolutionary descendant of the Framatome N4 and Siemens Power Generation Division "Konvoi" reactors. Siemens ceased its nuclear activities in 2011. The EPR was designed to use uranium more efficiently than older Generation II reactors, using approximately 17% less uranium per kilowatt-hour of electricity generated than these older reactor technologies.

The design has gone through a number of iterations. The 1994 conceptual design had an electrical power output of 1450 MW, the same as the Framatome N4, but using Siemens Konvoi derived instrumentation and also including a new core catcher safety system. By 1995, there was concern over excessive cost per MW, and output was raised to 1800 MW in the 1997 design, though this was subsequently reduced to 1650 MW (net) in the final certified design. It has 4 coolant loops with 1 steam generator per loop. There are concrete walls between loops and the hot and cold parts of each loop to protect against failures. Besides the double layer containment there is a concrete wall surrounding the primary system components inside the containment.

The EPR design has several active and passive protection measures against accidents:

- Four independent emergency cooling systems, each providing the required cooling of the decay heat (i.e., 300% redundancy)
- Leak-tight containment around the reactor
- An extra container and cooling area if a molten core manages to escape the reactor (see containment building and core catcher)
- Two-layer concrete wall with a total thickness of 2.6 m (8 ft 6 in), designed to withstand impact by aeroplanes and internal overpressure, and a low vacuum in the annulus space between the two layers

The EPR has a design maximum core damage frequency of 5.3 × 10^{−7} per station per year and a gross power output of 1770 MWe for a mains frequency of 50 Hz. The version submitted to the U.S. NRC has an electrical power output of 1600 MW (net).

=== EPR2 design ===
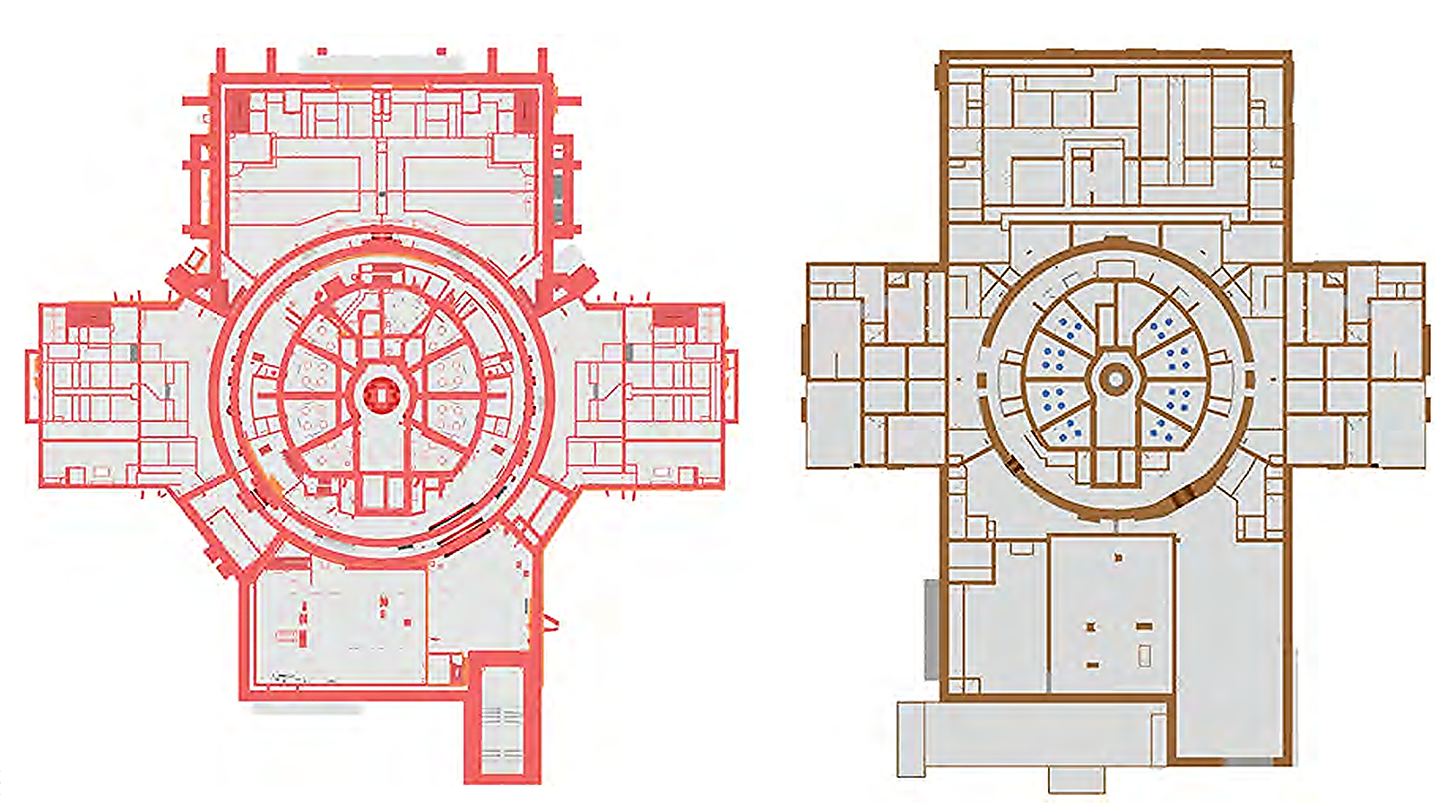
A floor plan of the EPR2 reactor building (right). It has a single-wall prestressed concrete containment structure with a metal liner and fewer angled walls, compared to the original EPR design (left) which has a double-wall prestressed containment structure with a metal liner.

In 2013, EDF acknowledged the difficulties it was having building the EPR design, with its head of production and engineering, Hervé Machenaud, saying EDF had lost its dominant international position in design and construction of nuclear power stations. Machenaud indicated EDF was considering designing two new lower powered reactors, one with output of 1500 MW and the other 1000 MW. Machenaud stated there would be a period of reflection on the best way to improve the EPR design to lower its price and incorporate post-Fukushima safety improvements.

In September 2015, EDF's chief executive Jean-Bernard Lévy stated that the design of a "New Model" EPR, or "EPR2", was being worked on, which would be easier to build, and be ready for orders from about 2020, describing it in 2016 as "a reactor offering the same characteristics as today's EPR but it will be cheaper to build with optimised construction times and costs".

In 2016, EDF planned to build two new model EPR reactors in France by 2030 to prepare for renewing its fleet of older reactors. However, following financial difficulties at Areva and its merger with EDF, French Ecology Minister Nicolas Hulot said in January 2018, "for now [building a new model EPR] is neither a priority or a plan. Right now the priority is to develop renewable energy and to reduce the share of nuclear." The industry-government plan for 2019–2022 included work on "a new version of the EPR".

In July 2019, the French nuclear safety authority ASN issued an opinion on the safety of an outlined new EPR model (EPR2) design. It found that general safety was on the whole satisfactory, though identifying areas for further examination. The most notable simplification is a single layer containment building with a liner as opposed to the EPR's double layer with a liner. ASN highlighted that the EPR design basis assumption that primary and secondary cooling circuit piping would not fail may no longer be appropriate for the simplified EPR2, and requires additional safety demonstrations. Another simplification is that, unlike the first EPR design, the EPR2 design does not allow access to the reactor building for maintenance during reactor operation, which simplifies the design of the reactor building.

In 2020, French Energy Minister Élisabeth Borne announced the French government would not decide on the construction of any new reactors until the much delayed Flamanville 3 started operation after 2022. EDF had estimated that building six EPR2 nuclear reactors would cost at least €46 billion. A Court of Audit report concluded that EDF is no longer able to finance EPR2 construction on its own, so financing and profitability issues need to be resolved. The audit office requires that EDF ensure the financing and profitability of EPR2 before constructing any in France.

In January 2022, junior environment minister Bérangère Abba said that plans for new EPR2 reactors, to be operational between 2035 and 2037, should be submitted around 2023. The decision was accelerated by the impact of the 2021 global energy crisis. In June 2023, EDF announced it was starting the authorisation process to build two EPR2 reactors at Penly Nuclear Power Plant.

The EPR2 requires 250 types of pipes instead of 400 for the EPR, 571 valves instead of 13,300 valves for the EPR, and 100 types of doors instead of 300 in the EPR. The EPR2 also uses more prefabricated components, and the electrical buildings can be completely prefabricated. The fourth emergency/safety cooling system/train of the reactor is removed which means maintenance can only be performed when the plant is shut down. This train was added at the request of German electricians in the original EPR design to allow for on-power maintenance. The core catcher has been modified. It has a net power output of 1670 MWe.

=== EPR1200 design ===
A smaller variant of the EPR2 is being developed using three instead of four coolant loops generating 1200 MW net of electrical power, the EPR1200, intended for export. In February 2023, regulator ASN issued a positive opinion on the safety features of the EPR1200.

=== Technical specifications comparison ===
Specification	EPR-1750	EPR1200
References		
Thermal output, MW	4590	3300
Efficiency, net %	36	
Pressure in the turbine inlet	77.2 bars (7,720 kPa; 1,120 psi)	
Pressure in the primary circuit	155 bars (15,500 kPa; 2,250 psi)	
Coolant temperature at core inlet	295.2 °C (563.4 °F)	
Coolant temperature at core outlet	320 °C (608 °F)	
Active core height	4.2 m (13 ft 9 in)	14 ft
Outer diameter of fuel rods	9.5 mm (0.37 in)	
Number of fuel rods in assembly	265	
Number of fuel assemblies	241	177
Fuel	Uranium dioxide, MOX	
Average uranium enrichment, %	4.95	
Average fuel burnup, MW · day / kg	55–65	

== Power plants ==
List of operational, planned, and closed EPR installations
Power plants			Reactor			Capacity (MW)	Date			Status	Notes	Ref
Unit	Country	Geolocation	Model	Design	Gen	Capacity (MW)	Building	Operational	Closed	Status	Notes	Ref
Olkiluoto 3	Finland		EPR	1	III+	1600	12 Aug 2005	1 May 2023	(2083)	Operational		
Flamanville 3	France		EPR	1	III+	1630	3 Dec 2007	5 May 2026	(2086)	Operational		
Taishan 1	China		EPR	1	III+	1660	18 Nov 2009	14 Dec 2018	(2078)	Operational		
Taishan 2	China		EPR	1	III+	1660	15 Apr 2010	7 Sep 2019	(2079)	Operational		
Hinkley Point C 1	United Kingdom		EPR	1	III+	1600	11 Dec 2018	(2029)		Under construction		
Hinkley Point C 2	United Kingdom		EPR	1	III+	1600	12 Dec 2019	(2030)		Under construction		
Sizewell C 1	United Kingdom		EPR	1	III+	1600	(2025)			Under construction (site preparation underway)		
Sizewell C 2	United Kingdom		EPR	1	III+	1600	(2025)			Under construction (site preparation underway)		
Penly 3	France		EPR	2	III+	1670	(2024)			Under construction (site preparation underway)		
Penly 4	France		EPR	2	III+	1670	(2024)			Under construction (site preparation underway)		
Bugey 6	France		EPR	2	III+	1670				Planned		
Bugey 7	France		EPR	2	III+	1670				Planned		
Gravelines 7	France		EPR	2	III+	1670				Planned		
Gravelines 8	France		EPR	2	III+	1670				Planned		

== Operational plants ==
=== Olkiluoto 3 (Finland) ===
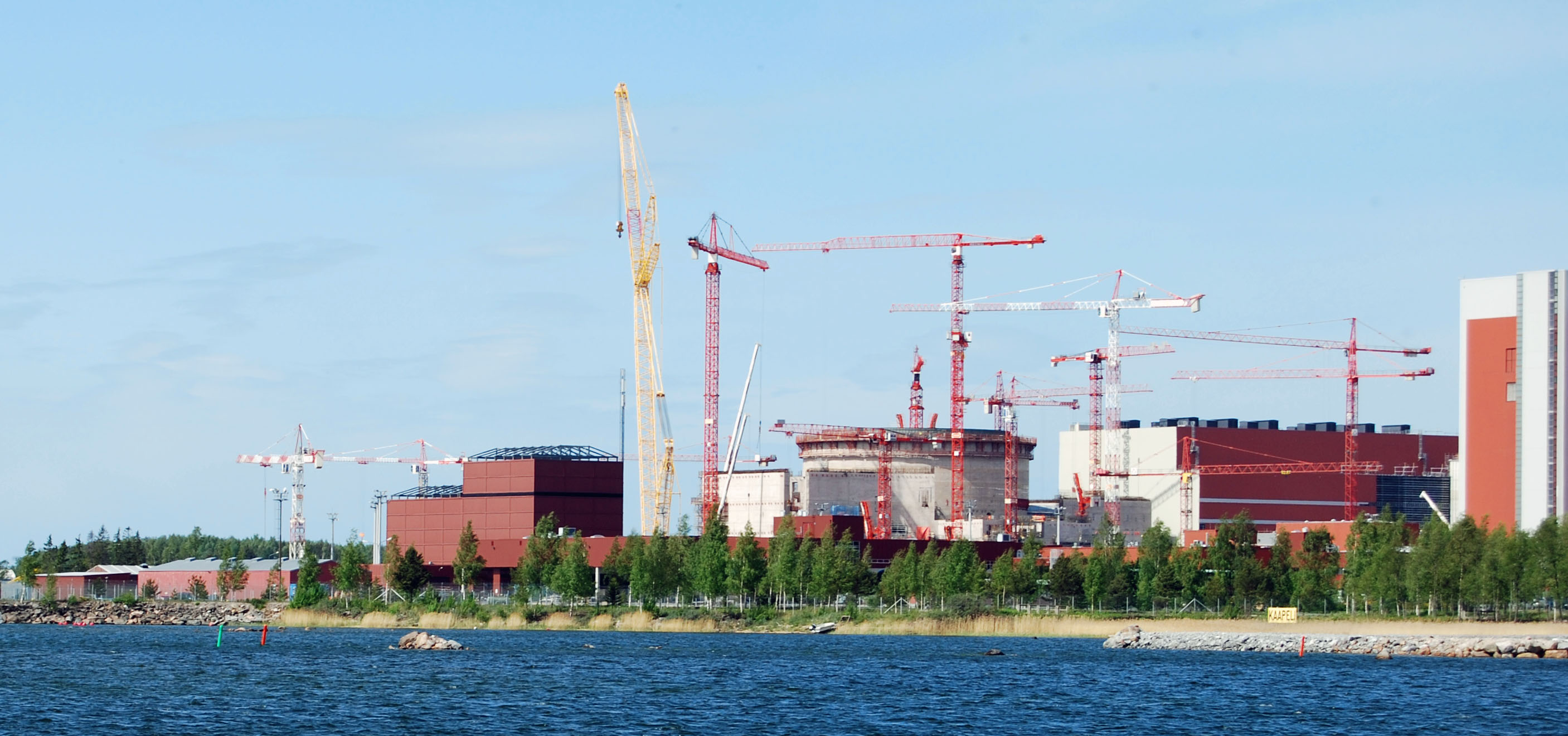
Olkiluoto 3 under construction in 2009. It achieved first criticality in December 2021 and started regular electricity production in April 2023.

Construction of the Olkiluoto 3 power station in Finland began in August 2005. The station has an electrical power output of 1600 MWe (net). The construction was a joint effort of French Areva and German Siemens AG through their common subsidiary Areva NP, for Finnish operator TVO. Siemens ceased nuclear activities in 2011. Initial cost estimates were about €3.7 billion, but the project has since seen several severe cost increases and delays, with latest published cost estimates (from 2012) of more than €8 billion. The station was initially scheduled to go online in 2009.

In May 2006, construction delays of about one year were announced, following quality control problems across the construction. In part, the delays were due to the lack of oversight of subcontractors inexperienced in nuclear construction. The delays led to disappointing financial results for Areva. It blamed delays on the Finnish approach to approving technical documentation and designs.

In December 2006, TVO announced construction was about 18 months behind schedule so completion was now expected 2010–11, and there were reports that Areva was preparing to take a €500 million charge on its accounts for the delay.

At the end of June 2007, it was reported that Säteilyturvakeskus (STUK), the Finnish Radiation and Nuclear Safety Authority, had found a number of safety-related design and manufacturing 'deficiencies'. In August 2007, a further construction delay of up to a year was reported associated with construction problems in reinforcing the reactor building to withstand an aeroplane crash, and the timely supply of adequate documentation to the Finnish authorities.

In September 2007, TVO reported the construction delay as "at least two years" and costs more than 25% over budget. Cost estimates by analysts for the overrun range up to €1.5 billion.

A further delay was announced in October 2008, making the total delay three years, giving an expected online date of 2012. The parties entered into arbitration to resolve a dispute over responsibility for the delays and final cost overruns. Areva settled the long-running dispute in 2018 by agreeing to pay €450 million for cost overruns and delays.

As of May 2009, the station was at least three and a half years behind schedule and more than 50 percent over-budget. Areva and the utility involved "are in bitter dispute over who will bear the cost overruns and there is a real risk now that the utility will default". In August 2009, Areva announced €550 million additional provisions for the build, taking station costs to €5.3 billion, and wiped out interim operating profits for the first half-year of 2009.

The dome of the containment structure was topped out in September 2009. 90% of procurement, 80% of engineering works and 73% of civil works were completed.

In June 2010, Areva announced €400 million of further provisions, taking the cost overrun to €2.7 billion. The timescale slipped from June 2012 to the end of 2012. In December 2011, TVO announced a further delay to August 2014. As of July 2012, the station was scheduled to start electricity production no earlier than 2015, a schedule slippage of at least six years. In December 2012 Areva's Chief Executive estimated costs to €8 billion.

In September 2014, Areva announced that operations would start in 2018. In October 2017, the date was pushed back to the spring of 2019. During testing between 2018 and 2021, multiple further delays were announced, of around three years in total.

Olkiluoto 3 achieved first criticality in December 2021. Grid connection took place in March 2022. In May 2022, foreign material was found in the turbine steam reheater, and the plant was shut down for about three months of repair work. Regular production had been expected to begin in December 2022, after a test production phase. On 28 October 2022, it was announced cracks of a few centimetres had been found in all four of the feedwater pump impellers. The cause of the cracks was yet to be determined, and it was unclear how the commissioning schedule would be affected. The feedwater pumps are larger than in other nuclear reactors.

Olkiluoto 3 started regular electricity production in April 2023.

=== Flamanville 3 (France) ===
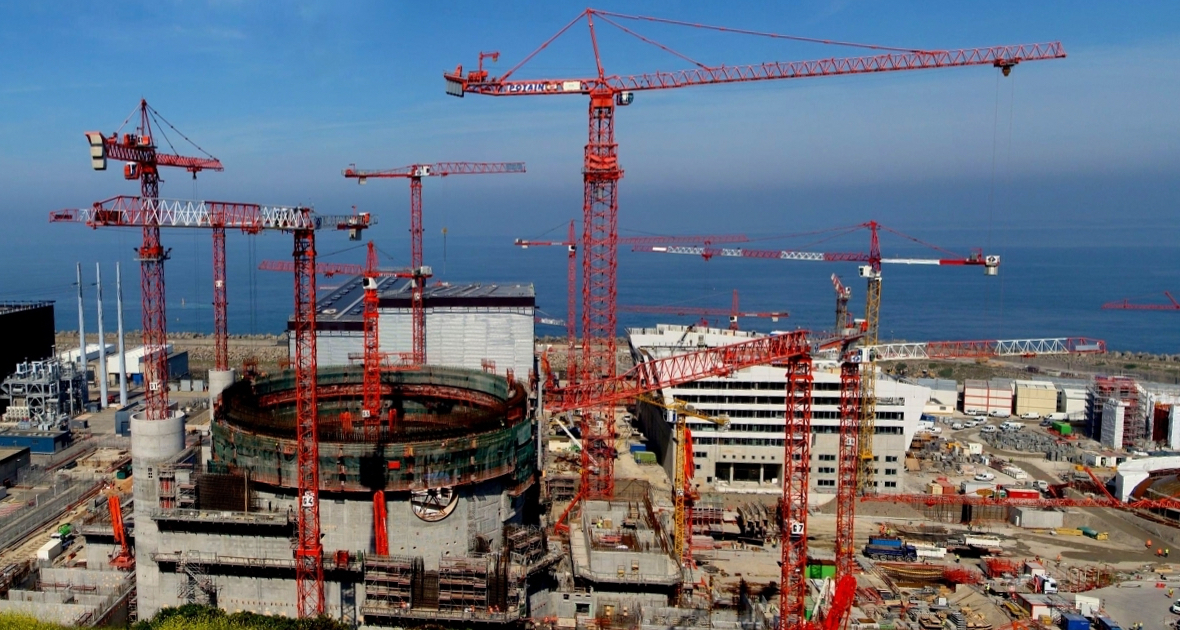
Flamanville 3 under construction in 2010. It achieved first criticality in September 2024 and was connected to the grid in December 2024.

First concrete was poured for the demonstration EPR reactor at the Flamanville Nuclear Power Plant on 6 December 2007. As the name implies, this will be the third nuclear reactor on the Flamanville site, and the second instance of an EPR being built. Electrical output will be 1630 MWe (net). The project was planned to involve around €3.3 billion of capital expenditure from EDF.

From 19 October 2005 to 18 February 2006, the project was submitted to a national public debate. On 4 May 2006, the decision was made by EDF's Board of Directors to continue with the construction. Between 15 June and 31 July 2006, the unit underwent a public enquiry, which rendered a "favourable opinion" on the project. That summer, site preparation works began.

In December 2007, construction of the unit itself began. This was expected to last 54 months, with commissioning planned for 2012.

In April 2008, the French nuclear safety authority (Autorité de sûreté nucléaire, ASN) reported that a quarter of the welds inspected in the secondary containment steel liner are not in accordance with norms, and that cracks have been found in the concrete base. EDF stated that progress was being made on these issues, which were raised very early in construction; however, on 21 May, ASN ordered a suspension of concrete pouring on the site. A month later, concreting work resumed after ASN accepted EDF's corrective action plan, which included external oversight checks.

In May 2009, Stephen Thomas reported that after 18 months of construction, and after a series of quality control problems, the project is "more than 20 percent over budget and EDF is struggling to keep it on schedule".

In August 2010, the regulator, ASN, reported further welding problems on the secondary containment steel liner. The same month, EDF announced that costs had increased 50% to €5 billion, and commissioning was delayed by about two years to 2014.

In July 2011, EDF announced that the estimated costs had escalated to €6 billion, and that completion of construction was delayed to 2016.

In December 2012, EDF announced that the estimated costs had escalated to €8.5 billion. Also in December 2012, the Italian power company Enel announced it was relinquishing its 12.5% stake in the project, and five future EPRs, so would be reimbursed its project stake of €613 million, plus interest.

In November 2014, EDF announced that completion of construction was delayed to 2017, due to delays in component delivery by Areva.

In April 2015, Areva informed the French nuclear regulator ASN that anomalies had been detected in the reactor vessel steel, causing "lower than expected mechanical toughness values". Further tests are underway. In July 2015 The Daily Telegraph reported that Areva had been aware of this problem since 2006. In June 2015, multiple faults in cooling system safety valves were discovered by ASN. In September 2015, EDF announced that the estimated costs had escalated to €10.5 billion, and the start-up of the reactor was delayed to the fourth quarter of 2018.

In April 2016, ASN announced that additional weak spots had been found in the reactor steel, and Areva and EDF responded that new tests would be conducted, though construction work would continue.

In February 2017, the Financial Times stated the project was six years late, and €7.2 billion over budget, while renewed delays in the construction of the EPR-reactors at Taishan Nuclear Power Plant prompted EDF to state that Flamanville 3 remains on schedule to start operations by the end of 2018, assuming it receives regulatory approval. In June 2017, the French regulator issued a provisional ruling that Flamanville 3 is safe to start.

The discovery of quality deviations in the welding led to a further revision of the schedule in July 2018. Fuel loading was delayed until the end of 2019, and the cost estimate was increased from €10.5 billion to €10.9 billion.

In June 2019, nuclear regulator ASN determined that eight welds in steam transfer pipes passing through the two wall containment, that EDF had hoped to repair after startup, must be repaired before the reactor is commissioned. By then, estimated costs were €11 billion.

In October 2019, EDF announced that because of this issue costs would increase to €12.4 billion and that fuel loading would be delayed until the end of 2022. Pierre Moscovici, president of the Court of Audit, gave a statement on 9 July 2020 concerning the release of the report on the delay costs of the Flamanville 3. The report of the Court of Audit revealed that the costs could reach €19.1 billion instead of €12.4 billion when taking into account the additional charges due to the delay in construction.

In January 2022, it was announced that more time was needed for the repair of faulty welds and the solving of other issues. In December 2022, EDF announced a further delay of at least six months with an estimated cost increase of €500 million due to more work to establish a new process for the stress relieving heat treatment of some welds close to sensitive equipment. Fuel loading started in May 2024. Estimated total costs increased to €13.2 billion., which would bring the specific costs to €8090 per kW net electric capacity.

Flamanville 3 achieved first criticality in September 2024. Grid connection took place in December 2024.

In December 2025, following an authorization from the French nuclear safety and radiation protection authority (ASNR), Flamanville 3 achieved 100% of its nuclear thermal power, outputting 1669 MW of gross electrical power.

=== Taishan 1 and 2 (China) ===
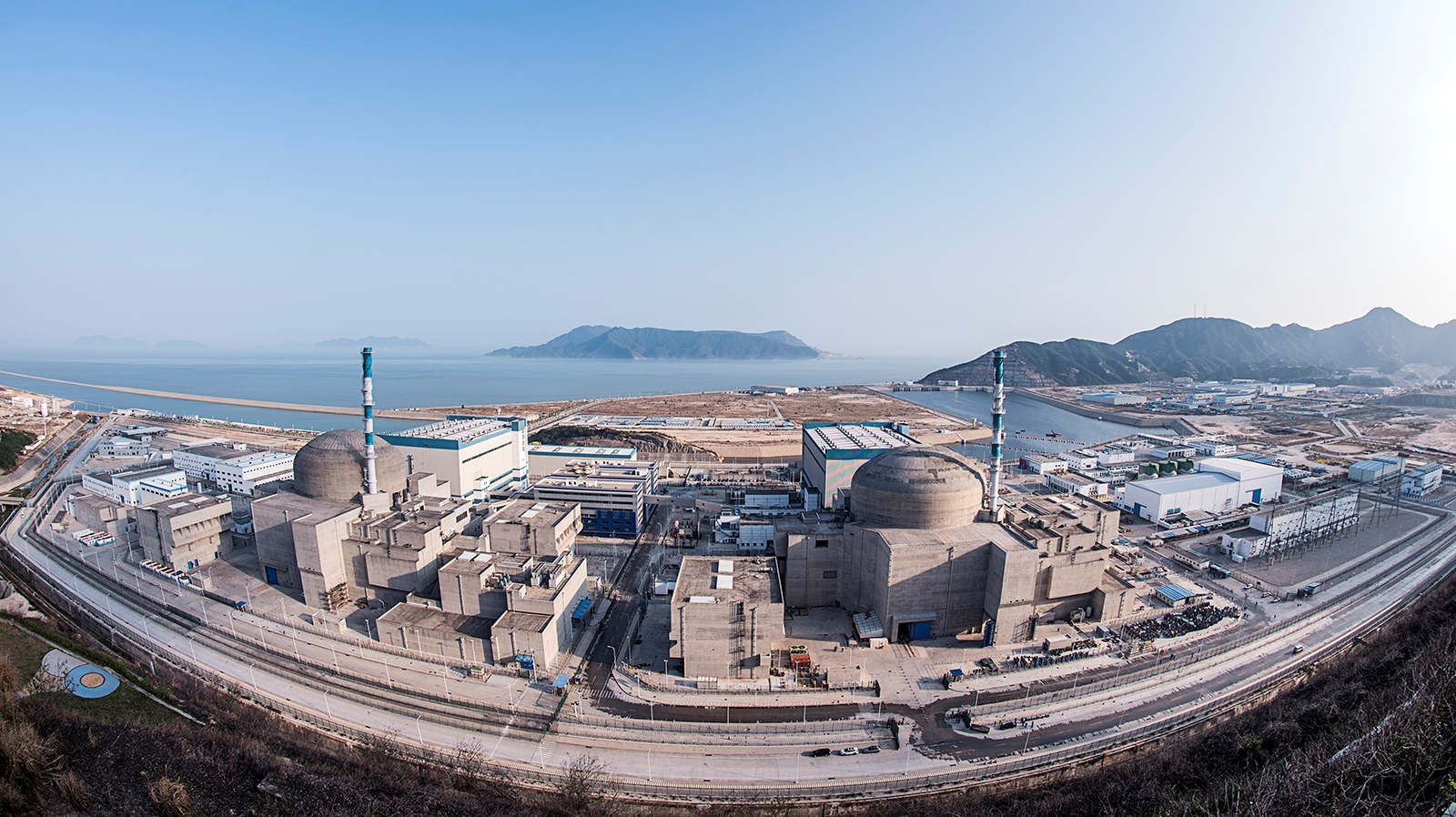
Taishan Nuclear Power Plant - Units 1 & 2

In 2006, Areva took part in the first bidding process for the construction of four new nuclear reactors in China, together with Toshiba-owned Westinghouse and Russian Atomstroyexport. However Areva lost this bid in favour of Westinghouse's AP1000 reactors, in part because of Areva's refusal to transfer the expertise and knowledge to China.

Subsequently, Areva managed to win a deal in February 2007, worth about €8 billion ($10.5 billion) for two EPRs located in Taishan, Guangdong Province in southern China, in spite of sticking to its previous conditions. The General Contractor and Operator is the China General Nuclear Power Group (CGN).

The construction of the first reactor at Taishan started officially on 18 November 2009, and the second on 15 April 2010. Construction of each unit was then planned to take 46 months, significantly faster and cheaper than the first two EPRs in Finland and France.

The reactor pressure vessel of the first reactor was installed in June 2012, and the second in November 2014. The first pressure vessel had been imported from Mitsubishi Heavy Industries in Japan, and steam generators from Areva in France. The second pressure vessel and associated steam generators had been made in China, by Dongfang Electric and Shanghai Electric.

In 2014, construction was reported to be running over two years late, mainly due to key component delays and project management issues.

Cold function tests were performed on Taishan 1 in February 2016, with start up expected in the first half of 2017. Taishan 2 was scheduled to start up later that year. However, commissioning dates were put back six months in February 2017, with commercial operation expected in the second half of 2017 and the first half of 2018.

In December 2017, Hong Kong media reported that a component had cracked during testing, needing to be replaced. In January 2018, commissioning was rescheduled again, with commercial operation expected in 2018 and 2019.

In June 2018, Taishan 1 achieved criticality for the first time. On 29 June 2018, Taishan 1 was connected to the grid. It entered commercial operation in December 2018. Taishan 2 reached these milestones in May 2019 June 2019 and September 2019, respectively.

The Taishan project is led by Taishan Nuclear Power Joint Venture Co. (TNPJVC), a joint venture founded by CGN (51% ownership stake), EDF (30%), and Chinese utility Guangdong Energy Group (19%), also known as Yuedian.

Companies involved in supplying equipment to Taishan Unit 1 include Framatome, which manufactured the steam generators and pressuriser in France, and China's Dongfang Electric Corp. (DEC), which manufactured the Arabelle turbine in the engine room. That turbine was designed and licensed by General Electric. Other equipment suppliers for Unit 1 include Mitsubishi (reactor vessel); Škoda, a Czech company (core internals); and France's Jeumont Electric, which along with DEC provided primary pumps.

In April 2020, Framatome signed a long-term service contract with TNPJVC to support operations of the two EPRs. This contract covers nuclear plant outage and maintenance work, including spare parts supply and engineering services for eight years.

In June 2021, higher than expected concentrations of radioactive gases were detected in the primary circuit of unit 1. This was later attributed to faulty fuel cladding. The reactor was taken offline in July 2021 and restarted in August 2022.

== Plants under construction ==
=== Hinkley Point C (United Kingdom) ===
Hinkley Point C is a nuclear power station under construction with two EPR reactors and an electrical output of 3,200 MWe in Somerset, England.

The EPR underwent Generic Design Assessment by the Office for Nuclear Regulation, along with the Westinghouse AP1000. Interim Design Acceptance Confirmations were postponed until lessons from the Fukushima Daiichi nuclear disaster had been taken into account. EDF bought British Energy in 2009. EDF planned to build four new EPRs, subject to electricity pricing agreement with the government. Areva has signed a strategic partnership with Rolls-Royce to support the build of EPRs. On 19 March 2013, the Development Consent Order granting planning permission for Hinkley Point C was given, but negotiations with the UK government about electricity pricing, and project financing with private investors, still needed to be concluded.

On 21 October 2013, EDF Energy announced that an agreement had been reached regarding the nuclear stations to be built on the site of Hinkley Point C. EDF Group and the UK Government agreed on the key commercial terms of the investment contract. The final investment decision was conditional on completion of the remaining key steps, including the agreement of the European Commission.

On 8 October 2014, the European Commission announced their agreement, with 16 out of 28 commissioners agreeing with the go ahead of the construction. On 21 September 2015, the British government announced it would provide a £2 billion support package for Hinkley Point C as Britain's first nuclear power station in 20 years.

On 21 October 2015, during Chinese leader Xi Jinping's state visit to the United Kingdom, EDF and CGN signed an investment agreement for the £18 billion (€21.1 billion) project to build two reactors at Hinkley Point.

In June 2016, EDF managers told Members of Parliament that the Hinkley Point C proposal should be postponed, until it has "solved a litany of problems", including EDF's "soaring debts". On 28 July 2016, after the resignation of a board member, the EDF board approved the final investment decision for the project. However Greg Clark, the new Secretary of State for Business, Energy and Industrial Strategy in the new government of Theresa May, then announced that the government would not sign the contract over the next few days as expected, but delay the contract to autumn to "consider carefully all the component parts of this project". Final government approval was given in September 2016.

In July 2017, following an internal review, EDF announced revised estimates for the scheme, which included at least £1.5 billion of additional costs and up to 15 months of additional programme, leading to updated total cost estimates of £19.6–20.3 billion. After a number of subsequent cost increases and delays, costs are now estimated to be between £31 and £35 billion (€36.3–41 billion), with the first unit estimated to start generating electricity around 2030.

The approximate 2,000 cubic metres (71,000 cu ft) concrete pour for the first reactor started on 11 December 2018. It was completed over a 30-hour period, creating the first part of the unit one 4,500 tonne base, a platform 3.2 metres (10 ft 6 in) thick. The reactor building will be built on the (to be completed) platform. This construction start marks the first new reactor build in the UK after a 30-year break, and the second PWR in the UK, after Sizewell B.

Completion of the base for the first reactor, the final 8,954 cubic metres (316,200 cu ft) of concrete, was achieved in June 2019. Completion of the base for the second reactor, 8,991 cubic metres (317,500 cu ft) of concrete, was achieved in June 2020.

In February 2023, the first nuclear reactor pressure vessel was delivered to site via the Bristol Channel Hinkley-dedicated wharf at Combwich. The pressure vessel was built in France in 2022 by Framatome.

In January 2024, EDF presented three scenarios for the works, including when Unit 1 would become operational; with planned installation productivity a 2029 start costing £31 billion (2015 prices, £41.6 billion in 2024 prices), with less favourable installation productivity a 2030 start costing £34 billion (2015 prices, £46.5 billion in 2024 prices) or an unfavourable scenario with 2031 start costing £35 billion (2015 prices, £47.9 billion in 2024 prices).

In May 2024, the first of the 520-tonne steam generators was delivered to site in the same manner as the reactor pressure vessel.

In February 2026, EDF updated the timeline and costs, now expecting the first reactor to come online in 2030 and total costs to rise to £35 billion (2015 prices, more than £48 billion in 2026 prices), i.e. almost double the initial cost and 13 years after construction started. These costs are equivalent to more than €16,800 per kW net electric capacity.

=== Sizewell C (United Kingdom) ===
The two EPR units at Sizewell C received planning approval on 20 July 2022 and were granted a nuclear site licence on 7 May 2024. As of 2017, electricity production was expected to start in 2031 at the earliest. Site preparation work officially began on 15 January 2024.

== Possible future power stations ==
=== France ===
In July 2008, the French President announced a second EPR would be built in France due to high oil and gas prices. Penly was chosen as the site in 2009, with construction planned to start in 2012. However, in 2011, following the Fukushima Daiichi nuclear disaster, EDF postponed public consultations. In February 2013, the Minister of Industrial Renewal Arnaud Montebourg stated that the plans for a new EPR reactor at Penly had been cancelled, citing the capacity for electricity production and massive investments in renewable energy along with his confidence in the EPR as a competitive project in foreign countries.

Plans to build new reactors in France were later revived. Penly and Gravelines are among the candidates for the installation of a pair of EPR reactors.

In October 2019, newspaper Le Monde reported that the French government had sent EDF a "mission letter" in which it asked the company to prepare to build a total of six EPR reactors across three sites in the next 15 years. A government decision on the construction of new reactors was not expected until after 2022. EDF has submitted a proposal to build six EPR2s for around €50 billion. In February 2022, French president Emmanuel Macron announced that France would in fact build six new EPR2 reactors, the first to be commissioned by 2035, and with an option for eight more.

In June 2023, EDF announced it was starting the authorisation process to build two EPR2 reactors at Penly Nuclear Power Plant, anticipating that site preparatory work would begin in summer 2024 and construction would start about 2027. In 2024, the French government was considering providing EDF with interest-free reactor development loans and a long-term electricity price guarantee to support EPR2 builds. Three dual reactor plants were estimated to cost €51.7 billion.

In March 2024, media reported that expected costs for the six reactors had increased to €67.4 billion, equivalent to €6800 per kW net electric capacity. In January 2025, the Court of Audit reported that France was "far from ready" to start building EPR2 reactors due to financing uncertainties and the unpreparedness of the construction supply chain.

In March 2025, the Nuclear Policy Council agreed that a subsidised government loan, possibly zero-interest, should be made available to cover at least half the build cost of six EPR2 reactors, though this will need European Union state-subsidy approval. A Contract for Difference at no more than €100 per MWh would cover the remaining costs. However it delayed the planned commissioning of EPR2 reactors by three years to 2038, though the construction start target remained at 2027. The first three pairs of EPR2 reactors are proposed for the Penly, Gravelines and Bugey sites. EDF is expected to make a final investment decision in 2026.

In December 2025, EDF reported that the cost for the six reactors was now €72.8 billion (2020 prices), approved investing €2.7 billion in 2026, and were targeting 2038 for commissioning of the first reactor at Penly, with subsequent reactors following "at intervals of 12 to 18 months". These estimates are equivalent to €7,300 (2020 prices, ~€8,900 in 2025 prices) per kW net electric capacity. In November 2026, the French audit office estimated the total cost to be €84 billion in 2025 prices, warning that at electricity prices below €70/MWh additional subsidy beyond the agreed subsidised government loans would be needed, possibly impacting government debt by up to €65 billion.

=== India ===
In February 2009, the Nuclear Power Corporation of India (NPCIL) signed a memorandum of understanding with Areva to set up two EPR reactors at Jaitapur in Maharashtra. This was followed by a framework agreement in December 2010.

In January 2016, during French president François Hollande's state visit to India a joint statement with Indian Prime Minister Narendra Modi was issued. According to the statement the two leaders "have agreed on a roadmap of cooperation to speed up discussions on the Jaitapur project".

In March 2018, an Industrial Way Forward Agreement between EDF and NPCIL was signed, with an objective of producing a tender for six reactors.

In April 2021, EDF submitted to NPCIL an offer to develop six EPR reactors at the Jaitapur site, with a combined installed capacity of 9.6 GWe.

=== United Kingdom ===
Two further EPR units have been proposed for construction at the Moorside site near Sellafield, Cumbria, as part of a future clean energy hub that would also incorporate modular reactors, renewable energy generation, hydrogen production and battery storage technologies.

=== Kazakhstan ===
The EPR-1200, a 1200 MWe version of the EPR, is one of four potential nuclear reactors Kazakhstan is considering for its second nuclear power plant.

== Unsuccessful proposals ==
=== Canada ===
EPR was considered for the two (possible expansion to four) reactor addition to the Darlington Nuclear Generating Station in Ontario, Canada. However, the official bids had to include all contingencies, and Areva failed to enter a final bid meeting these requirements. The project was ultimately abandoned when the only bid, made by Canada's AECL, came in at well over $10/Wp.

EPR was briefly considered for an installation in New Brunswick, replacing or supplanting that province's single CANDU 6. These plans lasted only from June 2010 until an election two months later, when the plan immediately disappeared from further study.

=== Czech Republic ===
In October 2012, Czech utility company ČEZ announced that Areva was eliminated from a tender for the construction of two reactors for Temelín nuclear plant. Areva failed to comply with legal requirements of the tender. In April 2014, ČEZ cancelled the tender, because of low power prices and the government's refusal to support a minimum guaranteed energy price.

In June 2021, the Czech Ministry of Industry and Trade invited EDF, along with Westinghouse and Korea Hydro & Nuclear Power (KHNP) to participate in a pre-qualification round for a new unit at the Dukovany Nuclear Power Station. EDF was proposing the 1200 MWe version of the EPR (EPR-1200) for the project. In February 2024, the tender was changed to binding offers for up to four new units. In July 2024, KHNP was selected as the preferred bidder.

=== Finland ===
In 2010, the Finnish parliament decided to allow two new reactors. Both TVO and Fennovoima were considering the EPR. In December 2013, Fennovoima confirmed it had selected a Russian AES-2006 VVER pressurised water reactor in preference to the EPR. In May 2022, after significant delays in the design and licensing phase of the project and in light of the 2022 Russian invasion of Ukraine, Fennovoima cancelled the contract with Rosatom to build the power plant.

=== Italy ===
On 24 February 2009, Italy and France agreed to study the feasibility of building four new nuclear power stations in Italy. Following this, on 3 August 2009, EDF and Enel established a joint venture, Sviluppo Nucleare Italia, to study the feasibility of building at least four EPRs.

However, in the 2011 referendum, soon after the Fukushima nuclear disaster, Italians voted to repeal the new regulations permitting nuclear power in Italy. Abrogation of laws is put in effect when at least 50%+1 electors make a valid vote and a majority of these voters are in favour of abrogation. In this referendum, there was a 55% valid voter turnout and 94% voted to abrogate the new regulations.

=== Poland ===
In October 2021, EDF made an offer to Poland to build four or six EPR reactors across two to three sites. The combined installed capacity of the reactors would be either 6.6 or 9.9 GWe.

In October 2022, Poland selected Westinghouse's AP1000 design, with construction of the first three-unit plant expected to start in 2026.

=== United Arab Emirates ===
In March 2008, French president Nicolas Sarkozy reached an agreement with the UAE cabinet that "outlines a cooperation framework for the assessment and possible use of nuclear energy for peaceful ends". This agreement was not a contract for EPR construction by any of the French nuclear companies, Total S.A., Suez or Areva.

In May 2009, US President Barack Obama signed a similar agreement with the UAE. Contracts for reactors were not given, nor was there any guarantee made that US companies would receive them.

In December 2009, the United Arab Emirates declined both the American and French bids and awarded a contract for construction of four non-EPR stations (APR-1400) to a South Korean group including Korea Electric Power Corporation, Hyundai Engineering and Construction, Samsung and Doosan Heavy Industries.

After losing this order, Areva considered whether it should reintroduce the marketing of a smaller and simpler second-generation reactor design alongside the EPR, for countries that are new to nuclear power. As of 2011 Areva and Mitsubishi Heavy Industries offer a smaller 1100 MWe ATMEA1 Generation III PWR.

=== United States ===
The US-EPR, the version of the EPR submitted to the U.S. regulator, is one of the competitors for the next generation of nuclear stations in the United States, along with the AP1000 and the ESBWR. In February 2015, Areva asked to suspend the Design Certification Application Review process at the U.S. Nuclear Regulatory Commission (NRC). It had been under review there with expectation to submit an application for final design approval and standard design certification since 14 December 2007. UniStar, Amarillo Power, PPL Corp and AmerenUE announced plans to file a Combined Construction and Operating License application in 2008 for the US-EPR at its Callaway station. UniStar filed a partial application in July 2007 for a proposed third unit at the Calvert Cliffs Nuclear Power Plant in Maryland. However, both proposals were subsequently cancelled.

In April 2009, Missouri legislators balked at preconstruction rate increases, prompting AmerenUE to suspend plans for its reactor. In July 2010, Constellation Energy Group cut spending on UniStar for the Calvert Cliffs Nuclear Power Station because of uncertainties for a loan guarantee from the U.S. Department of Energy, and subsequently pulled out of the project. In October 2008, Areva announced that it would partner with US defense firm Northrop Grumman to establish a $380 million facility to construct modules and assemblies for the EPR and US-EPR reactors at Northrop Grumman's Newport News Shipyard in Virginia. The project was suspended indefinitely in May 2011.

== See also ==
- Economics of new nuclear power plants
- Nuclear power by country

Other Generation III+ designs:

- US-APWR
- ACR
