= Atmea =

Nuclear reactor design

Atmea was a joint venture between Mitsubishi Heavy Industries (MHI) and EDF Group set up in 2006 to develop, market, license and sell the ATMEA1 reactor, a new generation III+, medium-power pressurized water reactor (PWR). The company was headquartered in Paris. The joint venture was abandoned in 2019.

== History ==
A memorandum of understanding between AREVA and MHI effectively creating the entity was signed 19 October 2006 and the name of the joint venture was announced on 3 September 2007. The European Commission cleared the joint venture in October 2007 on the grounds that the activities of Areva and MHI were geographically complementary and Atmea was unlikely to strengthen the competitiveness of each parent company.

The completion of the French nuclear industry reorganisation under EDF leadership in 2018 also led to a renewed partnership within ATMEA. ATMEA was initially formed as a joint venture between AREVA NP and MHI to develop the next-generation AT-MEA1 reactor. Under the new structure, there was a fifty-fifty ownership of ATMEA between EDF and MHI, along with a special share owned by Framatome. This would reinforce the Franco/Japanese new nuclear power offering to many countries recognizing the key role of nuclear energy in the transition towards low-carbon power generation.

The joint development was abandoned in 2019, following the similar fate of the French-Japanese ASTRID fast reactor design the same year.

== The ATMEA1 reactor ==
The ATMEA1 reactor design was an about 1200 MWe generation III+ pressurized water reactor with three coolant loops and a thermal power level of 3,150 MWth. The design has high thermal efficiency (typically 10% higher than currently operating reactors), a 60-year service life and a load-following capability. The reactor can be set to a 12- to 24 month operational cycle.

The ATMEA1 reactor's systems and components were previously developed by AREVA and MHI for the EPR and APWR respectively, including steam generators with axial economizer and TT690 tubes, advanced accumulators and reactor internals with Heavy Neutron Reflector.

The ATMEA1 safety features include three redundant trains of emergency core cooling systems and a core-melt retention system.

With a power output of about 1200 Mwe, the ATMEA1, was targeted to attract new-entry countries looking to develop nuclear power. In comparison, Mitsubishi's APWR was slated to have a power of 1700 MWe while Areva's European Pressurized Reactor has an output of 1600 Mwe.

== Compliance ==
In 2013, the Canadian Nuclear Safety Commission (CNSC) released a pre-project design review of the ATMEA1 reactor and found the design compliant with CNSC regulatory requirements and expectations for new nuclear power plants in Canada.

In 2012 the French Nuclear Safety Authority, (Autorité de sûreté nucléaire or ASN), released a report finding the safety options and design choice of the ATMEA1 satisfactory and in compliance with French regulations.

On 7 July 2008 the International Atomic Energy Agency (IAEA) completed the review of the conceptual safety design features for the ATMEA1. The report concluded that the ATMEA1 conceptual design addresses the IAEA's fundamental safety principles and key design and safety assessment requirements.

== Planned construction ==
On 3 May 2013, Turkish prime minister Recep Tayyip Erdoğan and his Japanese counterpart Shinzo Abe, signed an outline US$22 billion deal for the construction of the Sinop Nuclear Power Plant in Turkey. Plans for the 4400 MWe plant were ratified by Turkey's government in April 2015. Ownership of the plant would be split between a consortium of Japan's Mitsubishi Heavy Industries (MHI) and Itochu, and France's Areva and GDF Suez with 51%, and Turkey's state-run power producer EUAS with 49%. The plant would comprise four ATMEA1 reactors. As of 2015, subject to final agreement, construction was planned to begin in 2017, with the first unit to be in operation by 2023.

In 2018 an Environmental Impact Assessment application was submitted to the Environment and Urban Planning Ministry. Location and construction licenses were still to be obtained from the Turkey Atomic Energy Agency.

In April 2018, Nikkei reported that Itochu would withdraw from the project, while MHI and other investors were continuing the feasibility study through the summer of 2018. The remaining members of the Japanese consortium abandoned the project in December 2018 after a failure to reach agreement with the Turkish government on financing terms. Construction costs had almost doubled to about $44 billion, because of post-Fukushima safety improvements and the fall in the value of the Turkish lira.

== See also ==
- Nuclear power in Japan
- Nuclear power in France
