= Taishan Nuclear Power Plant =

Nuclear power plant in Guangdong, China

Taishan Nuclear Power Plant 台山核电站
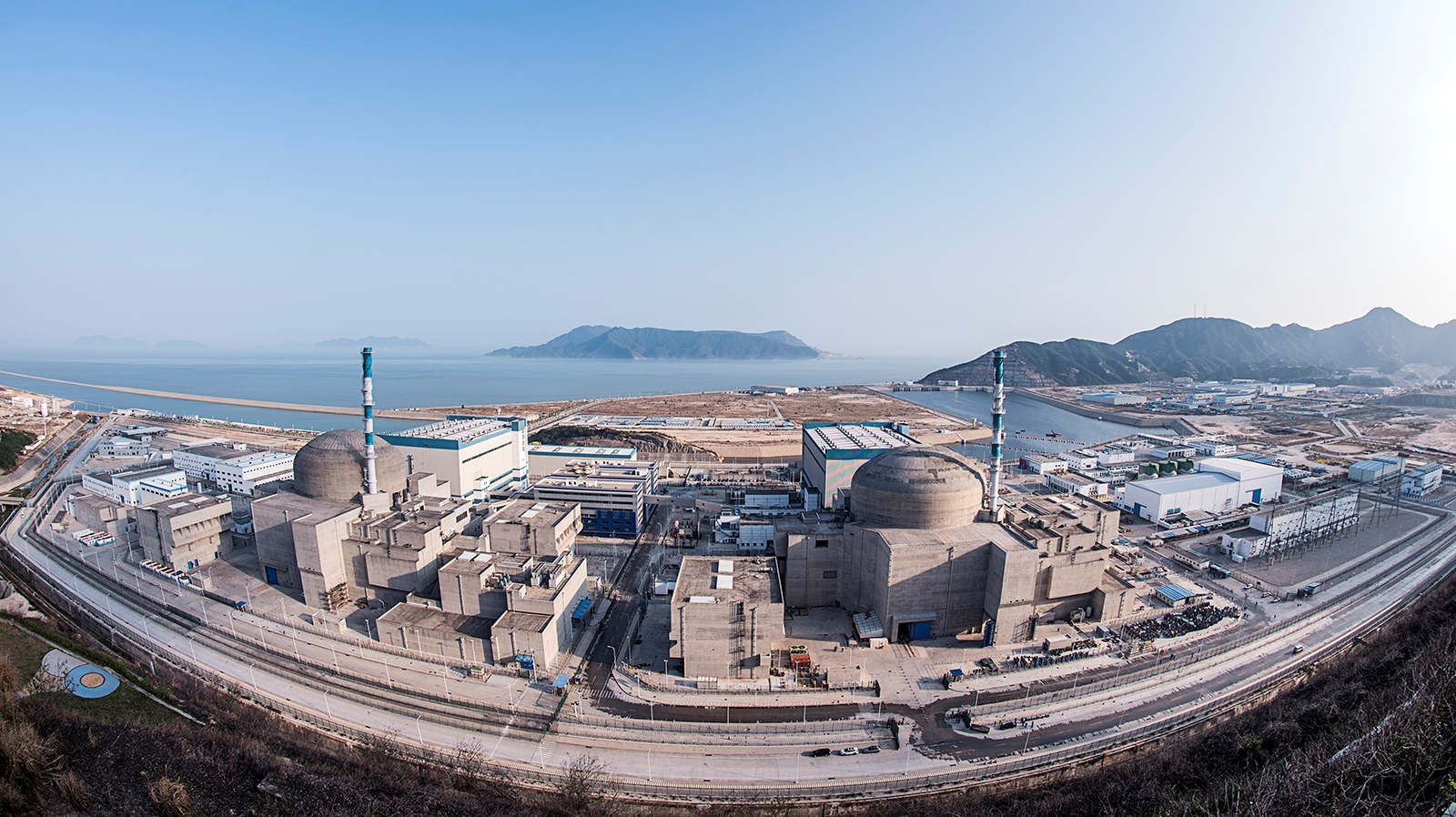
- Taishan Units 1 & 2
- Country: China
- Location: Taishan, Guangdong
- Coordinates: 21°55′4″N 112°58′55″E
- Status: Operational
- Construction began: Unit 1: November 18, 2009; Unit 2: April 15, 2010
- Commission date: Unit 1: June 29, 2018; Unit 2: June 23, 2019
- Construction cost: 50.2 billion yuan (US$7.5 billion)
Owner
CGNPC	(70%)
EDF	(30%)
- Operator: Taishan Nuclear Power Joint Venture Company Limited

Nuclear power station
- Reactors: 2
- Reactor type: PWR - EPR-1750
- Reactor supplier: Framatome (part of Areva, 2006-2018)
- Cooling source: Yaogu Bay
- Thermal capacity: 2 × 4590 MW_{th}

Power generation
- Units operational: 2 × 1660 MW_{e} (net)
- Nameplate capacity: 3,320 MW_{e}
- Capacity factor: 2021: Unit 1: 52.4%; Unit 2: 74.8%; Lifetime: Unit 1: 66.3%; Unit 2: 81.8%
- Annual net output: 22,769.94 GWh (81,971.8 TJ) (2024)

External links
- Commons: Related media on Commons

The Taishan Nuclear Power Plant (Chinese: 台山核电站; pinyin: Táishān Hédiànzhàn) is a nuclear power plant in Taishan, Guangdong province, China. The plant features two operational EPR reactors. The first unit, Taishan 1, entered commercial service in December 2018, but was shut down from July 2021 to August 2022 to investigate and fix issues with fuel rod cladding. The second unit, Taishan 2, entered commercial service in September 2019. Delays at other EPR construction sites in Finland and France meant that Taishan was the first nuclear power plant to have an operational EPR.

The project is owned by Guangdong Taishan Nuclear Power Joint Venture Company Limited (TNPC), which is 70% owned by China Guangdong Nuclear Power Group (CGNPC) and 30% by Électricité de France (EDF).

The plant's twin reactors each have a nameplate capacity of 1750 MWe. Its Arabelle generators are the largest single-piece electrical generators in the world, each weighing 495 tonnes and built by Dongfang Electric. Of the 3500 MWe gross delivered, around 180 MWe will be used by plant systems. Most of this is used to power the pumps that feed water into the steam generators. The pair of reactors can deliver 3320 MWe net for supply to the grid, making these the most powerful reactors in the world.

== History ==
=== Construction ===
Excavation work began on 26 August 2008. The first concrete for the first unit was poured in October 2009. Construction of each unit was planned to take 46 months, significantly faster and cheaper than the first two EPRs in Finland and France. These plans proved elusive as start up was repeatedly delayed. In February 2017, after 88 months of construction, CGNPC announced that completion of the reactors would be delayed until the second half of 2017 and the first half of 2018.

Areva (more specifically its subsidiary Framatome, which is now independent) was contracted to develop the nuclear island (including reactor) and supply fuel for 15 years, as well as providing technology transfer and engineering services.

In December 2017, Hong Kong media reported that a "boiler" had cracked during testing, and that welding on the component was considered "problematic". Neither the nuclear plant's operators nor the manufacturer of the affected component responded to the news agency's request for comment. Later clarification revealed that the "boiler" was a deaerator vessel, which removes dissolved oxygen from water by heating it.

In January 2018 commissioning was rescheduled, with commercial operation expected in late 2018 and 2019. This was the third delay in two years, involving a further deferral of 5 billion yuan (US$770 million). It was estimated that the plant's investment cost would rise to between 22 and 23 yuan per watt from an originally budgeted 14 yuan.

On 9 April 2018, the Official Letter of Approving the Initial Fuel Loading of the first unit of the Taishan Nuclear Power Plant was issued by the National Nuclear Safety Administration (NNSA). Taishan Unit 1 began fuel loading at 18:18 on 10 April, marking the beginning of fuel loading of the first reactor using the third-generation nuclear power technology EPR.

=== Operations ===
First criticality was achieved at Taishan Unit 1 on 6 June 2018. On 29 June 2018, Taishan 1 was connected to the grid. It became the first EPR to enter commercial operation on 13 December 2018.

On 2 March 2021, the Chinese NNSA reported that a INES level 0 event (defined as a deviation from normal operation with no safety significance) occurred on 21 February, which triggered an automatic emergency shutdown (a SCRAM) of Unit 1. Post-incident investigation revealed the cause of the SCRAM to be a technician accidentally shorting a circuit during an onsite investigation of a slight under-voltage of a 10kV power supply. To prevent this accident from occurring in the future, all nuclear power plants were ordered to revise operating procedures to improve reliability and maintainability of similar power supplies.

On 11 April 2021, the Chinese NNSA reported that another level 0 incident occurred on 5 April, resulting in the unexpected release of radioactive gas into the atmosphere. Post-accident investigation calculated the amount of radioactive release to contribute to 0.00044% of annual limit, well within safety parameters. Further details provided by Framatome revealed that the issue was build-up of xenon and krypton inert fission gases in the primary circuit of Taishan 1, potentially from a leak in a fuel rod housing. The build-up was described as "known phenomenon" which is well covered in the plant's operating and safety procedures.

On 30 July 2021, the plant operator (CGNPC) reported that they have shutdown Taishan Unit 1 for maintenance after lengthy talks with relevant technicians. Engineers would find the cause of the damage and replace the affected fuel rods. On 16 August 2022, Taishan Unit 1 completed maintenance and was connected to the grid on 15 August 2022.

== Reactor data ==
The Taishan Nuclear Power Plant Phase I consists of two reactors: both reactors are in commercial operation. Its Phase II consists of adding two additional reactors.

Unit	Type	Model	Net power (MW_{e})	Gross power (MW_{e})	Thermal power (MW_{th})	Construction start	First criticality	Grid connection	Commercial operation	Notes
Phase I
Taishan 1	PWR	EPR	1660	1750	4590	November 18, 2009	June 6, 2018	June 29, 2018	December 13, 2018	
Taishan 2	PWR	EPR	1660	1750	4590	April 15, 2010	May 28, 2019	June 25, 2019	September 7, 2019	
Taishan 3	PWR	Hualong One	1000 MW	1200 MW	3150 MW					
Taishan 4	PWR	Hualong One	1000 MW	1200 MW	3150 MW					

== See also ==
- Nuclear power in China
- List of commercial nuclear reactors § China
