= Chooz =

Chooz (French: [ʃo]) can denote several things:

- Chooz, Ardennes is a French commune
  - The Chooz Nuclear Power Plant
  - Chooz (experiment) was a physics experiment using the reactor as a neutrino source
  - Double Chooz is a successor experiment, currently ongoing
