= N4 (nuclear reactor) =

French nuclear reactor type

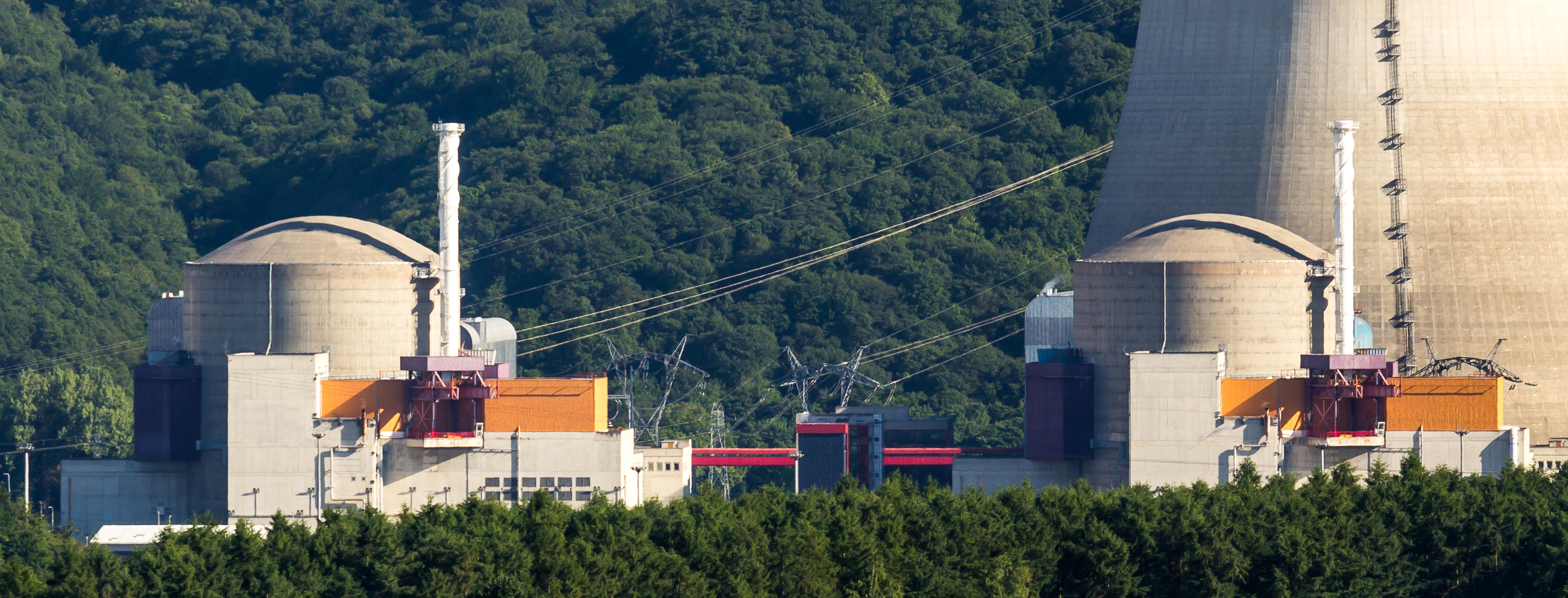
The Chooz Nuclear Power Plant is home to two N4 reactors.

The N4 reactor type is a generation II pressurized water reactor designed and built by Framatome.

== Design specifications ==
Animated diagram of a pressurized water reactor.

The reactor houses 205 fuel assemblies each made out of 264 fuel rods. The rods are filled with low enriched uranium oxide (UO_{2}) pellets for a total mass of 110 tonnes. The reactor core has a diameter of 3.48 meters and a height of 4.27 meters. The pressure vessel has a height of 13.65 meters, a diameter of 4.65 meters and a thickness of 230 millimeters. The primary circuit has four loops and is pressurized at 155 bar. For safety reasons, the four steam generators are placed inside the containment building. The produced steam is directed towards a 1500 MW Alstom Arabelle turbine at a pressure of 71 bar and a temperature of 268.8 °C.

The name "N4" stands for "Nouveau 4 boucles primaires", French for "New 4 primary loops". At 1500 MW_{e}, it is still the most powerful tier of operational reactors in France, but the new generation III EPR design of the Flamanville 3 reactor should surpass it once commercial operation begins.

== List of operational N4 reactors ==
Only four reactors of this type are currently operating in the world : two at the Civaux Nuclear Power Plant and two at the Chooz Nuclear Power Plant. Both plants are operated by French electric utility company EDF.

Power Plant	Net electric power (MW_{e})	Thermal capacity (MW_{t})	Construction began	First Criticality Date	Commercial operation
Chooz-B1	1500	4270	01 Jan, 1984	25 Jul, 1996	15 May, 2000
Chooz-B2	1500	4270	31 Dec, 1985	10 Mar, 1997	29 Sep, 2000
Civaux-1	1495	4270	15 Oct, 1988	29 Nov, 1997	29 Jan, 2002
Civaux-2	1495	4270	01 Apr, 1991	27 Nov, 1999	23 Apr, 2002

== See also ==
- Pressurized water reactor
- Nuclear power in France
- Framatome
