= 1998 FIFA World Cup seeding =

Calculation of football teams before tournament

For the seeding of qualified teams at the 1998 FIFA World Cup, FIFA used the FIFA World Rankings in combination with performances of national teams in the three previous FIFA World Cups.

For the FIFA World Ranking part, points were allocated on the basis of 32 points for the highest ranked team of the 32 qualified teams at the end of each preceding three years, down to 1 point for the lowest ranked team.

For the World Cup performance part, points were allocated as follows:

- Teams qualified for the knockout stages were ranked by their overall performance and received between 32 points (World Cup winner) and 17 points (the losing team in the Round of 16 with the worst overall performance).
- Teams eliminated in the group stage were ranked by their performance. The top half received 9 points, the rest 8 points.

The seedings table calculated a sum of points scored by each national team from the 1986 FIFA World Cup, 1990 FIFA World Cup and the 1994 FIFA World Cup averaged in a 1:2:3 ratio respectively, that finally got multiplied by a 1.2 weighting factor to account for 60% of the total sum of points. The seedings table also calculated a sum of points scored by each national team from the FIFA World Rankings at the three given dates December 1995, December 1996 and November 1997, averaged in a 1:1:1 ratio and finally multiplied by a 0.8 weighting factor to account for 40% of the total sum of points. The total points were finally the sum of these two calculated totals.

Seed	Country	1. FIFA World Cup Finals							2. FIFA World Rankings							Total points (1+2)
Seed	Country	A: Mexico 1986 (16.7%)		B: Italy 1990 (33.3%)		C: USA 1994 (50%)		Weighted avg. points 1.2*(1/6A+1/3B+1/2C)	A: Dec 1995 (33.3%)		B: Dec 1996 (33.3%)		C: Nov 1997 (33.3%)		Weighted avg. points 0.8*(1/3A+1/3B+1/3C)	Total points (1+2)
Seed	Country	Rk	Pt.	Rk	Pt.	Rk	Pt.	Weighted avg. points 1.2*(1/6A+1/3B+1/2C)	Rk	Pt.	Rk	Pt.	Rk	Pt.	Weighted avg. points 0.8*(1/3A+1/3B+1/3C)	Total points (1+2)
1	Germany	2	31	1	32	5	28	35.80	2	31	2	31	2	31	24.80	60.60
2	Brazil	5	28	9	24	1	32	34.40	1	32	1	32	1	32	25.60	60.00
3	Italy	12	21	3	30	2	31	34.80	3	30	10	25	10	24	21.07	55.87
4	Spain	7	26	10	23	8	25	29.40	4	29	8	27	3	30	22.93	52.33
5	Argentina	1	32	2	31	10	23	32.60	7	27	22	16	19	17	16.00	48.60
6	Romania	-	0	12	21	6	27	24.60	11	23	16	20	5	29	19.20	43.80
7	Netherlands	-	0	15	18	7	26	22.80	6	28	9	26	12	22	20.27	43.07
8	Mexico	6	27	-	0	13	20	17.40	12	22	11	24	11	23	18.40	35.80
9	Bulgaria	15	18	-	0	4	29	21.00	17	20	15	21	24	13	14.40	35.40
10	England	8	25	4	29	-	0	16.60	21	18	12	23	6	28	18.40	35.00
11	Belgium	4	29	11	22	11	22	27.80	24	16	42	6	41	4	6.93	34.73
12	Colombia	-	0	14	19	19	9	13.00	15	21	4	29	9	25	20.00	33.00
13	France	3	30	-	0	-	0	6.00	8	26	3	30	7	27	22.13	28.13
14	United States	-	0	23	8	14	19	14.60	19	19	18	19	29	11	13.07	27.67
15	Denmark	9	24	-	0	-	0	4.80	9	25	6	28	8	26	21.07	25.87
16	Norway	-	0	-	0	17	9	5.40	10	24	14	22	14	21	17.87	23.27
17	Morocco	11	22	-	0	23	8	9.20	38	10	27	12	16	20	11.20	20.40
18	Cameroon	-	0	7	26	22	8	15.20	37	11	56	3	51	2	4.27	19.47
19	Nigeria	-	0	-	0	9	24	14.40	27	14	63	2	71	1	4.53	18.93
20	Saudi Arabia	-	0	-	0	12	21	12.60	54	5	37	8	34	8	5.60	18.20
21	FR Yugoslavia	-	0	5	28	-	0	11.20	68	2	55	4	22	15	5.60	16.80
22	South Korea	20	9	22	8	20	9	10.40	46	6	44	5	31	9	5.33	15.73
23	Scotland	19	9	20	9	-	0	5.40	26	15	29	11	36	6	8.53	13.93
24	Japan	-	0	-	0	-	0	0.00	31	13	21	17	18	18	12.80	12.80
25	Tunisia	-	0	-	0	-	0	0.00	22	17	23	15	23	14	12.27	12.27
26	Chile	-	0	-	0	-	0	0.00	36	12	26	13	17	19	11.73	11.73
27	Austria	-	0	18	9	-	0	3.60	39	9	34	9	26	12	8.00	11.60
28	Croatia	-	0	-	0	-	0	0.00	41	7	24	14	21	16	9.87	9.87
29	Paraguay	13	20	-	0	-	0	4.00	64	3	38	7	30	10	5.33	9.33
30	South Africa	-	0	-	0	-	0	0.00	40	8	19	18	35	7	8.80	8.80
31	Jamaica	-	0	-	0	-	0	0.00	56	4	32	10	39	5	5.07	5.07
32	Iran	-	0	-	0	-	0	0.00	108	1	83	1	50	3	1.33	1.33
Seed	Country	Rk	Pt.	Rk	Pt.	Rk	Pt.	Weighted avg. points 1.2*(1/6A+1/3B+1/2C)	Rk	Pt.	Rk	Pt.	Rk	Pt.	Weighted avg. points 0.8*(1/3A+1/3B+1/3C)	Total points (1+2)
Seed	Country	A: Mexico 1986 (16.7%)		B: Italy 1990 (33.3%)		C: USA 1994 (50%)		Weighted avg. points 1.2*(1/6A+1/3B+1/2C)	A: Dec 1995 (33.3%)		B: Dec 1996 (33.3%)		C: Nov 1997 (33.3%)		Weighted avg. points 0.8*(1/3A+1/3B+1/3C)	Total points (1+2)
Seed	Country	1. FIFA World Cup Finals							2. FIFA World Rankings							Total points (1+2)

France were seeded as hosts, Brazil as defending champions. The other seeds were: Germany, Italy, Spain, Argentina, Romania, and the Netherlands.

== Broadcasting ==
The 1998 FIFA World Cup seeding are broadcast live on TF1, France Television and Canal+ in France.
