= 1998 FIFA World Cup =

Association football tournament in France

Coupe du Monde – France 98 (French)

Tournament details
- Host country: France
- Dates: 10 June – 12 July
- Teams: 32 (from 5 confederations)
- Venues: 10 (in 10 host cities)

Final positions
- Champions: France (1st title)
- Runners-up: Brazil
- Third place: Croatia
- Fourth place: Netherlands

Tournament statistics
- Matches played: 64
- Goals scored: 171 (2.67 per match)
- Attendance: 2,785,100 (43,517 per match)
- Top scorer: (Croatia) Davor Šuker (6 goals)
- Best player: (Brazil) Ronaldo
- Best young player: (England) Michael Owen
- Best goalkeeper: (France) Fabien Barthez
- Fair play award: England; France

The 1998 FIFA World Cup was the 16th FIFA World Cup, the football world championship for men's national teams. The finals tournament was held in France from 10 June to 12 July 1998. The country was chosen as the host nation by FIFA for the second time in the history of the tournament (the first was in 1938), defeating Morocco in the bidding process. It was the ninth time that it was held in Europe. Spanning 32 days, it was the longest World Cup tournament ever held and with the most teams (32 teams in the competition finals) until 2026, when the World Cup was expanded to 48 teams.

Qualification for the finals began in March 1996 and concluded in November 1997. For the first time in the competition, the group stage was expanded from 24 teams to 32, with eight groups of four. 64 matches were played in 10 stadiums in 10 host cities, with the opening match and final staged at the newly built Stade de France in the Parisian suburb of Saint-Denis.

The tournament was won by host country France, who beat defending champions Brazil 3–0 in the final to win their first title. In doing so France became the seventh nation to win the World Cup, and the sixth (after Uruguay, Italy, England, West Germany and Argentina) to win the World Cup on home soil. Through 2026, France remains the most recent team to win the tournament on home soil. Croatia, Jamaica, Japan and South Africa made their first appearances in the tournament.

== Host selection ==
France was awarded the 1998 World Cup on 2 July 1992 by the executive committee of FIFA during a general meeting in Zürich, Switzerland. They defeated Morocco by 12 votes to 7. Switzerland withdrew, due to being unable to meet FIFA's requirements. This made France the third country to host two World Cups, after Mexico and Italy in 1986 and 1990 respectively. France previously hosted the third edition of the World Cup in 1938. England, who hosted the competition in 1966, were among the original applicants, but later withdrew their application in favour of an ultimately successful bid to host UEFA Euro 1996.

Voting results
Country	Round 1
France	12
Morocco	7

=== Bribery and corruption investigations ===
On 4 June 2015, while co-operating with the FBI and the Swiss authorities, Chuck Blazer confirmed that he and other members of FIFA's executive committee were bribed during the 1998 and 2010 World Cups host selection process. Blazer stated that "we facilitated bribes in conjunction with the selection of the host nation for the 1998 World Cup". Since France won the selection process it was initially thought the bribery came from its bid committee. It eventually transpired that the bribe payment was from the failed Moroccan bid.

== Qualification ==
The qualification draw for the 1998 World Cup finals took place in the Musée du Louvre, Paris on 12 December 1995. As tournament hosts, France was exempt from the draw as was defending champion Brazil, but it was also France's first World Cup since 1986. 174 teams from six confederations participated, 24 more than in the previous round. Fourteen countries qualified from the European zone (in addition to hosts France). Ten were determined after group play – nine group winners and the best second-placed team; the other eight group runners-up were drawn into pairs of four play-off matches with the winners qualifying for the finals as well. CONMEBOL (South America) and CAF (Africa) were each given five spots in the final tournament, while three spots were contested between 30 CONCACAF members in the North and Central America and the Caribbean zone. The winner of the Oceanian zone advanced to an intercontinental play-off against the runner-up of the Asian play-off, determined by the two best second-placed teams.

Four nations qualified for the first time: Croatia, Jamaica, Japan and South Africa. The last team to qualify was Iran by virtue of beating Australia in a two-legged tie on 29 November 1997. It marked their first appearance in the finals since 1978, Chile qualified for the first time since 1982, after serving a ban that saw them miss out on the two previous tournaments. Paraguay and Denmark returned for the first time since 1986. Austria, England, Scotland, and Yugoslavia returned after missing out on the 1994 tournament, with the Balkan team now appearing under the name of FR Yugoslavia.

The highest-ranked team that failed to qualify was the Czech Republic (ranked 3rd, mainly thanks to their runner-up campaign on UEFA Euro 1996), while the lowest-ranked team that did qualify was Nigeria (ranked 74th).

As of 2026, this was the last time Romania and Bulgaria qualified for the World Cup finals, the only time Jamaica have qualified and the last time Portugal failed to qualify.

=== List of qualified teams ===
The following 32 teams, shown with final pre-tournament rankings, qualified for the final tournament.

AFC (4)

- Iran (42)
- Japan (debut) (12)
- Saudi Arabia (34)
- South Korea (20)

CAF (5)

- Cameroon (49)
- Morocco (13)
- Nigeria (74)
- South Africa (debut) (24)
- Tunisia (21)

OFC (0)

- None qualified

CONCACAF (3)

- Jamaica (debut) (30)
- Mexico (4)
- United States (11)

CONMEBOL (5)

- Argentina (6)
- Brazil (holders) (1)
- Chile (9)
- Colombia (10)
- Paraguay (29)

UEFA (15)

- Austria (31)
- Belgium (36)
- Bulgaria (35)
- Croatia (debut) (19)
- Denmark (27)
- England (5)
- France (18) (hosts)
- Germany (2)
- Italy (14)
- Netherlands (25)
- Norway (7)
- Romania (22)
- Scotland (41)
- Spain (15)
- FR Yugoslavia (8)

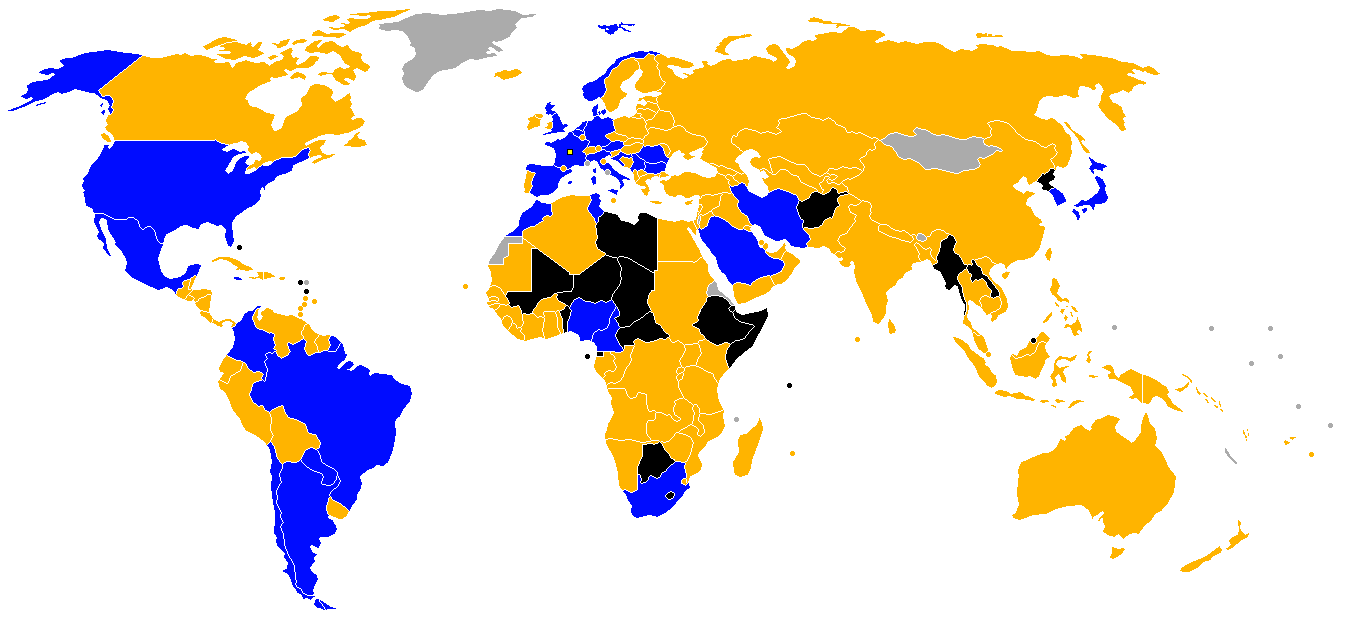
Countries qualified for World Cup Country did not qualify Countries that did not enter World Cup Country not a FIFA member

Teams listed by FIFA ranking as of May 1998
	Country	Confederation	Rank
1	Brazil (1994 winner)	CONMEBOL	1
2	Germany	UEFA	2
3	Mexico	CONCACAF	4
4	England	UEFA	5
5	Argentina	CONMEBOL	6
6	Norway	UEFA	7
7	FR Yugoslavia	UEFA	8
8	Chile	CONMEBOL	9
9	Colombia	CONMEBOL	10
10	United States	CONCACAF	11
11	Japan	AFC	12
12	Morocco	CAF	13
13	Italy	UEFA	14
14	Spain	UEFA	15
15	France (host)	UEFA	18
16	Croatia	UEFA	19
17	South Korea	AFC	20
18	Tunisia	CAF	21
19	Romania	UEFA	22
20	South Africa	CAF	24
21	Netherlands	UEFA	25
22	Denmark	UEFA	27
23	Paraguay	CONMEBOL	29
24	Jamaica	CONCACAF	30
25	Austria	UEFA	31
26	Saudi Arabia	AFC	34
27	Bulgaria	UEFA	35
28	Belgium	UEFA	36
29	Scotland	UEFA	41
30	Iran	AFC	42
31	Cameroon	CAF	49
32	Nigeria	CAF	74

== Venues ==
France's bid to host the World Cup centered on the construction of a new national stadium with 80,000 seats and nine other stadiums located across the country. When the finals were originally awarded in July 1992, none of the regional club grounds were of a capacity meeting FIFA's requirements – namely being able to safely seat 40,000. The proposed national stadium, colloquially referred to as the 'Grand stade', met with controversy at every stage of planning; the stadium's location was determined by politics, finance and national symbolism, as Mayor of Paris Jacques Chirac successfully negotiated a deal with Prime Minister Édouard Balladur to bring the Stade de France, as it was now called, to the commune of Saint-Denis just north of the capital city. Construction on the stadium started in December 1995 and was completed after 26 months of work in November 1997 at a cost of ₣2.67 billion.

The choice of stadium locations was drafted from an original list of 14 cities. FIFA and CFO monitored the progress and quality of preparations, culminating in the former providing final checks of the grounds weeks before the tournament commenced. Montpellier was the surprise inclusion from the final list of cities because of its low urban hierarchy in comparison to Strasbourg, who boasted a better hierarchy and success from its local football team, having been taken over by a consortium. Montpellier however was considered ambitious by the selecting panel to host World Cup matches. The local city and regional authorities in particular had invested heavily into football the previous two decades and were able to measure economic effects, in terms of jobs as early as in 1997. Some of the venues used for this tournament were also used for the previous World Cup in France in 1938. The Stade Vélodrome in Marseille, the Stade Municipal in Toulouse, the Parc Lescure in Bordeaux and the Parc des Princes in Paris received the honour of hosting World Cup matches once again in 1998 as they had all done in 1938; on the other hand, in addition to Strasbourg, four other cities which hosted games in 1938 were not selected: Le Havre, Lille, Reims and Antibes.

Ten stadiums were used for the tournament. In addition to nine matches being played at the Stade de France (the most used stadium in the tournament), a further six matches took place in Paris Saint-Germain's Parc des Princes, bringing the total number of matches in the Paris region to 15. France played four of their seven matches in the national stadium; they also played in the country's second and third largest cities, Marseille (hosting seven total matches) and Lyon (hosting six total matches), as well as a Round of 16 knockout match in the northern city of Lens (also hosting six total matches). Nantes, Toulouse, Bordeaux, Montpellier and Saint-Etienne also hosted six matches in total; all of the stadiums used also hosted knockout round matches.

Paris (Saint-Denis)	Marseille	Paris	Lyon
Stade de France	Stade Vélodrome	Parc des Princes	Stade de Gerland
48°55′28″N 2°21′36″E	43°16′11″N 5°23′45″E	48°50′29″N 2°15′11″E	45°43′26″N 4°49′56″E
Capacity: 80,000	Capacity: 60,000	Capacity: 48,875	Capacity: 44,000
Lens	1998 FIFA World Cup is located in France		
Stade Félix-Bollaert	1998 FIFA World Cup is located in France		
50°25′58″N 2°48′53″E	1998 FIFA World Cup is located in France		
Capacity: 41,300	1998 FIFA World Cup is located in France		
Nantes	1998 FIFA World Cup is located in France		
Stade de la Beaujoire	1998 FIFA World Cup is located in France		
47°15′20″N 1°31′31″W	1998 FIFA World Cup is located in France		
Capacity: 39,500	1998 FIFA World Cup is located in France		
Toulouse	Saint-Étienne	Bordeaux	Montpellier
Stadium de Toulouse	Stade Geoffroy-Guichard	Parc Lescure	Stade de la Mosson
43°35′0″N 1°26′3″E	45°27′39″N 4°23′24″E	44°49′45″N 0°35′52″W	43°37′20″N 3°48′43″E
Capacity: 37,000	Capacity: 36,000	Capacity: 35,200	Capacity: 34,000

== Innovations ==
=== Technologies ===
This was the first FIFA World Cup where fourth officials used electronic boards, instead of cardboard.

=== Rule changes ===
This was the first World Cup since the introduction of golden goals, banning of tackles from behind that endanger the safety of an opponent and allowance of three substitutions per game.

== Match officials ==
34 referees and 33 assistants officiated in the 1998 World Cup. As a result of the extension to 32 teams in the finals, there was an increase of 10 referees and 11 officials from the 1994 World Cup.

CAF (5)

- (Morocco) Said Belqola
- (Egypt) Gamal Al-Ghandour
- (Niger) Lucien Bouchardeau
- (Mauritius) Lim Kee Chong
- (South Africa) Ian McLeod

AFC (4)

- (Saudi Arabia) Abdul Rahman Al-Zaid
- (United Arab Emirates) Ali Bujsaim
- (Japan) Masayoshi Okada
- (Thailand) Pirom Un-Prasert

UEFA (15)

- (France) Marc Batta
- (Austria) Günter Benkö
- (Italy) Pierluigi Collina
- (Scotland) Hugh Dallas
- (England) Paul Durkin
- (Spain) José María García-Aranda
- (Germany) Bernd Heynemann
- (Russia) Nikolai Levnikov
- (Switzerland) Urs Meier
- (Portugal) Vítor Melo Pereira
- (Denmark) Kim Milton Nielsen
- (Norway) Rune Pedersen
- (Hungary) László Vágner
- (Netherlands) Mario van der Ende
- (Poland) Ryszard Wójcik

CONCACAF (3)

- (United States) Esfandiar Baharmast
- (Mexico) Arturo Brizio Carter
- (Trinidad and Tobago) Ramesh Ramdhan

OFC (1)

- (Australia) Eddie Lennie

CONMEBOL (6)

- (Argentina) Javier Castrilli
- (Paraguay) Epifanio González
- (Brazil) Márcio Rezende de Freitas
- (Chile) Mario Sánchez Yanten
- (Peru) Alberto Tejada Noriega
- (Colombia) John Toro Rendón

== Draw ==
The FIFA Organising Committee announced the eight seeded teams on 3 December 1997 at Marseille's Stade Vélodrome. The draw was conducted by at the time FIFA general secretary Joseph Blatter. Many players, both current and former, helped with the draw, such as Franz Beckenbauer, Carlos Alberto Parreira, George Weah, Julie Foudy, Raymond Kopa, Jean-Pierre Papin, Georges Carnus, and Marius Trésor.

The historic tradition to seed the hosts (France) and holders (Brazil) was upheld; while the remaining six seeds were granted for the other top 7-ranked teams, based on their results obtained in the last three FIFA World Cups (ratio 3:2:1, counting in total 60%) and their FIFA World Ranking position in the last month of the past three years (equal ratio, counting in total 40%).

For the draw, the 32 teams were allocated into four pots. The eight top-seeded teams were allocated in pot A and would be drawn/selected into the first position of the eight groups playing in the group stage. The remaining 24 unseeded teams were allocated into three pots based on geographical sections, with the nine European teams in pot B; four Asian teams and three South American teams in pot C; five African teams and three North American teams in pot D.

The general principle was to draw one team from each pot into the eight groups, although with special combined procedures for pot B and pot C, due to comprising more/less than eight teams – but sixteen teams in total. At the same time, the draw also needed to respect the geographical limitation, that each group could not feature more than one team from each confederation, except for the European teams where the limitation was maximum two per group.

Pot A Top-seeded teams (DC + Host + Top7 seeds)	Pot B Europe (UEFA)	Pot C Asia & South America (AFC & CONMEBOL)	Pot D Africa & North America (CAF & CONCACAF)
Brazil (1994 winner, group A1); France (host, group C1); Germany (1); Italy (3); Spain (4); Argentina (5); Romania (6); Netherlands (7)	Austria; Belgium; Bulgaria; Croatia; Denmark; England; Scotland; FR Yugoslavia; Norway	Chile; Colombia; Iran; Japan; Paraguay; Saudi Arabia; South Korea	Cameroon; Jamaica; Mexico; Morocco; Nigeria; South Africa; Tunisia; United States

- The draw took place at Stade Vélodrome in Marseille, and was televised live on 4 December 1997: FIFA World Cup Draw on BBC Sport.

For the first time in history, the draw event took place in a football stadium, with 38,000 spectators and an estimated 1 billion TV viewers. The draw was officiated by FIFA secretary general Sepp Blatter. Teams were drawn by football legends Franz Beckenbauer, Carlos Alberto Parreira, George Weah and Raymond Kopa.

Organiser Michel Platini, who later became president of UEFA, admitted in 2018 that the draw for the group stage of the competition had been fixed so that France and Brazil were kept apart until the final, telling France Bleu Sport: "We did a bit of trickery. When we were organising the schedule. We did not spend six years organising the World Cup to not do some little shenanigans".

The statement from Platini referred to the fact that, shortly before the World Cup finals draw took place, the FIFA Organising Committee had met to finalise the draw process. At this meeting, the committee had approved the proposal to assign host nation France to group position C1 and defending champions Brazil to group position A1 ahead of the draw. As the tournament structure was also predetermined so that the winners of Groups A, D, E and H, and the runners-up of Groups B, C, F and G would be kept apart from the group winners of B, C, F and G, and the runners-up of Group A, D, E and H until the final; thus, France and Brazil could avoid meeting each other until the final if both teams finished in the same position in the top two of their respective groups.

Procedure for the draw:

1. Pot A was used to draw the remaining six top-seeded teams for the first position of groups B, D, E, F, G and H.
2. Pot D was used to draw one team to each of the eight groups (drawing in the alphabetic order from A to H).
3. Pot B was used to draw one team to each of the eight groups (drawing in the alphabetic order from A to H).
4. As per the FIFA rule of only allowing a maximum of two UEFA teams in each group, the remaining ninth team from Pot B, was subject to a second draw, to be put in either of the groups containing a top-seeded South American (CONMEBOL) team.
5. Pot C was used to draw one team to each of the seven groups with an empty spot (drawing in alphabetical order from A to H). However, as each group could only contain one South American (CONMEBOL) team, the first Asian (AFC) team drawn would not be drawn into a group in alphabetical order, but instead be drawn into the remaining open group with a top-seeded South American (CONMEBOL) team.
6. To decide the match schedules, the exact group position number for the un-seeded teams in each group (2, 3 or 4), were also drawn immediately from eight special group bowls, after each respective team had been drawn from pot D, B and C.

=== Draw results and group fixtures ===
The draw resulted in the following eight groups:

Group A
Pos	Team
A1	Brazil
A2	Scotland
A3	Morocco
A4	Norway

Group B
Pos	Team
B1	Italy
B2	Chile
B3	Cameroon
B4	Austria

Group C
Pos	Team
C1	France
C2	South Africa
C3	Saudi Arabia
C4	Denmark

Group D
Pos	Team
D1	Spain
D2	Nigeria
D3	Paraguay
D4	Bulgaria

Group E
Pos	Team
E1	Netherlands
E2	Belgium
E3	South Korea
E4	Mexico

Group F
Pos	Team
F1	Germany
F2	United States
F3	FR Yugoslavia
F4	Iran

Group G
Pos	Team
G1	Romania
G2	Colombia
G3	England
G4	Tunisia

Group H
Pos	Team
H1	Argentina
H2	Japan
H3	Jamaica
H4	Croatia

In each group, the teams played three matches, one against each of the other teams. Three points were awarded for each win, while a draw was worth one point. After completion of the group stage, the two teams with the most points in each group would advance to the knockout stage, with each group winner facing the runner-up from one of the other groups in the round of 16. This was a new format for the World Cup, following the expansion from 24 teams in 1994. A total of 64 games were played, including the final and a match for third place between the losers of the two semi-finals.

The fixtures for the group stage were decided based on the draw results, as follows:

Group stage schedule
Matchday	Dates	Matches
Matchday 1	10–15 June 1998	1 v 2, 3 v 4
Matchday 2	16–22 June 1998	1 v 3, 2 v 4
Matchday 3	23–26 June 1998	4 v 1, 2 v 3

== Squads ==
As with the preceding tournament, each team's squad for the 1998 World Cup finals consisted of 22 players. Each participating national association had to confirm their final 22-player squad by 1 June 1998.

Out of the 704 players participating in the 1998 World Cup, 447 were signed up with a European club; 90 in Asia, 67 in South America, 61 in Northern and Central America and 37 in Africa. 75 played their club football in England – five more than Italy and Spain. Barcelona of Spain was the club contributing to the most players in the tournament with 13 players on their side.

The average age of all teams was 27 years, 8 months – five months older than the previous tournament. Samuel Eto'o of Cameroon was the youngest player selected in the competition at 17 years, 3 months, while the oldest was Jim Leighton of Scotland at 39 years, 11 months.

== Group stage ==
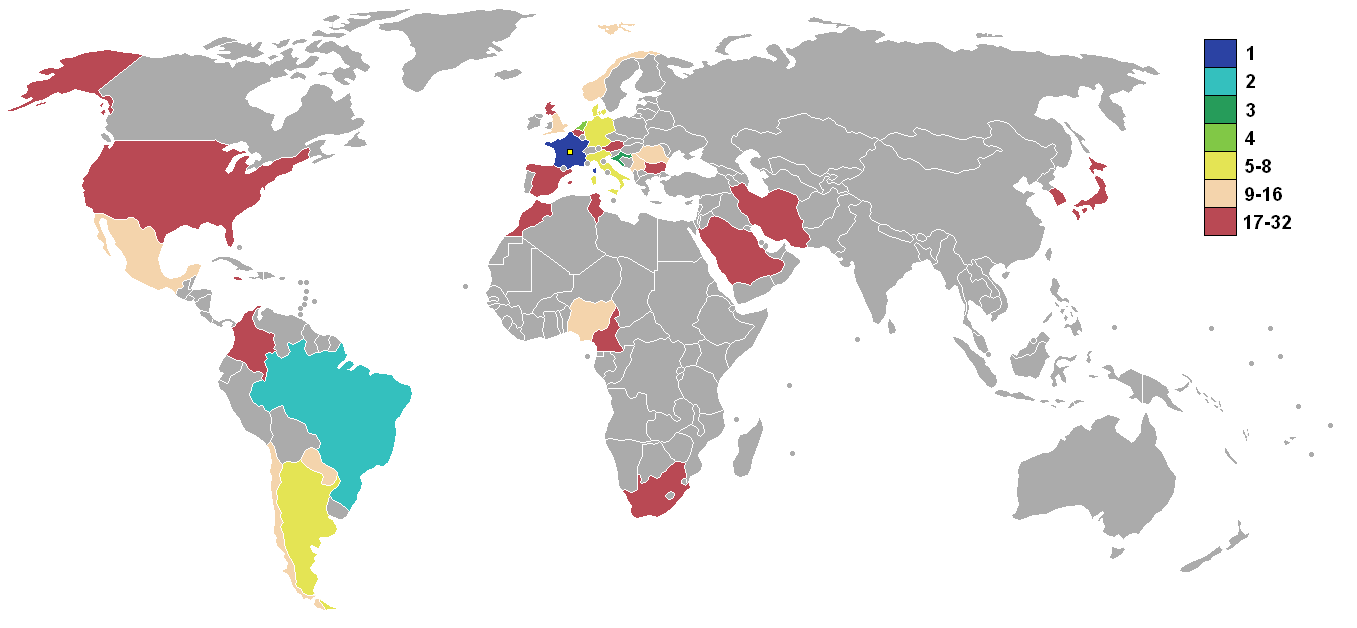
Champion Runner-up Third place Fourth place Quarter-finals Round of 16 Group stage

All times are Central European Summer Time (UTC+2)

Key for tables
- Pld = total games played
- W = total games won
- D = total games drawn (tied)
- L = total games lost
- GF = total goals scored (goals for)
- GA = total goals conceded (goals against)
- GD = goal difference (GF−GA)
- Pts = total points accumulated

=== Group A ===
Defending champions Brazil won Group A after only two matches as the nation achieved victories over Scotland (2–1) and Morocco (3–0). Heading into the third game, Brazil had nothing to play for but still started its regulars against Norway, who was looking to upset Brazil once again. Needing a victory, Norway overturned a 1–0 deficit with 7 minutes remaining to defeat Brazil 2–1, with Kjetil Rekdal scoring the winning penalty to send Norway into the knockout stage for the first time.

Norway's victory denied Morocco a chance at the Round of 16, despite winning 3–0 against Scotland. It was only Morocco's second ever victory at a World Cup, having recorded its first previous win 12 years earlier on 11 June 1986.

Scotland managed only one point, coming in a 1–1 draw against Norway, and failed to get out of the first round for an eighth time in the FIFA World Cup.

Pos	Team	Pld	W	D	L	GF	GA	GD	Pts	Qualification
1	Brazil	3	2	0	1	6	3	+3	6	Advance to knockout stage
2	Norway	3	1	2	0	5	4	+1	5	Advance to knockout stage
3	Morocco	3	1	1	1	5	5	0	4	
4	Scotland	3	0	1	2	2	6	−4	1	

Source: FIFA

10 June 1998
Brazil	2–1	Scotland	Stade de France, Saint-Denis
Morocco	2–2	Norway	Stade de la Mosson, Montpellier
16 June 1998
Scotland	1–1	Norway	Parc Lescure, Bordeaux
Brazil	3–0	Morocco	Stade de la Beaujoire, Nantes
23 June 1998
Scotland	0–3	Morocco	Stade Geoffroy-Guichard, Saint-Étienne
Brazil	1–2	Norway	Stade Vélodrome, Marseille

=== Group B ===
Italy and Chile progressed to the second round, while Austria failed to win for the first time since 1958 and Cameroon failed to get out of the group stage for the second time in a row. Italy were the only team in the group to win a match, defeating both Austria and Cameroon, who drew with each other: Chile drew all three of their matches, and thus finished ahead of the other two by virtue of having been the only team to take a point off Italy.

Pos	Team	Pld	W	D	L	GF	GA	GD	Pts	Qualification
1	Italy	3	2	1	0	7	3	+4	7	Advance to knockout stage
2	Chile	3	0	3	0	4	4	0	3	Advance to knockout stage
3	Austria	3	0	2	1	3	4	−1	2	
4	Cameroon	3	0	2	1	2	5	−3	2	

Source: FIFA

11 June 1998
Italy	2–2	Chile	Parc Lescure, Bordeaux
Cameroon	1–1	Austria	Stade de Toulouse, Toulouse
17 June 1998
Chile	1–1	Austria	Stade Geoffroy-Guichard, Saint-Étienne
Italy	3–0	Cameroon	Stade de la Mosson, Montpellier
23 June 1998
Italy	2–1	Austria	Stade de France, Saint-Denis
Chile	1–1	Cameroon	Stade de la Beaujoire, Nantes

=== Group C ===
France, the host nation, swept Group C when the start of their path to their first FIFA World Cup trophy culminated with their 2–1 win over Denmark, who despite their loss, progressed to the second round. Saudi Arabia, after a good performance four years earlier, finished bottom with only one point. Debutant South Africa grabbed two points and also exited at the group stage.

Pos	Team	Pld	W	D	L	GF	GA	GD	Pts	Qualification
1	France (H)	3	3	0	0	9	1	+8	9	Advance to knockout stage
2	Denmark	3	1	1	1	3	3	0	4	Advance to knockout stage
3	South Africa	3	0	2	1	3	6	−3	2	
4	Saudi Arabia	3	0	1	2	2	7	−5	1	

Source: FIFA
(H) Hosts

12 June 1998
Saudi Arabia	0–1	Denmark	Stade Félix-Bollaert, Lens
France	3–0	South Africa	Stade Vélodrome, Marseille
18 June 1998
South Africa	1–1	Denmark	Stade de Toulouse, Toulouse
France	4–0	Saudi Arabia	Stade de France, Saint-Denis
24 June 1998
France	2–1	Denmark	Stade de Gerland, Lyon
South Africa	2–2	Saudi Arabia	Parc Lescure, Bordeaux

=== Group D ===
Nigeria and Paraguay advanced to the Round of 16. Nigeria scored a surprise victory over top seed Spain, while Paraguay drew with them, and Bulgaria failed to repeat their surprise performance from the previous tournament. With Nigeria already guaranteed qualification with 6 points, Paraguay defeated them to secure their second-place in the group ahead of Spain.

Pos	Team	Pld	W	D	L	GF	GA	GD	Pts	Qualification
1	Nigeria	3	2	0	1	5	5	0	6	Advance to knockout stage
2	Paraguay	3	1	2	0	3	1	+2	5	Advance to knockout stage
3	Spain	3	1	1	1	8	4	+4	4	
4	Bulgaria	3	0	1	2	1	7	−6	1	

Source: FIFA

12 June 1998
Paraguay	0–0	Bulgaria	Stade de la Mosson, Montpellier
13 June 1998
Spain	2–3	Nigeria	Stade de la Beaujoire, Nantes
19 June 1998
Nigeria	1–0	Bulgaria	Parc des Princes, Paris
Spain	0–0	Paraguay	Stade Geoffroy-Guichard, Saint-Étienne
24 June 1998
Nigeria	1–3	Paraguay	Stade de Toulouse, Toulouse
Spain	6–1	Bulgaria	Stade Félix-Bollaert, Lens

=== Group E ===
The Netherlands and Mexico advanced with the same record, with the former placing first on goal difference. Belgium and eventual 2002 FIFA World Cup co-hosts South Korea failed to advance, although Belgium were undefeated with three draws.

Pos	Team	Pld	W	D	L	GF	GA	GD	Pts	Qualification
1	Netherlands	3	1	2	0	7	2	+5	5	Advance to knockout stage
2	Mexico	3	1	2	0	7	5	+2	5	Advance to knockout stage
3	Belgium	3	0	3	0	3	3	0	3	
4	South Korea	3	0	1	2	2	9	−7	1	

Source: FIFA

13 June 1998
South Korea	1–3	Mexico	Stade de Gerland, Lyon
Netherlands	0–0	Belgium	Stade de France, Saint-Denis
20 June 1998
Belgium	2–2	Mexico	Parc Lescure, Bordeaux
Netherlands	5–0	South Korea	Stade Vélodrome, Marseille
25 June 1998
Netherlands	2–2	Mexico	Stade Geoffroy-Guichard, Saint-Étienne
Belgium	1–1	South Korea	Parc des Princes, Paris

=== Group F ===
Germany and the Federal Republic of Yugoslavia advanced, each with 7 points (Germany took 1st on goal difference). Iran and 1994 host United States failed to advance.

Pos	Team	Pld	W	D	L	GF	GA	GD	Pts	Qualification
1	Germany	3	2	1	0	6	2	+4	7	Advance to knockout stage
2	FR Yugoslavia	3	2	1	0	4	2	+2	7	Advance to knockout stage
3	Iran	3	1	0	2	2	4	−2	3	
4	United States	3	0	0	3	1	5	−4	0	

Source: FIFA

14 June 1998
FR Yugoslavia	1–0	Iran	Stade Geoffroy-Guichard, Saint-Étienne
15 June 1998
Germany	2–0	United States	Parc des Princes, Paris
21 June 1998
Germany	2–2	FR Yugoslavia	Stade Félix-Bollaert, Lens
United States	1–2	Iran	Stade de Gerland, Lyon
25 June 1998
Germany	2–0	Iran	Stade de la Mosson, Montpellier
United States	0–1	FR Yugoslavia	Stade de la Beaujoire, Nantes

=== Group G ===
Romania topped the group over England, while Colombia and Tunisia were unable to reach the last 16, despite Colombia having one win.

Pos	Team	Pld	W	D	L	GF	GA	GD	Pts	Qualification
1	Romania	3	2	1	0	4	2	+2	7	Advance to knockout stage
2	England	3	2	0	1	5	2	+3	6	Advance to knockout stage
3	Colombia	3	1	0	2	1	3	−2	3	
4	Tunisia	3	0	1	2	1	4	−3	1	

Source: FIFA

15 June 1998
England	2–0	Tunisia	Stade Vélodrome, Marseille
Romania	1–0	Colombia	Stade de Gerland, Lyon
22 June 1998
Colombia	1–0	Tunisia	Stade de la Mosson, Montpellier
Romania	2–1	England	Stade de Toulouse, Toulouse
26 June 1998
Colombia	0–2	England	Stade Félix-Bollaert, Lens
Romania	1–1	Tunisia	Stade de France, Saint-Denis

=== Group H ===
Argentina finished at the top of Group H against three debutants. Croatia took the runners-up spot while Jamaica and Japan failed to advance.

Pos	Team	Pld	W	D	L	GF	GA	GD	Pts	Qualification
1	Argentina	3	3	0	0	7	0	+7	9	Advance to knockout stage
2	Croatia	3	2	0	1	4	2	+2	6	Advance to knockout stage
3	Jamaica	3	1	0	2	3	9	−6	3	
4	Japan	3	0	0	3	1	4	−3	0	

Source: FIFA

14 June 1998
Argentina	1–0	Japan	Stade de Toulouse, Toulouse
Jamaica	1–3	Croatia	Stade Félix-Bollaert, Lens
20 June 1998
Japan	0–1	Croatia	Stade de la Beaujoire, Nantes
21 June 1998
Argentina	5–0	Jamaica	Parc des Princes, Paris
26 June 1998
Argentina	1–0	Croatia	Parc Lescure, Bordeaux
Japan	1–2	Jamaica	Stade de Gerland, Lyon

== Knockout stage ==
The knockout stage comprised the 16 teams that advanced from the group stage of the tournament. For each game in the knockout stage, any draw at 90 minutes was followed by 30 minutes of extra time; if scores were still level, there was a penalty shoot-out to determine who progressed to the next round. The golden goal rule was also used, whereby if a team scored during extra time, they would immediately win the game.

=== Bracket ===
The first games were played on 27 June 1998, and the final took place on 12 July 1998 in Paris.

Round of 16
27 June – Paris
Brazil	4
Chile	1
28 June – Saint-Denis
Nigeria	1
Denmark	4
29 June – Toulouse
Netherlands	2
FR Yugoslavia	1
30 June – Saint-Étienne
Argentina (p)	2 (4)
England	2 (3)
27 June – Marseille
Italy	1
Norway	0
28 June – Lens
France (g.g.)	1
Paraguay	0
29 June – Montpellier
Germany	2
Mexico	1
30 June – Bordeaux
Romania	0
Croatia	1

Quarter-finals
3 July – Nantes
Brazil	3
Denmark	2
4 July – Marseille
Netherlands	2
Argentina	1
3 July – Saint-Denis
Italy	0 (3)
France (p)	0 (4)
4 July – Lyon
Germany	0
Croatia	3

Semi-finals
7 July – Marseille
Brazil (p)	1 (4)
Netherlands	1 (2)
8 July – Saint-Denis
France	2
Croatia	1

Final
12 July – Saint-Denis
Brazil	0
France	3
Match for third place
11 July – Paris
Netherlands	1
Croatia	2

=== Round of 16 ===
27 June 1998
16:30 CEST (UTC+2)

Italy	1–0	Norway
Vieri 18'

Stade Vélodrome, Marseille
Attendance: 55,000
Referee: Bernd Heynemann (Germany)

27 June 1998
21:00 CEST (UTC+2)

Brazil	4–1	Chile
César Sampaio 11', 26'; Ronaldo 45+3' (pen.), 72'		Salas 70'

Parc des Princes, Paris
Attendance: 45,500
Referee: Marc Batta (France)

28 June 1998
16:30 CEST (UTC+2)

France	1–0 (a.e.t./g.g.)	Paraguay
Blanc 114'

Stade Félix-Bollaert, Lens
Attendance: 31,800
Referee: Ali Bujsaim (United Arab Emirates)

28 June 1998
21:00 CEST (UTC+2)

Nigeria	1–4	Denmark
Babangida 77'		Møller 3'; B. Laudrup 12'; Sand 58'; Helveg 76'

Stade de France, Saint-Denis
Attendance: 77,000
Referee: Urs Meier (Switzerland)

29 June 1998
16:30 CEST (UTC+2)

Germany	2–1	Mexico
Klinsmann 74'; Bierhoff 86'		Hernández 47'

Stade de la Mosson, Montpellier
Attendance: 29,800
Referee: Vítor Melo Pereira (Portugal)

29 June 1998
21:00 CEST (UTC+2)

Netherlands	2–1	FR Yugoslavia
Bergkamp 38'; Davids 90+2'		Komljenović 48'

Stade de Toulouse, Toulouse
Attendance: 33,500
Referee: José María García-Aranda (Spain)

30 June 1998
16:30 CEST (UTC+2)

Romania	0–1	Croatia
		Šuker 45+2' (pen.)

Parc Lescure, Bordeaux
Attendance: 31,800
Referee: Javier Castrilli (Argentina)

30 June 1998
21:00 CEST (UTC+2)

Argentina	2–2 (a.e.t.)	England
Batistuta 5' (pen.); Zanetti 45+1'		Shearer 9' (pen.); Owen 16'
Penalties
Berti (penalty scored); Crespo (penalty missed); Verón (penalty scored); Gallardo (penalty scored); Ayala (penalty scored)	4–3	(penalty scored) Shearer; (penalty missed) Ince; (penalty scored) Merson; (penalty scored) Owen; (penalty missed) Batty

Stade Geoffroy-Guichard, Saint-Étienne
Attendance: 30,600
Referee: Kim Milton Nielsen (Denmark)

=== Quarter-finals ===
3 July 1998
16:30 CEST (UTC+2)

Italy	0–0 (a.e.t.)	France
Penalties
R. Baggio (penalty scored); Albertini (penalty missed); Costacurta (penalty scored); Vieri (penalty scored); Di Biagio (penalty missed)	3–4	(penalty scored) Zidane; (penalty missed) Lizarazu; (penalty scored) Trezeguet; (penalty scored) Henry; (penalty scored) Blanc

Stade de France, Saint-Denis
Attendance: 77,000
Referee: Hugh Dallas (Scotland)

3 July 1998
21:00 CEST (UTC+2)

Brazil	3–2	Denmark
Bebeto 10'; Rivaldo 25', 59'		Jørgensen 2'; B. Laudrup 50'

Stade de la Beaujoire, Nantes
Attendance: 35,500
Referee: Gamal Al-Ghandour (Egypt)

4 July 1998
16:30 CEST (UTC+2)

Netherlands	2–1	Argentina
Kluivert 12'; Bergkamp 90'		López 17'

Stade Vélodrome, Marseille
Attendance: 55,000
Referee: Arturo Brizio Carter (Mexico)

4 July 1998
21:00 CEST (UTC+2)

Germany	0–3	Croatia
		Jarni 45+3'; Vlaović 80'; Šuker 85'

Stade de Gerland, Lyon
Attendance: 39,100
Referee: Rune Pedersen (Norway)

=== Semi-finals ===
7 July 1998
21:00 CEST (UTC+2)

Brazil	1–1 (a.e.t.)	Netherlands
Ronaldo 46'		Kluivert 87'
Penalties
Ronaldo (penalty scored); Rivaldo (penalty scored); Emerson (penalty scored); Dunga (penalty scored)	4–2	(penalty scored) F. de Boer; (penalty scored) Bergkamp; (penalty missed) Cocu; (penalty missed) R. de Boer

Stade Vélodrome, Marseille
Attendance: 54,000
Referee: Ali Bujsaim (United Arab Emirates)

8 July 1998
21:00 CEST (UTC+2)

France	2–1	Croatia
Thuram 47', 70'		Šuker 46'

Stade de France, Saint-Denis
Attendance: 76,000
Referee: José María García-Aranda (Spain)

=== Match for third place ===
Croatia beat the Netherlands to earn third place in the competition. Davor Šuker scored the winner in the 36th minute to secure the golden boot.

11 July 1998
21:00 CEST (UTC+2)

Netherlands	1–2	Croatia
Zenden 22'		Prosinečki 14'; Šuker 36'

Parc des Princes, Paris
Attendance: 45,500
Referee: Epifanio González (Paraguay)

=== Final ===
The final was held on 12 July 1998 at the Stade de France, Saint-Denis. France defeated holders Brazil 3–0, with two goals from Zinedine Zidane and a stoppage time strike from Emmanuel Petit. The win gave France their first World Cup title, becoming the sixth national team after Uruguay, Italy, England, West Germany and Argentina to win the tournament on their home soil. They also inflicted the second-heaviest World Cup defeat on Brazil, later to be topped by Brazil's 7–1 defeat by Germany in the semi-finals of the 2014 FIFA World Cup. As of 2026, this is the last time a host country reached the final.

The pre-match build up was dominated by the omission of Brazilian striker Ronaldo from the starting lineup only to be reinstated 45 minutes before kick-off. He managed to create the first open chance for Brazil in the 22nd minute, dribbling past defender Thuram before sending a cross out on the left side that goalkeeper Fabien Barthez struggled to hold onto. France however took the lead after Brazilian defender Roberto Carlos conceded a corner from which Zidane scored via a header. Three minutes before half-time, Zidane scored his second goal of the match, similarly another header from a corner. The tournament hosts went down to ten men in the 68th minute as Marcel Desailly was sent off for a second bookable offence. Brazil reacted to this by making an attacking substitution and although they applied pressure France sealed the win with a third goal: substitute Patrick Vieira set up his club teammate Petit in a counterattack to shoot low past goalkeeper Cláudio Taffarel.

French president Jacques Chirac was in attendance to congratulate the winners and commiserate the runners-up after the match. Several days after the victory, winning manager Aimé Jacquet announced his resignation from the French team with immediate effect.

12 July 1998
21:00 CEST (UTC+2)

Brazil	0–3	France
		Zidane 27', 45+1'; Petit 90+3'

Stade de France, Saint-Denis
Attendance: 80,000
Referee: Said Belqola (Morocco)

== Statistics ==
=== Goalscorers ===
Davor Šuker received the Golden Boot for scoring six goals. In total, 171 goals were scored by 112 players:

6 goals

- (Croatia) Davor Šuker

5 goals

- (Argentina) Gabriel Batistuta
- (Italy) Christian Vieri

4 goals

- (Brazil) Ronaldo
- (Chile) Marcelo Salas
- (Mexico) Luis Hernández

3 goals

- (Brazil) Bebeto
- (Brazil) César Sampaio
- (Brazil) Rivaldo
- (France) Thierry Henry
- (Germany) Oliver Bierhoff
- (Germany) Jürgen Klinsmann
- (Netherlands) Dennis Bergkamp

2 goals

- (Argentina) Ariel Ortega
- (Belgium) Marc Wilmots
- (Croatia) Robert Prosinečki
- (Denmark) Brian Laudrup
- (England) Michael Owen
- (England) Alan Shearer
- (France) Emmanuel Petit
- (France) Lilian Thuram
- (France) Zinedine Zidane
- (Italy) Roberto Baggio
- (Jamaica) Theodore Whitmore
- (Mexico) Ricardo Peláez
- (Morocco) Salaheddine Bassir
- (Morocco) Abdeljalil Hadda
- (Netherlands) Phillip Cocu
- (Netherlands) Ronald de Boer
- (Netherlands) Patrick Kluivert
- (Romania) Viorel Moldovan
- (South Africa) Shaun Bartlett
- (Spain) Fernando Hierro
- (Spain) Fernando Morientes
- (Federal Republic of Yugoslavia) Slobodan Komljenović

1 goal

- (Argentina) Claudio López
- (Argentina) Mauricio Pineda
- (Argentina) Javier Zanetti
- (Austria) Andreas Herzog
- (Austria) Toni Polster
- (Austria) Ivica Vastić
- (Belgium) Luc Nilis
- (Bulgaria) Emil Kostadinov
- (Cameroon) Patrick M'Boma
- (Cameroon) Pierre Njanka
- (Chile) José Luis Sierra
- (Colombia) Léider Preciado
- (Croatia) Robert Jarni
- (Croatia) Mario Stanić
- (Croatia) Goran Vlaović
- (Denmark) Thomas Helveg
- (Denmark) Martin Jørgensen
- (Denmark) Michael Laudrup
- (Denmark) Peter Møller
- (Denmark) Allan Nielsen
- (Denmark) Marc Rieper
- (Denmark) Ebbe Sand
- (England) Darren Anderton
- (England) David Beckham
- (England) Paul Scholes
- (France) Laurent Blanc
- (France) Youri Djorkaeff
- (France) Christophe Dugarry
- (France) Bixente Lizarazu
- (France) David Trezeguet
- (Germany) Andreas Möller
- (Iran) Mehdi Mahdavikia
- (Iran) Hamid Estili
- (Italy) Luigi Di Biagio
- (Jamaica) Robbie Earle
- (Japan) Masashi Nakayama
- (Mexico) Cuauhtémoc Blanco
- (Mexico) Alberto García Aspe
- (Morocco) Mustapha Hadji
- (Netherlands) Edgar Davids
- (Netherlands) Marc Overmars
- (Netherlands) Pierre van Hooijdonk
- (Netherlands) Boudewijn Zenden
- (Nigeria) Mutiu Adepoju
- (Nigeria) Tijani Babangida
- (Nigeria) Victor Ikpeba
- (Nigeria) Sunday Oliseh
- (Nigeria) Wilson Oruma
- (Norway) Dan Eggen
- (Norway) Håvard Flo
- (Norway) Tore André Flo
- (Norway) Kjetil Rekdal
- (Paraguay) Celso Ayala
- (Paraguay) Miguel Ángel Benítez
- (Paraguay) José Cardozo
- (Romania) Adrian Ilie
- (Romania) Dan Petrescu
- (Saudi Arabia) Sami Al-Jaber
- (Saudi Arabia) Yousuf Al-Thunayan
- (Scotland) Craig Burley
- (Scotland) John Collins
- (South Africa) Benni McCarthy
- (South Korea) Ha Seok-ju
- (South Korea) Yoo Sang-chul
- (Spain) Kiko
- (Spain) Luis Enrique
- (Spain) Raúl
- (Tunisia) Skander Souayah
- (United States) Brian McBride
- (Federal Republic of Yugoslavia) Siniša Mihajlović
- (Federal Republic of Yugoslavia) Predrag Mijatović
- (Federal Republic of Yugoslavia) Dragan Stojković

Own goals

- (Bulgaria) Georgi Bachev (against Spain)
- (Morocco) Youssef Chippo (against Norway)
- (Scotland) Tom Boyd (against Brazil)
- (South Africa) Pierre Issa (against France)
- (Spain) Andoni Zubizarreta (against Nigeria)
- (Federal Republic of Yugoslavia) Siniša Mihajlović (against Germany)

=== Discipline ===
Player	Offence(s)	Suspension(s)
(Bulgaria) Anatoli Nankov	(yellow card) (yellow-red card) in Group D vs Paraguay (matchday 1; 12 June)	Group D vs Nigeria (matchday 2; 19 June)
(South Korea) Ha Seok-ju	(red card) in Group E vs Mexico (matchday 1; 13 June)	Group E vs Netherlands (matchday 2; 20 June)
(Netherlands) Patrick Kluivert	(red card) in Group E vs Belgium (matchday 1; 13 June)	Group E vs South Korea (matchday 2; 20 June); Group E vs Mexico (matchday 3; 25 June)
(Scotland) Darren Jackson	(yellow card) in Group A vs Brazil (matchday 1; 10 June); (yellow card) in Group A vs Norway (matchday 2; 16 June)	Group A vs Morocco (matchday 3; 23 June)
(Brazil) César Sampaio	(yellow card) in Group A vs Scotland (matchday 1; 10 June); (yellow card) in Group A vs Morocco (matchday 2; 16 June)	Group A vs Norway (matchday 3; 23 June)
(Morocco) Saïd Chiba	(yellow card) in Group A vs Norway (matchday 1; 10 June); (yellow card) in Group A vs Morocco (matchday 2; 16 June)	Group A vs Scotland (matchday 3; 23 June)
(Cameroon) Raymond Kalla	(red card) in Group B vs Italy (matchday 2; 17 June)	Group B vs Chile (matchday 3; 23 June)
(Denmark) Miklos Molnar	(red card) in Group C vs South Africa (matchday 2; 18 June)	Group C vs France (matchday 3; 24 June); Round of 16 vs Nigeria (28 June)
(South Africa) Alfred Phiri	(red card) in Group C vs Denmark (matchday 2; 18 June)	Group C vs Saudi Arabia (matchday 3; 24 June)
(Denmark) Morten Wieghorst	(red card) in Group C vs South Africa (matchday 2; 18 June)	Group C vs France (matchday 3; 24 June)
(Saudi Arabia) Mohammed Al-Khilaiwi	(red card) in Group C vs France (matchday 2; 18 June)	Group C vs South Africa (matchday 3; 24 June)
(France) Zinedine Zidane	(red card) in Group C vs Saudi Arabia (matchday 2; 18 June)	Group C vs Denmark (matchday 3; 24 June); Round of 16 vs Paraguay (28 June)
(Nigeria) Uche Okechukwu	(yellow card) in Group D vs Spain (matchday 1; 13 June); (yellow card) in Group D vs Bulgaria (matchday 2; 19 June)	Group D vs Paraguay (matchday 3; 24 June)
(Japan) Eisuke Nakanishi	(yellow card) in Group H vs Argentina (matchday 1; 14 June); (yellow card) in Group H vs Croatia (matchday 2; 20 June)	Group H vs Jamaica (matchday 3; 26 June)
(Mexico) Pável Pardo	(red card) in Group E vs Belgium (matchday 2; 20 June)	Group E vs Netherlands (matchday 3; 25 June)
(Belgium) Gert Verheyen	(red card) in Group E vs Mexico (matchday 2; 20 June)	Group E vs South Korea (matchday 3; 25 June)
(Jamaica) Darryl Powell	(yellow card) (yellow-red card) in Group H vs Argentina (matchday 2; 21 June)	Group H vs Japan (matchday 3; 26 June)
(Colombia) José Santa	(yellow card) in Group G vs Romania (matchday 1; 15 June); (yellow card) in Group G vs Tunisia (matchday 2; 22 June)	Group G vs England (matchday 3; 26 June)
(Tunisia) José Clayton	(yellow card) in Group G vs England (matchday 1; 15 June); (yellow card) in Group G vs Colombia (matchday 2; 22 June)	Group G vs Romania (matchday 3; 26 June)
(Romania) Iulian Filipescu	(yellow card) in Group G vs Colombia (matchday 1; 15 June); (yellow card) in Group G vs England (matchday 2; 22 June)	Group G vs Tunisia (matchday 3; 26 June)
(Chile) Nelson Parraguez	(yellow card) in Group B vs Italy (matchday 1; 11 June); (yellow card) in Group B vs Cameroon (matchday 3; 23 June)	Round of 16 vs Brazil (27 June)
(Cameroon) Rigobert Song	(red card) in Group B vs Chile (matchday 3; 23 June)	Suspension served outside tournament
(Chile) Francisco Rojas	(yellow card) in Group B vs Italy (matchday 1; 11 June); (yellow card) in Group B vs Cameroon (matchday 3; 23 June)	Round of 16 vs Brazil (27 June)
(Chile) Moisés Villarroel	(yellow card) in Group B vs Austria (matchday 2; 17 June); (yellow card) in Group B vs Cameroon (matchday 3; 23 June)	Round of 16 vs Brazil (27 June)
(Cameroon) Lauren	(red card) in Group B vs Chile (matchday 3; 23 June)	Suspension served outside tournament
(Scotland) Craig Burley	(red card) in Group A vs Morocco (matchday 3; 23 June)	Suspension served outside tournament
(Mexico) Ramón Ramírez	(red card) in Group E vs Netherlands (matchday 3; 25 June)	Round of 16 vs Germany (29 June)
(Croatia) Zvonimir Soldo	(yellow card) in Group H vs Jamaica (matchday 1; 14 June); (yellow card) in Group H vs Argentina (matchday 3; 26 June)	Round of 16 vs Romania (30 June)
(England) David Beckham	(red card) in Round of 16 vs Argentina (30 June)	Suspension served outside tournament
(Brazil) Cafu	(yellow card) in Round of 16 vs Chile (27 June); (yellow card) in Quarter-finals vs Denmark (3 July)	Semi-finals vs Netherlands (7 July)
(Netherlands) Arthur Numan	(yellow card) (yellow-red card) in Quarter-finals vs Argentina (4 July)	Semi-finals vs Brazil (7 July)
(Argentina) Ariel Ortega	(red card) in Quarter-finals vs Netherlands (4 July)	Suspension served outside tournament
(Germany) Christian Wörns	(red card) in Quarter-finals vs Croatia (4 July)	Suspension served outside tournament
(France) Laurent Blanc	(red card) in Semi-finals vs Croatia (8 July)	Final vs Brazil (12 July)
(Croatia) Dario Šimić	(yellow card) in Quarter-finals vs Germany (4 July); (yellow card) in Semi-finals vs France (8 July)	Match for third place vs Netherlands (11 July)
(France) Marcel Desailly	(yellow card) (yellow-red card) in Final vs Brazil (12 July)	Suspension served outside tournament

=== Awards ===
Golden Ball Award	Golden Shoe Award	Yashin Award	FIFA Fair Play Trophy	Most Entertaining Team
(Brazil) Ronaldo	(Croatia) Davor Šuker	(France) Fabien Barthez	England; France	France

=== Players who were red-carded during the tournament ===
- (Argentina) Ariel Ortega
- (Belgium) Gert Verheyen
- (Bulgaria) Anatoli Nankov
- (Cameroon) Raymond Kalla
- (Cameroon) Lauren
- (Cameroon) Rigobert Song
- (Denmark) Miklos Molnar
- (Denmark) Morten Wieghorst
- (England) David Beckham
- (France) Laurent Blanc
- (France) Marcel Desailly
- (France) Zinedine Zidane
- (Germany) Christian Wörns
- (Jamaica) Darryl Powell
- (South Korea) Ha Seok-ju
- (Mexico) Pável Pardo
- (Mexico) Ramón Ramírez
- (Netherlands) Patrick Kluivert
- (Netherlands) Arthur Numan
- (Saudi Arabia) Mohammed Al-Khilaiwi
- (Scotland) Craig Burley
- (South Africa) Alfred Phiri

=== All-star team ===
The All-star team is a squad consisting of the 16 most impressive players at the 1998 World Cup, as selected by FIFA's Technical Study Group.

Goalkeepers	Defenders	Midfielders	Forwards
(France) Fabien Barthez (Paraguay) José Luis Chilavert	(Brazil) Roberto Carlos (France) Marcel Desailly (France) Lilian Thuram (Netherlands) Frank de Boer (Paraguay) Carlos Gamarra	(Brazil) Dunga (Brazil) Rivaldo (Denmark) Michael Laudrup (France) Zinedine Zidane (Netherlands) Edgar Davids	(Brazil) Ronaldo (Croatia) Davor Šuker (Denmark) Brian Laudrup (Netherlands) Dennis Bergkamp

=== Tournament ranking ===
Per statistical convention in football, matches decided in extra time are counted as wins and losses, while matches decided by penalty shoot-outs are counted as draws.

Pos	Grp	Team	Pld	W	D	L	GF	GA	GD	Pts	Final result
1	C	France (H)	7	6	1	0	15	2	+13	19	Champions
2	A	Brazil	7	4	1	2	14	10	+4	13	Runners-up
3	H	Croatia	7	5	0	2	11	5	+6	15	Third place
4	E	Netherlands	7	3	3	1	13	7	+6	12	Fourth place
5	B	Italy	5	3	2	0	8	3	+5	11	Eliminated in quarter-finals
6	H	Argentina	5	3	1	1	10	4	+6	10	Eliminated in quarter-finals
7	F	Germany	5	3	1	1	8	6	+2	10	Eliminated in quarter-finals
8	C	Denmark	5	2	1	2	9	7	+2	7	Eliminated in quarter-finals
9	G	England	4	2	1	1	7	4	+3	7	Eliminated in round of 16
10	F	FR Yugoslavia	4	2	1	1	5	4	+1	7	Eliminated in round of 16
11	G	Romania	4	2	1	1	4	3	+1	7	Eliminated in round of 16
12	D	Nigeria	4	2	0	2	6	9	−3	6	Eliminated in round of 16
13	E	Mexico	4	1	2	1	8	7	+1	5	Eliminated in round of 16
14	D	Paraguay	4	1	2	1	3	2	+1	5	Eliminated in round of 16
15	A	Norway	4	1	2	1	5	5	0	5	Eliminated in round of 16
16	B	Chile	4	0	3	1	5	8	−3	3	Eliminated in round of 16
17	D	Spain	3	1	1	1	8	4	+4	4	Eliminated in group stage
18	A	Morocco	3	1	1	1	5	5	0	4	Eliminated in group stage
19	E	Belgium	3	0	3	0	3	3	0	3	Eliminated in group stage
20	F	Iran	3	1	0	2	2	4	−2	3	Eliminated in group stage
21	G	Colombia	3	1	0	2	1	3	−2	3	Eliminated in group stage
22	H	Jamaica	3	1	0	2	3	9	−6	3	Eliminated in group stage
23	B	Austria	3	0	2	1	3	4	−1	2	Eliminated in group stage
24	C	South Africa	3	0	2	1	3	6	−3	2	Eliminated in group stage
25	B	Cameroon	3	0	2	1	2	5	−3	2	Eliminated in group stage
26	G	Tunisia	3	0	1	2	1	4	−3	1	Eliminated in group stage
27	A	Scotland	3	0	1	2	2	6	−4	1	Eliminated in group stage
28	C	Saudi Arabia	3	0	1	2	2	7	−5	1	Eliminated in group stage
29	D	Bulgaria	3	0	1	2	1	7	−6	1	Eliminated in group stage
30	E	South Korea	3	0	1	2	2	9	−7	1	Eliminated in group stage
31	H	Japan	3	0	0	3	1	4	−3	0	Eliminated in group stage
32	F	United States	3	0	0	3	1	5	−4	0	Eliminated in group stage

Source: FIFA
(H) Hosts

== Marketing ==
=== Tournoi de France ===
A year before the tournament, a small, invitation-only tournament named the Tournoi de France was held in France, with Italy, Brazil, England, and hosts France participating.

=== Broadcasting ===
Through several companies, FIFA sold the broadcasting rights for the 1998 FIFA World Cup to many broadcasters. BBC and ITV had the broadcasting rights in the United Kingdom. The pictures and audio of the competition were supplied to the TV and radio channels by the company TVRS 98, the broadcaster of the tournament.

The World Cup matches were broadcast in 200 countries. 818 photographers were credited for the tournament. In every match, a stand was reserved for the press. The number of places granted to them reached its maximum in the final, when 1,750 reporters and 110 TV commentators were present in the stand.

Country	Broadcaster	Television
Albania	TVSH	
Argentina	Artear, Televisión Federal, Grupo América, Telearte, SNMP, Teletreinta, Argentina Televisión, Lujan Cable Visión S.A., Holding Córdoba de radio y televisión	Eltrece, Telefe, América TV, Channel 30, Argenvisión, Channel 23, El CW
Australia	SBS	
Austria	ORF	ORF eins and ORF 2
Arab League	Arab States Broadcasting Union (ASBU), Orbit Network	Orbit ESPN
Belgium	Dutch: VRT	Dutch: Eén and Canvas
Belgium	French: RTBF	French: La Une and La Deux
Bangladesh	BTV	
Bolivia	TVB and Red ATB	
Brazil	Globo, Band, SBT, RecordTV, Manchete, SporTV and ESPN Brasil	
Brunei	RTB	RTB Perdana, RTB Aneka
Bulgaria	BNT	Channel 1 and Efir 2
Cambodia	TVK	Channel 7
Canada	English: CBC	English: CBC Television
Canada	French: Société Radio-Canada	French: Télévision de Radio-Canada
Chile	TVN, Chilevisión, UCTV and Megavisión	
China	CCTV	CCTV-1
Colombia	Inravisión	Canal Uno: PUNCH and JES; Canal A: RTI and Datos y Mensajes
Colombia	Caracol Televisión and RCN Televisión	
Corsica^{2}	(France) TF1, 1998 FIFA World Cup TV^{2} (Italy) RAI	(France) TF1, 1998 FIFA World Cup TV2 and 1998 FIFA World Cup TV3^{2}
Czech Republic	Czech Television	ČT1 and ČT2
Denmark	DR	DR1 and DR2
Estonia	ETV	
Finland	YLE, MTV3	YLE TV2
France^{2}	TF1, 1998 FIFA World Cup TV^{2}	TF1, 1998 FIFA World Cup TV2, 1998 FIFA World Cup TV3, 1998 FIFA World Cup TV4, 1998 FIFA World Cup TV International and 1998 FIFA World Cup TV News^{2}
Georgia	GPB	1TV
Germany	ARD and ZDF	Das Erste and ZDF
Greece	ERT	ET1, NET and ET3
Hungary	MTV	MTV1 and MTV2
Holy See	(Italy) RAI	(Italy) RAI 1, RAI 2 and RAI 3
Hong Kong	TVB	Cantonese: TVB Jade
Hong Kong	TVB	English: TVB Pearl
India	Doordarshan	Doordarshan National Channel
Indonesia^{1}	TVRI (Programme 1), RCTI, SCTV, TPI, ANteve, and Indosiar (all matches in live television)^{1}	
Iran	IRIB	Channel 1 and Channel 2
Ireland	RTÉ	RTÉ One and RTÉ Two
Israel	IBA	Hebrew: Channel 1
Israel	IBA	Arabic: Channel 33
Italy	RAI	RAI 1, RAI 2 and RAI 3
Japan	NHK, Fuji Television, TBS, Nippon Television, TV Asahi and TV Tokyo	NHK General TV, Fuji Television, TBS Television, Nippon Television, TV Asahi and TV Tokyo
Laos	LNTV	
Macau	TVB	Cantonese: TVB Jade
Macau	TVB	English: TVB Pearl
Latin America	Bein TV, DirecTV	Channels 530 and 532 of Bein TV; Channels 610 and 612 of DirecTV
Malaysia^{2}	RTM, STMB, NTV7	TV1, TV2, TV3, NTV7
Mexico	Televisa, TV Azteca	Canal de las Estrellas, XHDF-TDT
Monaco^{2}	(France) TF1, 1998 FIFA World Cup TV^{2} (Italy) Telemontecarlo	(France) TF1, 1998 FIFA World Cup TV2, 1998 FIFA World Cup TV3, 1998 FIFA World Cup TV4, 1998 FIFA World Cup TV International and 1998 FIFA World Cup TV News (all matches of international broadcast signal)^{2} (Italy) Telemontecarlo
Myanmar	MRTV	Channel 5
Netherlands	NPO	Nederland 1, Nederland 2 and Nederland 3
New Zealand	TVNZ	TV1 and TV2
Norway	NRK	NRK1 and NRK2
Paraguay	TV Acción, TV Cerro Corá, Tevedos, Teledifusora Paraguaya, SICOM TV, Hispanoamérica TV, Canal 5 TV Color, Caacupé Cable Visión S.A., Holding Paraná de radio y televisión	Telefuturo, SNT, Red Guaraní Canal 13, Paraguay TV, La Tele, Paravisión, Canal 25, RTV
Peru	América Televisión and Panamericana Televisión.	
Philippines	GMA Network and Sky Cable	
Poland	TVP	TVP1 and TVP2
Portugal	RTP	RTP1 and RTP2
Russia	VGTRK, ORT	Rossiya 1, Channel One Russia
San Marino	(Italy) RAI	(Italy) RAI 1, RAI 2 and RAI 3
Singapore	Singapore International Media	Premiere 12
Slovakia	STV	STV1 and STV2
South Africa	SABC	SABC 1, SABC 2 and SABC 3
South Korea	KBS	
Spain	RTVE	TVE (TV1 and TV2)
Sweden	SVT	SVT1 and SVT2
Switzerland	SRG SSR	SF 1 (German), TSR 2 (French) and TSI 2 (Italian)
Taiwan	TTV, CTV, CTS and FTV	
Thailand	Television Pool of Thailand	
Turkey	TRT	TRT 1, TRT 2 and TRT 3
United Kingdom	BBC and ITV	BBC One and ITV^{3}
United States	ABC, ESPN (English) and Univision (Spanish)	
Ukraine	UT-1 and 1+1	
Uruguay	Tevetres, Monte Carlo Televisión, Sociedad Anónima Emisora de Televisión y Anexos, Sociedad Televisora Larrañaga, SODRE, Franco-Hispano TV, Canal 8 TV Color, Canelones Cable Visión S.A., Holding Rivera de radio y televisión	Channel 3, Channel 4, Channel 10, Teledoce, UTC, Uruvisión, Canal 27, STV
Vietnam	Vietnam Television, Ho Chi Minh City Television	VTV1, VTV3, HTV7, HTV9
Venezuela	Venevisión, RCTV, VTV	

Notes:

1. Indonesia screened the tournament simulcast via 6-national free-to-air terrestrial television stations. It was broadcast simultaneously by 1-national state-owned public free-to-air terrestrial television station (TVRI) and relayed by the 5-national private commercial free-to-air terrestrial television stations (RCTI, SCTV, TPI, ANteve, and Indosiar). They provided Indonesian sports commentary on all 64 matches.
2. It is a joint venture of TF1, France Télévisions and TV5Monde.
3. ITV did not use the official FIFA live feed. Instead, they took their own camera equipment over to France and shot the matches from the opposite side of the pitch of the FIFA feed cameras. This seen the station use their own on-screen graphics and enabled U.K. viewers to see the Vauxhall billboards (U.K. arm of General Motors).

=== Sponsorship ===
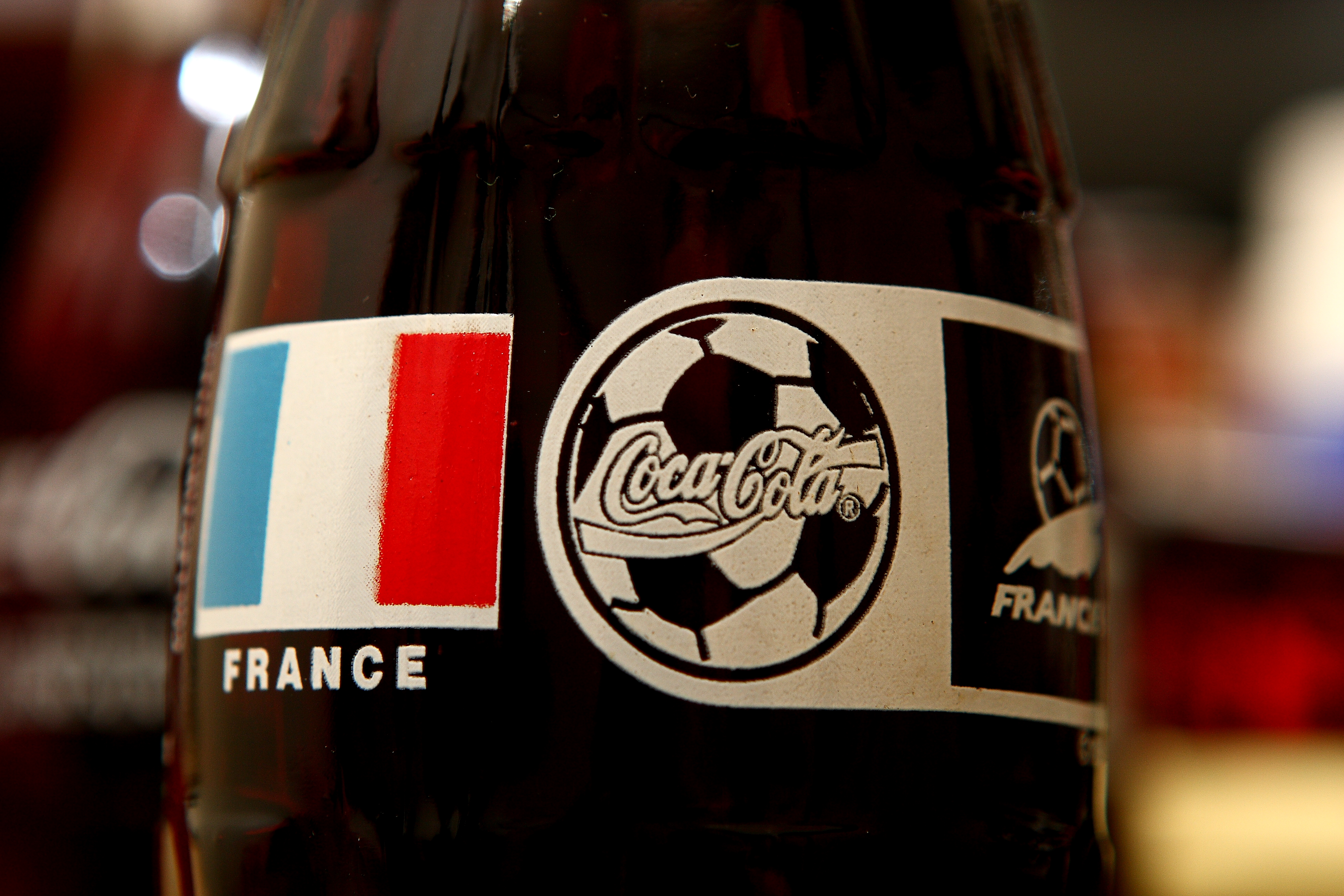
Coca-Cola was one of the sponsors of FIFA World Cup 1998.

The sponsors of the 1998 FIFA World Cup are divided into two categories: FIFA World Cup Sponsors and France Supporters.

FIFA World Cup sponsors	France Supporters
Adidas; Budweiser; Canon; Casio; Coca-Cola; Fujifilm; Gillette (Braun); JVC; MasterCard; McDonald's; Opel; Philips; Snickers	Air France; Citroën; Crédit Agricole; Danone; France Telecom; La Poste; Peugeot; Renault; Vauxhall

The absence of Budweiser on pitch side advertising hoardings is notable due to the Evin law, which forbids alcohol-related sponsorship in France, including in sports events.

=== Video games ===
In most of the world, the official video game was, World Cup 98 released by EA Sports on 13 March 1998 for Microsoft Windows, PlayStation, Nintendo 64 and the Game Boy. It was the first international football game developed by Electronic Arts since obtaining the rights from FIFA in 1997 and received mostly favourable reviews.

In Japan, Konami was granted the FIFA World Cup licence and produced two distinct video games: Jikkyou World Soccer: World Cup France 98 by KCEO for the Nintendo 64, and World Soccer Jikkyou Winning Eleven 3: World Cup France '98 by KCET for the PlayStation. These games were released in the rest of the world as International Superstar Soccer '98 and International Superstar Soccer Pro '98, without the official FIFA World Cup licence, branding or real player names.

Also in Japan, Sega was granted the FIFA World Cup licence to produce the Saturn video game World Cup '98 France: Road to Win.

Many other video games, including World League Soccer 98, Actua Soccer 2 and Neo Geo Cup '98: The Road to the Victory were released in the buildup to the 1998 World Cup and evidently were based on the tournament. FIFA: Road to World Cup 98, also by EA Sports focused on the qualification stage.

== Symbols ==
Footix, the official mascot of the tournament

=== Mascot ===
The official mascot was Footix, a rooster first presented in May 1996. It was created by graphic designer Fabrice Pialot and selected from a shortlist of five mascots. Research carried out about the choice of having a cockerel as a mascot was greatly received: 91% associated it immediately with France, the traditional symbol of the nation. Footix, the name chosen by French television viewers, is a portmanteau of "football" and the ending "-ix" from the popular Astérix comic strip. The mascot's colours reflect those of the host nation's flag and home strip – blue for the jump suit, a red crest and with the words 'France 98' coloured in white.

=== Match ball ===
The official match ball for the 1998 World Cup, manufactured by Adidas was named the Tricolore, meaning 'three-coloured' in French. It was the eighth World Cup match ball made for the tournament by the German company and was the first in the series to be multi-coloured. The tricolour flag and cockerel, traditional symbols of France, were used as inspiration for the design.

=== Music ===
The official song of the 1998 FIFA World Cup was "The Cup of Life", also known as "La Copa de la Vida", recorded by Ricky Martin.

The official anthem was "La Cour des Grands (Do You Mind If I Play)" by Youssou N'Dour and Axelle Red.

== Legacy ==
Honorary FIFA President João Havelange praised France's hosting of the World Cup, describing the tournament as one that would "remain with me forever, as I am sure they will remain with everyone who witnessed this unforgettable competition". Lennart Johansson, the chairman of the organising committee for the World Cup and President of UEFA added that France provided "subject matter of a quality that made the world hold its breath".

Cour des Comptes, the quasi-judicial body of the French government, released its report on the organisation of the 1998 World Cup in 2000.

The 1998 World Cup is considered by pundits to be one of the greatest editions of the tournament ever.

== See also ==
- Music of the World Cup: Allez! Ola! Ole! – The Official 1998 FIFA World Cup music album
- 1998 World Cup terror plot
