= Civaux Nuclear Power Plant =

Nuclear power plant located in Civaux, France

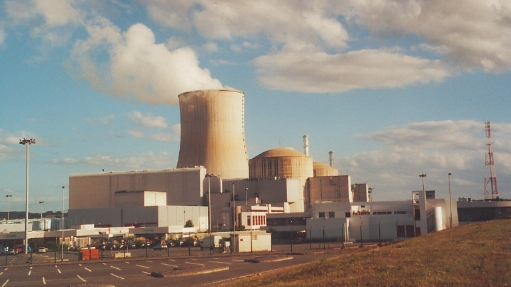
- Civaux Nuclear Power Plant
- Official name: Centrale Nucléaire de Civaux
- Country: France
- Location: Civaux (Vienne)
- Coordinates: 46°27′24″N 0°39′10″E
- Status: Operational
- Construction began: October 15, 1988; 37 years ago
- Commission date: January 29, 2002; 24 years ago
- Operator: EDF

Nuclear power station
- Reactor type: PWR; N4
- Reactor supplier: Framatome
- Cooling towers: 2
- Cooling source: Vienne River

Power generation
- Units operational: 2 x 1561 MW
- Make and model: Alstom
- Nameplate capacity: 3,122 MW
- Capacity factor: 78.5%
- Annual net output: 21,458 GW·h

External links
- Website: Site c/o EDF
- Commons: Related media on Commons

The Civaux Nuclear Power Plant is located in the commune of Civaux (Vienne) at the edge of Vienne River between Confolens (60 km upstream) and Chauvigny (14 km downstream), and 44 km south-east of Poitiers.

It has two operating units that were the precursors to the European Pressurized Reactor, being the "N4 stage". Designed for a net power output of 1450 MWe per unit, power was uprated to 1500 MWe in 2010. The Civaux plant uses ambient air and water from the Vienne River for cooling.

As of 2022, 1300 people work at the plant.

The cooling towers of Civaux Nuclear Power Plant are 178 metres in height, which are the highest among those of EDF's nuclear power plants.

== Events ==
- On 12 May 1998 there was a leak on an elbow in a pipe of the reactor coolant system. Water leaked out at the rate of 30 cubic meters per hour. It was classified as an INES level-2 event.
- Civaux was a proposed target in the 1998 World Cup terror plot; it was planned that Armed Islamic Group terrorists would crash a hijacked aeroplane into the plant on 15 June 1998. The plot was foiled with a mass arrest of conspirators on 26 May.
- In June 2001, following the first pressure test, the ASN published an incident report, classified as an INES level-1, due to a "leak in the containment building". The concrete in both the internal and external containment buildings was found to be cracked.
- In 2018, once repairs had been carried out, the ASN reported a lack of earthquake resistance in the electrical power supply panels of the Civaux 1 and 2 and Chooz 1 reactors, a defect detected by EDF in 2015 and 2016. This anomaly is classified as an INES level-1 for the Civaux reactors and level-0 for the Chooz reactor.
- In 2021, during the decennial safety inspection of reactor No. 1, which began in August, EDF detected stress corrosion cracks in the safety injection system of the primary circuit. Reactor No. 2 was shut down on 20 November for similar inspections, which revealed the same defect. After repairs, Unit 1 was reconnected to the grid on 25 January 2023 and Unit 2 on 3 April 2023.
- On 2 November 2022, the decennial leak-tightness test of the primary circuit of Unit 1 was interrupted following a mechanical failure of a temporary device installed specifically for the test. The failure caused a depressurisation of the circuit and a flow of water into a room inside the reactor building. The event had no impact on the safety of the facility, as the reactor vessel contained no fuel elements, and no impact on the environment, since the slightly radioactive water was collected by the systems designed for this purpose. A second leak-tightness test was successfully carried out on Thursday, 17 November, in the presence of ASN inspectors.

== Reactors ==
Unit	Type	Model	Net power	Total power	Construction start	Construction finish	Commercial operation	Shut down
CIVAUX-1	PWR	N4	1495 MW	1561 MW	1988/10/15	1997/12/24	2002/01/29	
CIVAUX-2	PWR	N4	1495 MW	1561 MW	1991/04/01	1999/12/24	2002/04/23	

== Gallery ==
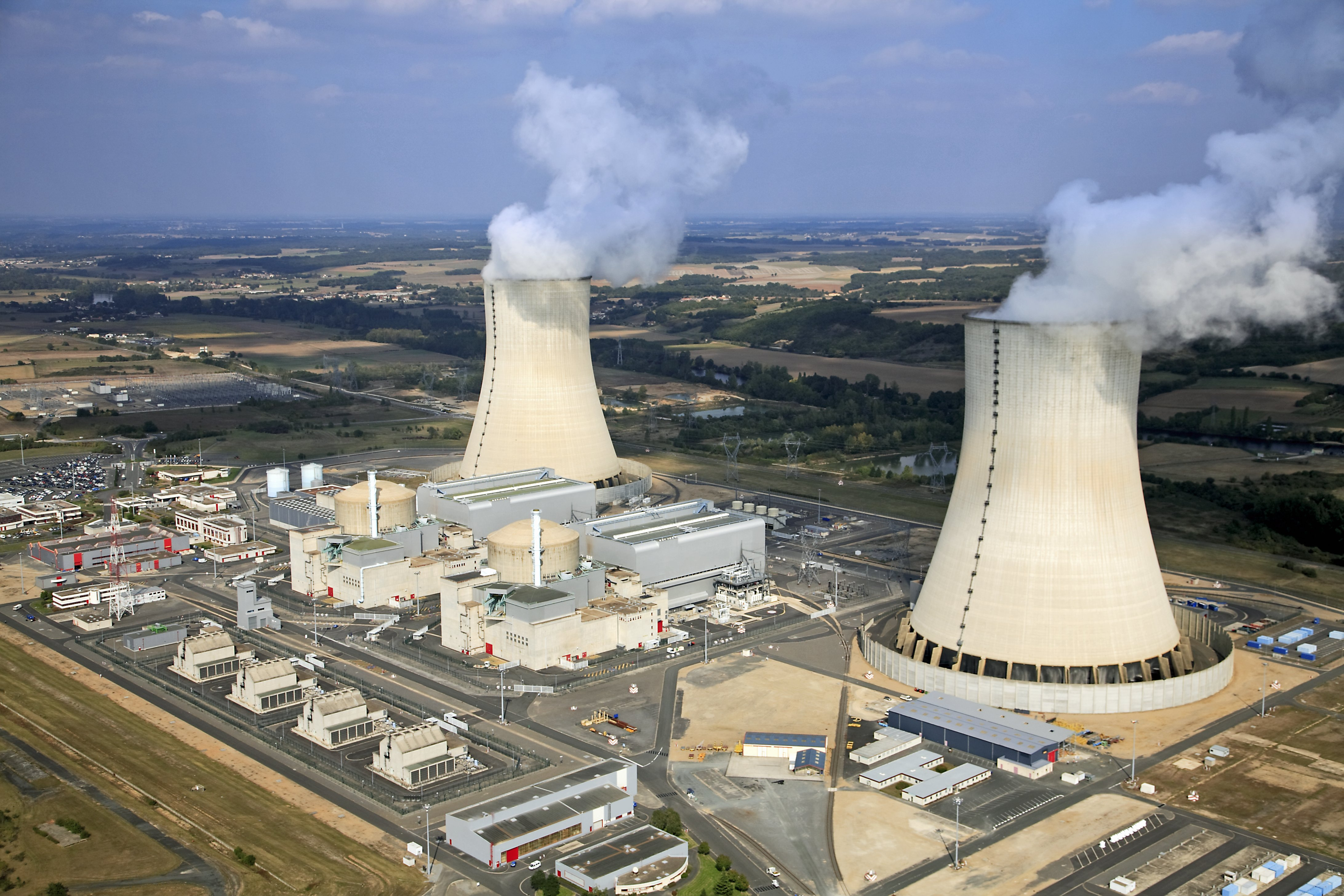
Civaux Nuclear Power Plant (2005)

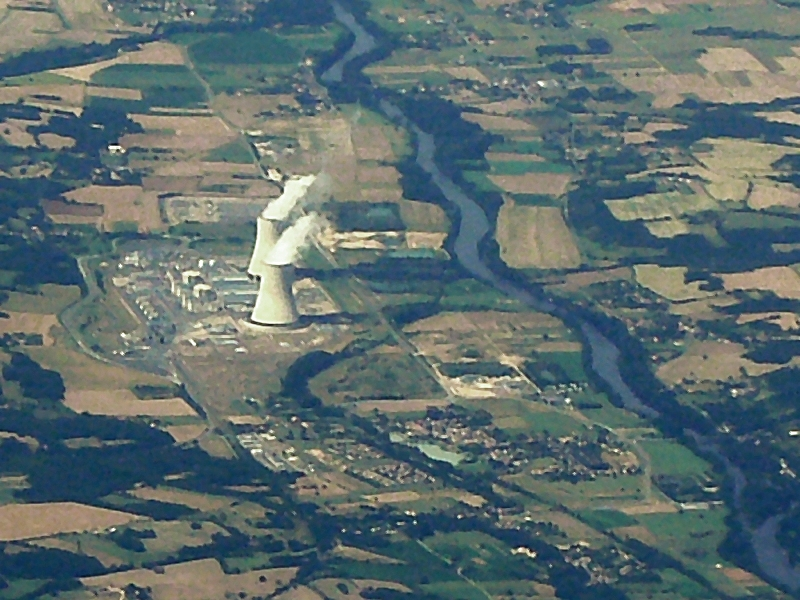
Aerial view

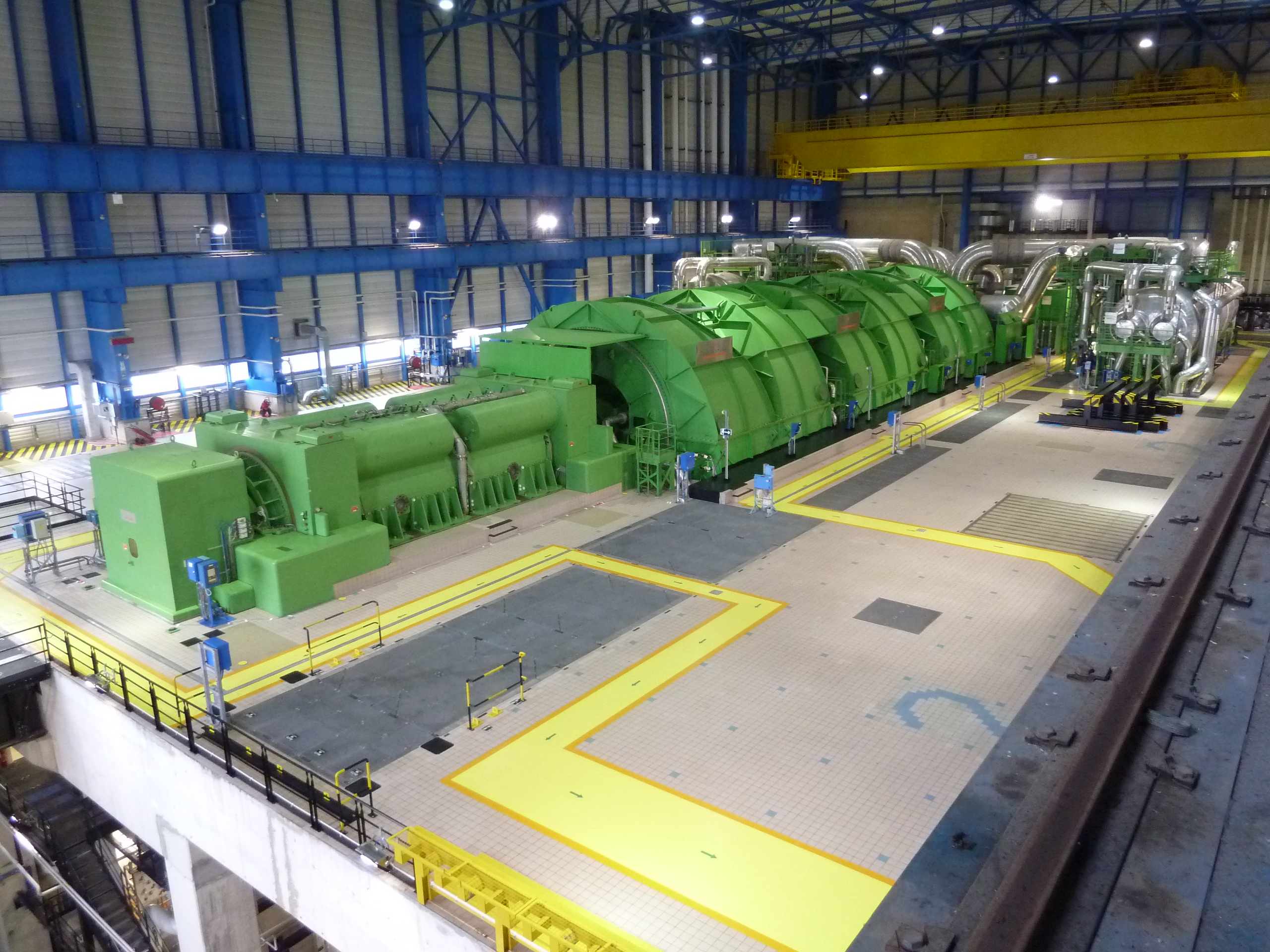
Turbine hall

== See also ==
- EDF
- Pressurized water reactor
- Chooz Nuclear Power Plant
