= Civaux =

- Commune
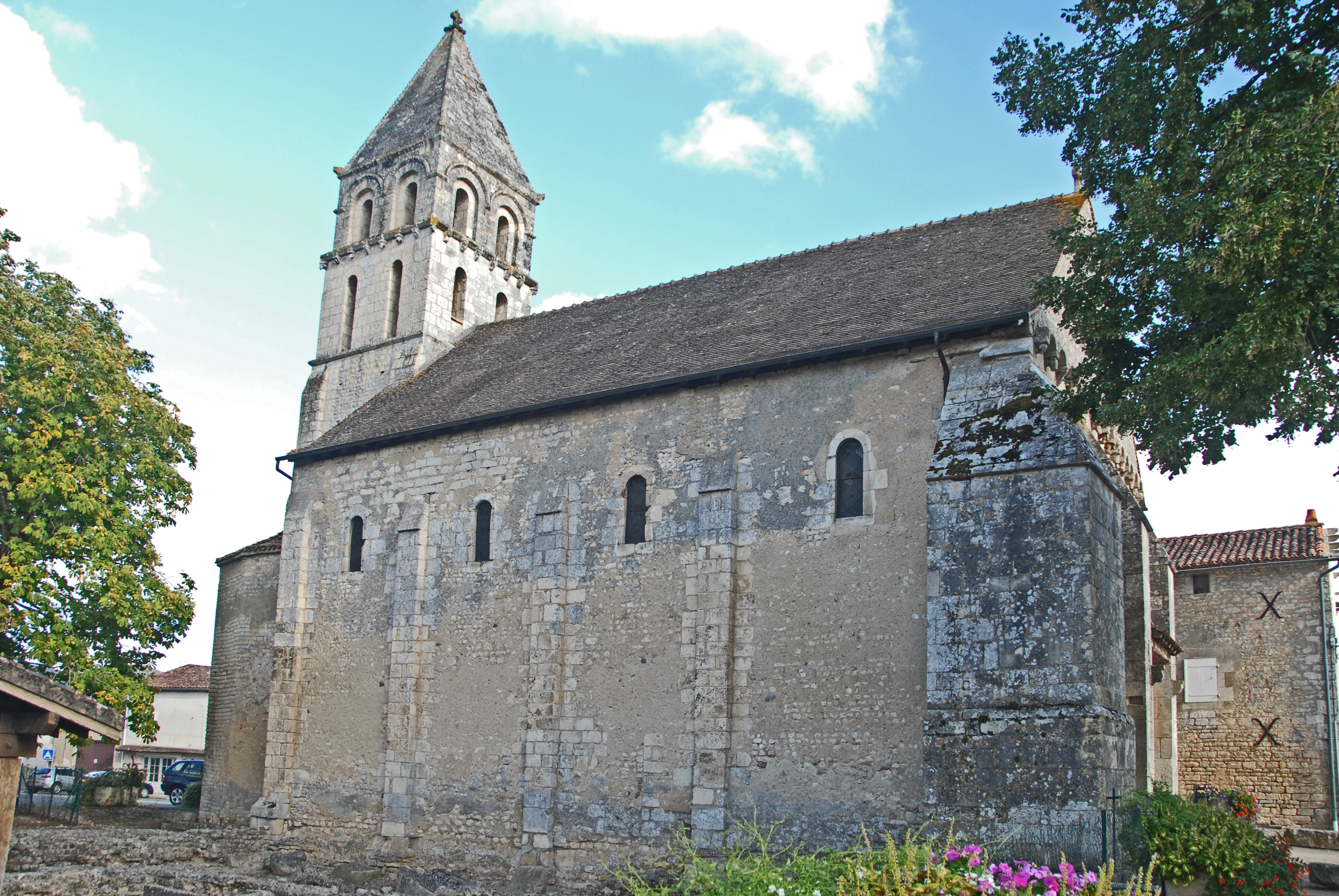
- The church of Saint-Gervais-Saint-Protais, in Civaux
- Location of Civaux
- Location within France Location within Nouvelle-Aquitaine
- Coordinates: 46°26′43″N 0°40′01″E
- Country: France
- Region: Nouvelle-Aquitaine
- Department: Vienne
- Arrondissement: Montmorillon
- Canton: Lussac-les-Châteaux

Government
  - Mayor (2020–2026): Marie-Renée Desroses
- Area^{1}: 26.39 km^{2} (10.19 sq mi)
- Elevation: 108 m (354 ft)
- Highest elevation: 149 m (489 ft)
- Lowest elevation: 67 m (220 ft)
- Population (2023): 1,210
  - Density: 45.9/km^{2} (119/sq mi)
- Time zone: UTC+01:00 (CET)
  - Summer (DST): UTC+02:00 (CEST)
- INSEE/Postal code: 86077 /86320
- ^{1} French Land Register data, which excludes lakes, ponds, glaciers > 1 km^{2} (0.386 sq mi or 247 acres) and river estuaries.

Civaux (French pronunciation: [sivo]) is a commune in the Vienne department, in the region of Nouvelle-Aquitaine, France.

== See also ==
- Communes of the Vienne department
- Civaux Nuclear Power Plant
