= 1998 World Cup terror plot =

Uncovered by European law enforcement

Potential targets

From March to May 1998, a terror plot against the 1998 FIFA World Cup in France was uncovered by European law enforcement agencies. More than 100 people were arrested in seven countries as a result of the plot, although only some of them were tried or convicted. Organised by the Armed Islamic Group of Algeria (GIA) and backed by al-Qaeda leader Osama bin Laden, the plot is thought to have targeted the England–Tunisia match on 15 June 1998, and involved infiltrating the Stade Vélodrome in Marseille in order to attack players and spectators during the game, attack the hotel in Paris hosting the United States national team, and finally hijacking an aircraft and crashing it into the Civaux Nuclear Power Plant near Poitiers.

== Raids and arrests ==
The original suspect of the plot was French-Algerian Farid Melouk, who had previously been sentenced in absentia to seven years in prison in France for his connection to the 1995 Paris Métro and RER bombings. Melouk had reportedly been tracked by intelligence services following his entry into Belgium, where he was found to be in contact with Ahmed Zaoui and a GIA-linked Brussels mosque. On 3 March, after two weeks of surveillance, 50 police officers stormed a house where Melouk was staying with others involved in the plot. Ten people including Swedish and Danish nationals were arrested in the 12-hour siege, amid a series of anti-terrorism raids in Belgium. Large amounts of liquid explosives were found during the raid, as well as detonators, a Kalashnikov rifle, several handguns and thousands of US dollars in cash. In addition, a large number of documents, brochures and maps relating to the World Cup were retrieved. More explosives were uncovered in a follow-up raid of another house.

The March raid was part of a joint security operation between Belgium, France, Sweden, Italy and the United Kingdom. Despite initial Belgian claims denying links to any plot against the World Cup, the plot was later confirmed by the French counter-intelligence chief. Melouk was sentenced to 9 years in prison for charges including attempted murder. In early May, eight suspected militants linked to the plot were arrested in the United Kingdom.

On 26 May, 88 people were detained in co-ordinated operations across France, Belgium, Italy, Switzerland and Germany. In France, 53 men including Algerian, French and Tunisian nationals suspected of links to ex-GIA commander Hassan Hattab were detained across 43 locations, including in Marseilles, Paris, Lyon and Corsica; 40 were released within two days. Five Algerians were arrested in Germany after raids across several cities, ten in Belgium, two in Switzerland, six in Italy, and many more detained. The French Interior Minister, Jean-Pierre Chevènement, said on French television after the arrests that investigators had found evidence of plots to attack the World Cup. Islamist paraphernalia and $150,000 in cash were found during the raids, but no explosives or arms. 24 people were taken to trial, of which eight were convicted. Some police sources have said that a goal of the May raids was to crush GIA support networks. According to one counterterrorism official, the resort to mass arrests during this period which included several other cases such as those of the "Chalabi network" reflected the need for intelligence about radical Islamist networks. According to a counter-terrorism magistrate, Jean-Louis Bruguière, the May raids were a preventive measure to protect the tournament.

== Plot and aftermath ==
The plot involved terrorists infiltrating the Stade Vélodrome in Marseille as stadium crew, in order to attack English players and spectators during the England–Tunisia match on 15 June. Terrorists had reportedly planned to blow up the England substitute bench (targeting youngsters David Beckham and Michael Owen), shoot English players and throw grenades into the stands. Other terrorists were then to storm the United States national team's hotel in Paris and attack American players watching the game there. The attacks would be followed by the hijacking of an aircraft by another group of terrorists to be crashed into the Civaux Nuclear Power Plant near Poitiers, causing a nuclear meltdown.

The details, and even existence, of the plot were kept secret from managers, players and the media, but were known to security services including The Football Association staff. In 2009, the England manager in 1998, Glenn Hoddle, revealed that he had only been informed of the plot "years later", while the FA's Director of Communications during 1998, David Davies, said that he had been informed of the plot before the match by the FA's Head of Security, Brian Hayes. The match was otherwise marred by supporter riots in Marseille, with British vehicles being bricked while bottles were thrown across the streets, causing police to use tear gas as large numbers of supporters were injured and arrested.

Although organised by GIA operatives, the plot reportedly had the backing and support of al-Qaeda leader Osama bin Laden. Although bin Laden had a rented place in the stands of Arsenal Football Club, he wanted to destroy English football. Bin Laden funded and assisted in the development of the murder plan, promised to provide additional financial support for implementation and weapons, and participated in the training of key GIA individuals at an al-Qaeda training camp. According to the bin Laden biographer, Yossef Bodansky, the World Cup plot being foiled was one of the reasons for "dormant terrorist networks" eventually responsible for the August 1998 United States embassy bombings being "reactivated".

A terror plot against the UEFA Euro 2000 was discovered after Dutch intelligence services intercepted calls made between GIA operatives from inside French prisons. Three men were detained in French prisons as a result of the plot, and three were subsequently arrested in the Netherlands. One of the French prisoners detained for the plot was Adel Mechat, who served six years in prison after having been arrested in Germany and extradited to France as part of the 1998 World Cup raids.

On the night before the first-ever football match between France and Algeria in October 2001, police seized explosives and arrested four Islamist militants suspected of having targeted the game after a phone call had been intercepted with warnings to stay away from the Stade de France. Other items retrieved included bulletproof vests and explosives manuals. The match itself was marred with controversy and was eventually stopped with 15 minutes playing time left after Algerian fans stormed the field.

== Bibliography ==
- Robinson, Adam (2002). Terror on the Pitch: How Bin Laden Targeted Beckham and the England Football Team. Mainstream Publishing. ISBN 978-1840186130.
