= Farid Melouk =

Convicted terrorist (born 1965)

Farid Melouk (born 14 May 1965) is a French-Algerian former member of the Armed Islamic Group (GIA) and convicted terrorist, known for his central role in jihadist networks.

Born in Lyon, France, he was the original suspect of a terror plot against the 1998 FIFA World Cup, after having been sentenced in absentia to 7 years in prison in France for his connection to the 1995 Paris Métro and RER bombings. After the 1995 charge, he went abroad and spent time in countries including Afghanistan and Croatia. After being arrested in an anti-terrorism police raid in Belgium in March 1998 in connection with the World Cup terror plot, he was sentenced to 9 years in prison in Belgium for charges including attempted murder. He was extradited to France in 2004, and released in 2009.

Melouk has been described as a "jihadist address book" for his extensive connections to jihadist and terrorists. During his time in prison, he befriended convicted terrorist Djamel Beghal, and in 2010 appeared in photographs alongside Beghal, as well as Chérif Kouachi, one of the perpetrators of the Charlie Hebdo shooting in January 2015. Melouk left France with his wife and children for Syria in October 2012, and appeared in photographs alongside Abdelhamid Abaaoud, the mastermind of the November 2015 Paris attacks. His extensive networks and suspected role in jihadist recruiting has led him to become a priority target for French anti-terrorism.
