= Chalabi network =

French Islamist network

The "Chalabi network" was the name given to a French Islamist network led by Mohamed Chalabi that supported the Armed Islamic Group (GIA) during the Algerian Civil War in the 1990s. A total of 138 suspected members of the group were subject to a controversial mass trial that took place from September 1998 to January 1999 following police raids in 1994 and 1995, with charges of "criminal association with a terrorist enterprise"; in the end 87 people were convicted.

== Arrests and trial ==
The 138 suspects tried in 1998 were arrested in two mass-arrests, the first in November 1994 when 93 people were arrested in a single day, and on 25 June 1995 when 131 people were arrested in five different cities across France. The highly controversial trial was held in a prison gymnasium on the outskirts of Paris because of a lack of space in the central court house. 120 lawyers and 300 police took part in the trial which was described as the largest in France in 50 years. The trial was heavily criticised by civil rights activists and newspapers, and most defence lawyers walked out of the trial on the first day. Most of the trial consisted of the reading of a 600-page summary of the 50,000-page indictment.

A total of 87 suspects were convicted in the trial that concluded in January 1999; the three prime defendants, including the presumed ringleader Mohamed Chalabi, Mohamed Kerrouche and Mourad Tacine, received sentences of eight years in prison to be followed by permanent expulsion from France to Algeria for collecting weapons, money and counterfeit documents on behalf of Muslim fundamentalists fighting to overthrow the Algerian government.

== See also ==
- 1995 France bombings
- 1998 World Cup terror plot
