= Double Chooz =

Neutrino oscillation experiment

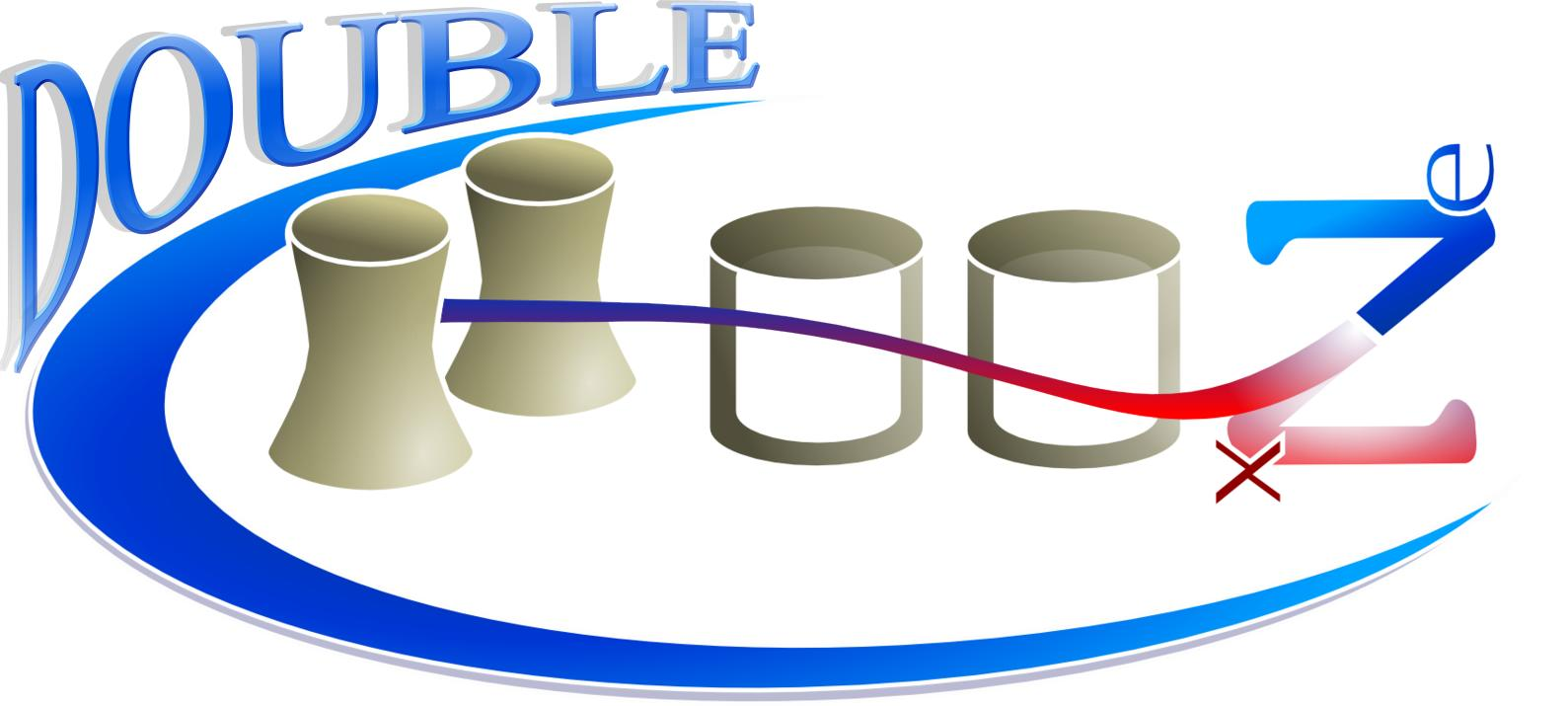
The Double Chooz logo

Double Chooz was a short-baseline neutrino oscillation experiment in Chooz, France. Its goal was to measure or set a limit on the θ_{13} mixing angle, a neutrino oscillation parameter responsible for changing electron neutrinos into other neutrinos. The experiment used the Chooz Nuclear Power Plant reactors as a neutrino source and measured the flux of neutrinos from them. To accomplish this, Double Chooz had a set of two detectors situated 400 meters and 1050 meters from the reactors. Double Chooz was a successor to the Chooz experiment; one of its detectors occupies the same site as its predecessor. Until January 2015 all data had been collected using only the far detector. The near detector was completed in September 2014, after construction delays, and started taking data at the beginning of 2015. Both detectors stopped taking data in late December 2017.

== Detector design ==
Double Chooz used two identical gadolinium-doped liquid scintillator detectors placed in vicinity of two 4.25 GW thermal power reactors to measure antineutrino disappearance. The two detectors were referred to as "near", 400 meters from the reactor; and "far", 1,050 meters from the reactor. The far detector was placed inside a hill such that there was a 300 meters of water equivalent of shielding from cosmic muons. The detector itself was a calorimetric liquid scintillator consisting of four concentric cylindrical vessels.

=== Neutrino target and γ-catcher ===
The innermost vessel was made of acrylic plastic and had a diameter of 230 cm, a height of 245.8 cm, and a thickness of 0.8 cm. This chamber was filled with 10,000 liters of gadolinium (Gd) loaded (1 gram/liter) liquid scintillator; it was the neutrino target. The next layer out was the γ-catcher. It surrounded the neutrino target with a 55 cm thick layer of Gd-free liquid scintillator. The casing for the γ-catcher was 12 cm thick and made of the same material as the neutrino catcher. The materials were chosen so that both of these vessels are transparent to photons with a wavelength greater than 400 nm.

=== Buffer vessel and PMTs ===
The buffer vessel was made of stainless steel 304L with dimensions of 552.2 cm wide by 568.0 cm tall and 0.3 cm thick. The remainder of the interior space that wasn't occupied by the acrylic double vessel was filled with a non-scintillating mineral oil. On the inner surface of the buffer vessel were 390 10-inch photomultiplier tubes. The purpose of the buffer layer was to shield from radioactivity in the PMTs and the surrounding rock. These two layers in addition to the neutrino target and γ-catcher were collectively referred to as the "inner detector."

=== Inner and outer vetos ===
The inner veto surrounded the buffer vessel with a 50 cm thick layer of scintillating mineral oil. In addition, it had 78 8-inch PMTs distributed on the top, bottom and sides. This inner veto layer served as an active veto layer for muons and fast neutrons. The surrounding 15 cm thick steel casing further served to shield against external γ-rays. The outer veto covered the top of the detector tank. It consisted of strips with a 5 cm x 1 cm cross section laid in orthogonal directions.

=== Data collection ===
Signals from the inner detector and the inner veto were recorded by 8-bit flash ADC electronics with a sampling rate of 500 MHz. The trigger threshold for the detectors was set to 350 keV, much lower than the 1.02 MeV expected of the electron anti-neutrinos.

For several years Double Chooz had operated with only the far detector and had used models such as Bugey4 to calculate the expected flux.

== Experimental techniques ==
=== Neutrino mixing ===
Neutrinos are electrically neutral, extremely light particles that only interact weakly, meaning they can travel vast distances without ever being noticed. One of the properties of neutrinos is that as the propagate they have a chance to oscillate from one flavor ($e, \mu, \tau$) to another, and this is the principle under which the experiment operates. The goal of Double Chooz is to more tightly constrain the value for the $\theta_{13}$ mixing angle.

The Chooz experiment, performed in the 1990s, found that the $\theta_{13}$ mixing angle is constrained by

$$\sin^2 (2\theta_{13}) < 0.2$$

which was the best experimental upper limit for over a decade. The goal of the Double Chooz experiment is to continue to explore the $\theta_{13}$ angle by probing an even smaller region

$$0.03 < \sin^2 (2\theta_{13}) < 0.2$$

Observations of the mixing angle are accomplished by observing the $\bar{\nu}_{e}$ flux that comes off of the reactors during their fission reactions. Because one of the neutrino mass-squared differences is much smaller than the other, the Double Chooz experiment only needs to consider a two-flavor oscillation. In the two-flavor model the survival probability of any given neutrino is modelled by

$$P= 1 - \sin^{2}(2\theta_{13})\, \sin^{2} \left(\frac{1.27\Delta m^2_{31} L}{E_{\nu}}\right)\quad \mathrm{(in\; natural\; units).}$$

Here $L$ is the length in meters the neutrino has travelled and $E_{\nu}$ is the energy of the $\bar{\nu}_{e}$ particle. From this the value of the mixing angle can be measured from the oscillation amplitude in reactor neutrino oscillations.

=== Observations ===
The neutrinos from the reactor are observed via the inverse beta decay (IBD) process

$\bar{\nu}_e + p \to e^+ + n.$

Since there are backgrounds to consider, candidates for (IBD) are determined by the following: visible energy from the prompt signal must be between 0.5 and 20 MeV; the delayed signal must have an energy between 4 and 10 MeV; the time difference between those two signals must be between 0.5 and 150 microseconds; the distance between the vertices of the two signals should be less than 100 cm; and no other signals (except for the delayed signal) are found 200 microseconds before or 600 microseconds after the prompt signal. Detection of the prompt signal has reached nearly 100% efficiency, however it is not as easy to detect the delayed signal due to issues such as Gd-concentration and neutron scattering models.

== Results ==
=== Mixing angle ===
In November 2011, first results of the experiment, using 228 days of data, were presented at the LowNu conference in Seoul, hinting at a non-zero value of θ_{13}, followed by an article submitted to arXiv in December 2011. In the PRL article (published in 2012), the zero θ_{13} oscillation hypothesis was excluded at 2.9 sigma by combining the Double Chooz experiment disappearance data and the T2K experiment appearance data, that had been released only some months before. This result became both the most important evidence at the time and the first accurate measurement of the amplitude of θ_{13}. Shortly after, the Daya Bay experiment provided its confirming measurement with ≥5σ significance. The central values of both Double Chooz and Daya Bay experiments were in excellent agreement and has remained so (within ≤2σ) so far. A similar analysis combination technique as done by the Double Chooz experiment in 2012 has been employed by the T2K experiment to yield the first constraints on the non-zero CP-violation phase in 2020.

Neutron capture on hydrogen was used to produce independent data, which was analysed to yield a separate measurement in 2013:

$$\sin^2 (2\theta_{13}) = 0.097\pm 0.034 \, \mathrm{(stat)} \pm 0.034\, \mathrm{(syst)}.$$

Using reactor-off data, a background-independent measurement was published July 2014 in Physics Letters B:

$$\sin^2 (2\theta_{13}) = 0.102 \pm 0.028 \, \mathrm{(stat)} \pm 0.033\, \mathrm{(syst)}.$$

An improved measurement with reduced background and systematic uncertainties after 467.90 days of data was published in the Journal of High Energy Physics in 2014:

$$\sin^2 (2\theta_{13}) =  0.090^{+0.032}_{-0.029}.$$

=== Other results ===
Double Chooz was able to identify positronium formation in their detector, which delays positron annihilation and distorts the scintillation signal. A tagging algorithm was developed that could be used in neutrino detectors for improved background rejection, which was similarly done by Borexino for cosmogenic ^{11}C background. An ortho-positronium lifetime of 3.68±0.15 ns was measured, compatible with other dedicated setups.

Limits on Lorentz violation parameters were also set.

== Bibliography ==
- Apollonio, M.; et al. (2003). "Search for neutrino oscillations on a long base-line at the CHOOZ nuclear power station". The European Physical Journal C. 27 (3): 331–374. arXiv:hep-ex/0301017. Bibcode:2003EPJC...27..331A. doi:10.1140/epjc/s2002-01127-9. S2CID 14226312.
- Ardellier, F.; et al. (2006). "Double Chooz: A Search for the Neutrino Mixing Angle θ_{13}". arXiv:hep-ex/0606025.
- Huber, P.; et al. (2006). "From Double Chooz to Triple Chooz — Neutrino Physics at the Chooz Reactor Complex". Journal of High Energy Physics. 0605 (72): 072. arXiv:hep-ph/0601266. Bibcode:2006JHEP...05..072H. doi:10.1088/1126-6708/2006/05/072. S2CID 13576581.
