= Chooz Nuclear Power Plant =

French nuclear power plant

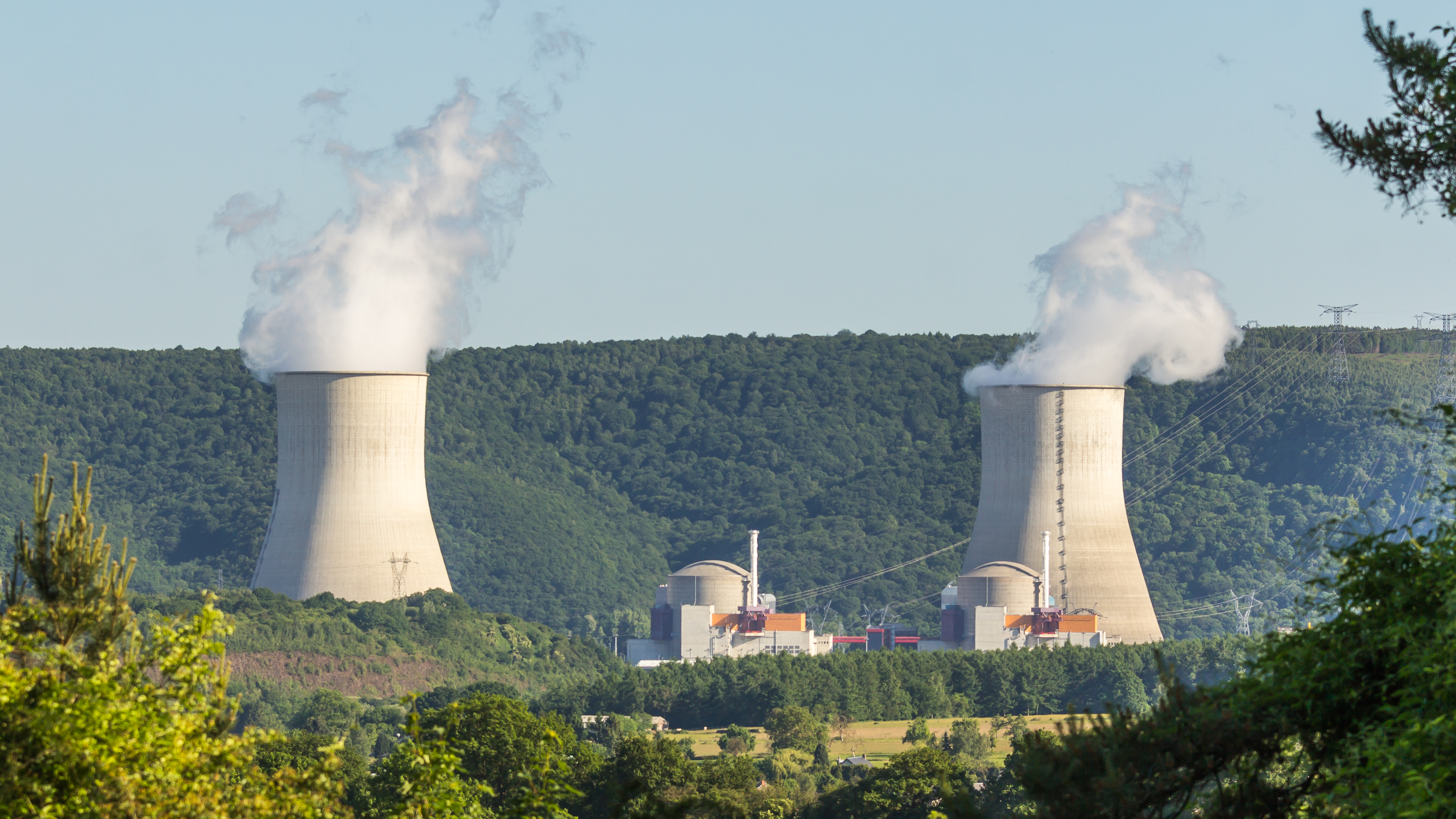
- Official name: Centrale Nucléaire de Chooz
- Country: France
- Location: Chooz, Ardennes
- Coordinates: 50°5′24″N 4°47′22″E
- Status: Operational
- Construction began: 1960
- Commission date: April 15, 1967
- Decommission date: 1991 (Chooz A)
- Operator: EDF

Nuclear power station
- Reactor type: PWR
- Reactor supplier: Framatome
- Cooling towers: 2 × Natural Draft
- Cooling source: Meuse River

Power generation
- Units operational: 2 × 1560 MW
- Make and model: Alstom
- Units decommissioned: 1 × 320 MW
- Nameplate capacity: 3120 MW
- Capacity factor: 70.6%
- Annual net output: 19,306 GW·h

External links
- Website: www.edf.fr/120786i/Accueil-fr/EDF-Nos-Energies/-nucleaire/les-centrales-nucleaires/Chooz/presentation.html
- Commons: Related media on Commons

The Chooz Nuclear Power Station (French: Centrale nucléaire de Chooz) lies in the municipality of Chooz in the Ardennes department, France, on the Meuse River in a panhandle protruding into Belgium, between the French city of Charleville-Mézières and the Belgian municipality of Dinant, near the comune of Givet.

Three nuclear reactors have been built on the site, Chooz A, Chooz B1 and Chooz B2. Chooz A was permanently shutdown in 1991 and has been undergoing the decommissioning process since 2007.

As of 2022, the plant employed around 1200 operators.

The Chooz reactors were a source of neutrinos for the Chooz neutrino oscillation experiment; a new experiment, Double Chooz, was also operating nearby.

== Chooz A ==
Chooz A was an early pressurized water reactor (PWR) design by Westinghouse, built and operated by French (EDF) and Belgian (SENA) grid operators. It was shut down in 1991 after an operational life of 22 years. The containment building of this unit was underground.

Decommissioning was authorised in 2007. After preliminary work, decommissioning of the reactor pressure vessel began in 2016. As of 2022, vessel’s internal equipment was being dismantled under water.

== Chooz B1 and B2 ==
Two units of the N4 reactor design are in operation, Chooz B1 and Chooz B2. Designed for a net power output of 1450 MWe, power was uprated to 1500 MWe in 2003. This was the highest nameplate capacity for any reactor design worldwide until the Taishan Nuclear Power Plant in China began operation. The Taishan plant is an EPR design reactor with a net power output of greater than 1,600 MWe per reactor.

== Events ==
In 1968, following a control rod blockage, technicians realised that screws in mechanical parts inside the Chooz A reactor vessel had failed, without, however, compromising the integrity of the vessel itself.

On 2 February 2018, access to the power plant was temporarily restricted after traces of solvent containing chemical elements commonly identified in explosive detection tests were found on a delivery lorry. The driver was detained as a precaution, and bomb disposal experts were called to the site. Access was restored later the same day after specialists confirmed that there was no risk to the facility or its personnel.

In 2018, ASN published an "incident report" detected in 2015 and 2016 concerning the Chooz and Civaux power plant, once repairs had been carried out.

== Reactors ==
Unit	Type	Net power	Total power	Construction start	Construction finish	Commercial operation	Shut down
Chooz - A (Ardennes)	PWR	310 MW	320 MW	01/01/1962	03/04/1967	15/04/1967	30/10/1991
Chooz - B 1	PWR	1500 MW	1560 MW	01/01/1984	30/08/1996	15/05/2000	
Chooz - B 2	PWR	1500 MW	1560 MW	31/12/1985	10/04/1997	29/09/2000	
