= Chooz, Ardennes =

Chooz
- Commune
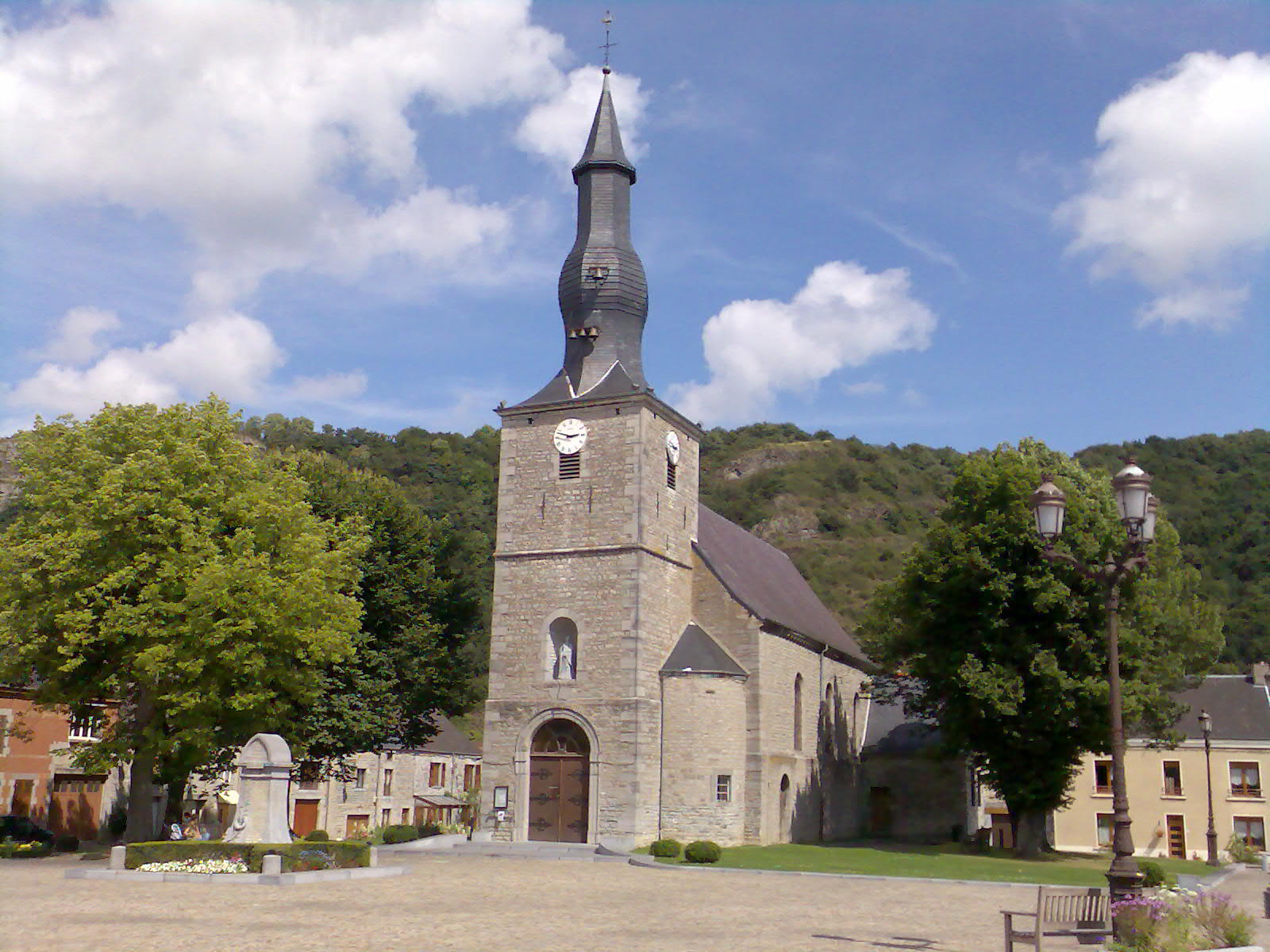
- The church in Chooz
- Location of Chooz
- Location within France Location within Grand Est
- Coordinates: 50°06′15″N 4°48′28″E
- Country: France
- Region: Grand Est
- Department: Ardennes
- Arrondissement: Charleville-Mézières
- Canton: Givet
- Intercommunality: Ardenne Rives de Meuse

Government
  - Mayor (2020–2026): Jean-Marie Barreda
- Area^{1}: 13.08 km^{2} (5.05 sq mi)
- Elevation: 150 m (490 ft)
- Population (2023): 825
  - Density: 63.1/km^{2} (163/sq mi)
- Time zone: UTC+01:00 (CET)
  - Summer (DST): UTC+02:00 (CEST)
- INSEE/Postal code: 08122 /08600
- ^{1} French Land Register data, which excludes lakes, ponds, glaciers > 1 km^{2} (0.386 sq mi or 247 acres) and river estuaries.

Chooz (French pronunciation: [ʃo]) is a commune in the Ardennes department in northern France.

The Chooz Nuclear Power Plant is located in Chooz, as are the associated Chooz and Double Chooz neutrino oscillation experiments. The Pointe de Givet National Nature Reserve is also partly located on the commune.

== Population ==
Historical population
Year	Pop.	±% p.a.
1968	655	—
1975	809	+3.06%
1982	802	−0.12%
1990	803	+0.02%
1999	749	−0.77%
2007	764	+0.25%
2012	762	−0.05%
2017	745	−0.45%
2023	825	+1.71%
Source: INSEE

== See also ==
- Communes of the Ardennes department
