= Chooz (experiment) =

Neutrino oscillation experiment in France

Chooz (French pronunciation: [ʃo]) was a short baseline neutrino oscillation experiment in Chooz, France. Its major result was setting limits on the neutrino oscillation parameters responsible for changing electron neutrinos into other neutrinos. Specifically, it found that sin^{2}(2θ_{13}) < 0.17 for large δm^{2} and δm^{2} > 8×10^{−4} eV^{2} for maximal mixing. The results were published in 1999.

The Double Chooz experiment took data using the same lab space until 2017.

== Neutrino source ==
Chooz used neutrinos from two pressurized water reactors, which provided a >99.999% ν̅_{e} source. The average neutrino energy was approximately 3 MeV, and the detector was roughly 1000 m from the reactor. The intensity was measured using both the heat balance and neutron output of the reactor, and was known to be better than 2%. Detailed modeling of the reactor cores was used to predict both the intensity and energy spectrum of the neutrinos as a function of time. Neutrinos were observed via the inverse beta decay reaction (p + ν̅_{e} → n + e^{+}).

== Detector ==
The Chooz detector was underground, with a 300- meter water equivalent overburden to reduce cosmic ray backgrounds. The detector itself was a cylinder 5.5 m in diameter and 5.5 m tall. The detector was composed of three regions. The innermost region (region I) contained 5 tons of scintillator doped with gadolinium in a Plexiglas container. The gadolinium quickly captured the neutrons produced in the inverse beta decay. The second region (region II) contained 17 tons of undoped scintillator to capture the electromagnetic energy from the inverse beta decay (≈99%) and the photons from the neutron capture in the Gd (>95%). The outer surface of region II contained 192 inward facing photomultiplier tubes (PMT) held in an opaque plastic structure.

The outermost region (region III) contained ninety tons of the same undoped scintillator as region II and vetoed cosmic ray events using 48 PMTs.

The Plexiglas layer between regions I and II was clear, to allow scintillation light from region I to be observed by the PMTs in region II. The inner surface of the region II container was painted black to avoid reflections, which would degrade position measurements. The outer surface of the region II container and the inner surface of the region III container were painted white to maximize the veto signals.

== Data sample ==
Chooz collected data for a total of 8210 hours: 3420 hours with neither reactor running, 3250 hours with one reactor running, and 1540 hours with both reactors running. A total of 2991 neutrino candidates were observed during this period, with 287 of the candidates occurring during the reactor off periods. The correlated background was 1.01 events per day, and the uncorrelated background was 0.42 events per day. The neutrino yield was also studied as a function of reactor power, fuel burnup, and for each reactor separately.

The energy spectrum of the positrons and the calculated direction of the incoming neutrino were also calculated. All distributions agreed with predictions.

== Neutrino oscillation searches ==
Three analysis techniques were used to search for neutrino oscillations. The most powerful method used a global χ^{2} fit of seven positron energy bins for each reactor, for a total of fourteen bins. The χ^{2} was calculated for various (θ, δm^{2}) combinations. The full 14 × 14 covariance matrix was used to account for correlations among the bins. The χ^{2} statistic also includes a term for the overall neutrino normalization (with an uncertainty of 2.7%) and a term for the energy calibration (with an uncertainty of 1.1%). The global minimum, with a χ^{2} probability of 96%, corresponds to sin^{2}(2θ) = 0.23, δm^{2} = 8.1×10^{−4} eV^{2}, overall neutrino normalization = 1.012, and energy scale = 1.006. The no-oscillation hypothesis is also has a high χ^{2} probability of 93%, corresponding to an overall neutrino normalization = 1.008 and energy scale = 1.011.

== Interpretation of results ==
The Chooz results place limits on the PMNS matrix element U_{e3}^{2}. Two possibilities exist, U_{e3}^{2} < 0.03 or U_{e3}^{2} > 0.97. The solar neutrino problem excludes the second inequality, therefore U_{e3}^{2} is restricted to small values. The CHOOZ data also indicate a strong preference for the ν_{μ} → ν_{τ} maximum mixing hypothesis.

== Note on naming ==
The Chooz collaboration is not consistent in its capitalization. The experiment sometimes appears as Chooz and sometimes as CHOOZ. However, it is not an acronym.
