= GE Offshore Wind =

Wind turbine manufacturer

- Industry: Wind turbines
- Predecessor: Alstom Wind (2010–2015); Alstom Ecotècnia (2007–2010); Ecotècnia S.c.c.l. (1981–2007)
- Founded: 1981
- Headquarters: Nantes, France
- Key people: Jan Kjærsgaard (CEO)
- Products: Alstom Haliade 150, GE Haliade-X
- Owner: GE Vernova

GE Offshore Wind is a joint venture with Alstom and a subsidiary of GE Vernova, created in 2015 when most of Alstom's electrical power and generation assets were acquired by General Electric. GE's stake in the joint venture is 50% plus 1 share.

Formerly known as Alstom Wind, originally Alstom Ecotècnia, the company was the wind power company of energy infrastructure company Alstom, within its 'Power' operating division, from 2010 to 2015. The company originated as Ecotècnia S.c.c.l., a Spanish wind power equipment manufacturing and installation company established in 1981, acquired by Alstom 2007 for €350 million.

The subsidiary's main product is the 14MW Haliade-X offshore wind turbine, amongst the most powerful on Earth.

== History ==
=== Ecotècnia, 1987-2007 ===
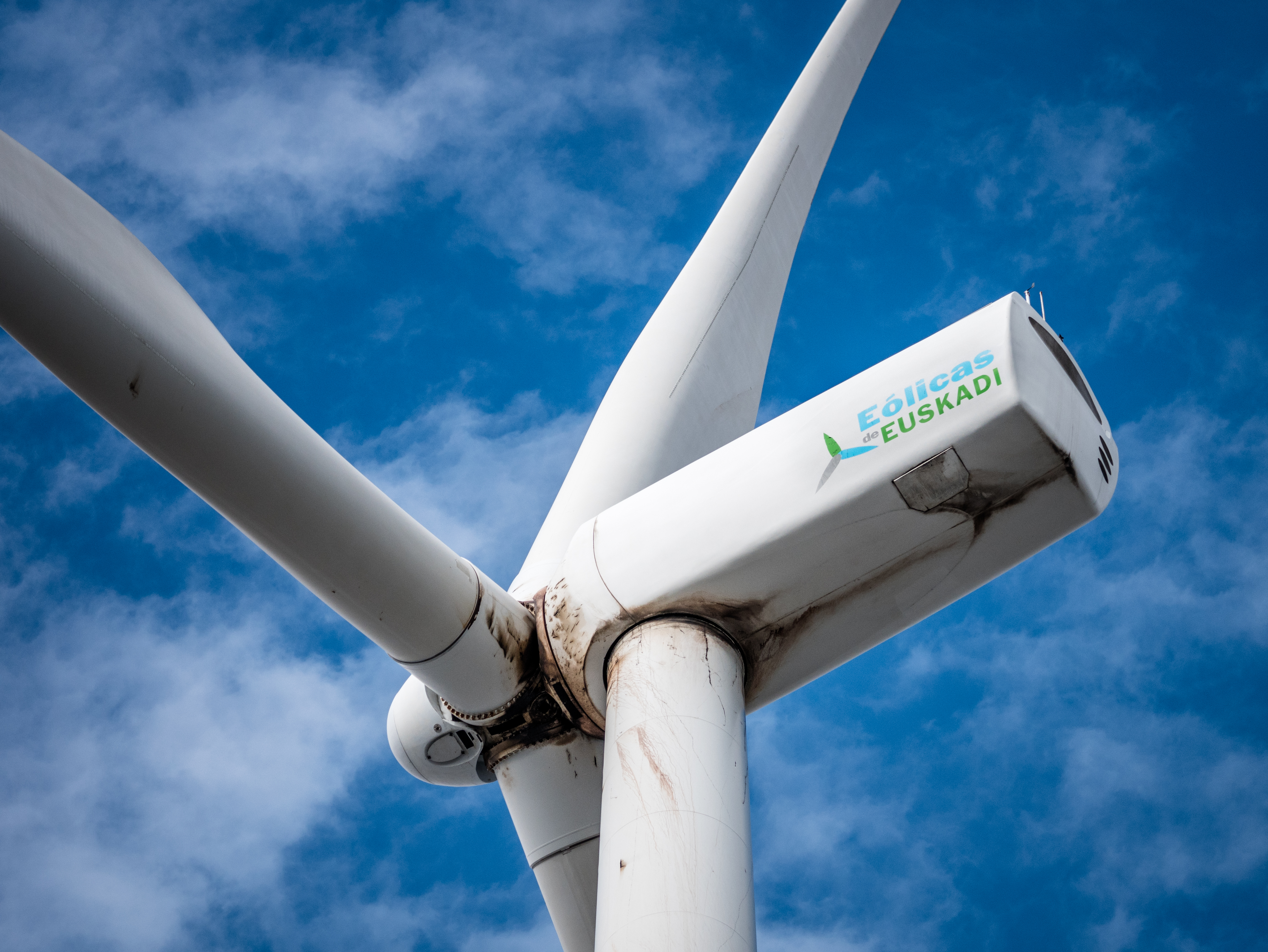
Detail of a wind turbine Alstom-Ecotècnica Eco80 in the Spanish Basque Country

Ecotècnia was a manufacturer and installer of wind turbines established in 1981, headquartered in Barcelona, Spain. In 1999 it became part of the Basque-based cooperative Mondragon Corporation.

The company's first wind generator was a 30 kW machine, developed by 1984 with funding assistance from the Spanish Science Ministry. In 1991 the company developed a 150 kW machine, and in 1992 won its first commercial project - for fifty 150 kW turbines at Tarifa, Spain. The particular demands of installing wind turbines in mountainous regions in Spain which included poor road access and blustery (high turbulence) conditions led to specific design features of Ecotècnia's turbines - including a modular construction of the turbine (three components: rotor and shaft; mainframe and yaw system; and the drive train - each less than 30t), as well as isolation of the gearbox from the main drive, reducing non-torque gearbox loads.

In the first half of the 1990s the company installed wind farms using its ECO20 150 kW model, from 1995 to 2000 the company's primary models were the ECO44 (640 kW) and ECO48 (750 kW) models. After 2003 most of the company's installations used its 1.67MW IEC 61400 class II ECO74, and class IIIA ECO80, three blade turbine models; both typically used a mechanically isolated Winergy AG PEAB 4390.2 planetary gearbox driving a doubly fed induction generator (typically ABB, Siemens, Winergy sourced) with IGBT inverter control, driven by individually pitch controlled blades manufactured by LM Wind Power.

The majority of its installations were in Spain, with approximately 10% in other countries including Portugal, France, Italy as well as installations in Japan and India.

In 2005 the company's estimate world market share (by installed capacity) was 2.1%. By 2007 the company had installed over wind farms with over 1GW total of rate power; the company had increased the power output of its wind turbine offering from 30 kW in 1984 to 1.67MW by 2003.

In mid 2007 Alstom acquired Ecotècnia for 350 million euro. By late 2007 the company employed over 800 people, with sales of approximately €400 million pa., and operated wind turbine assembly plants in Somozas and Buñuel, other sites at Rio del Pozo (control panels) and Coreses (tower manufacturing). The company also manufactured small scale autonomous energy systems for isolated locations (tradename 'CICLOPS') comprising windgenerator (10 kW), photovoltaic solar source (2 to 10 kW), generator, battery and inverter, and was active in small scale photovoltaic cell installation (factory Pla de Santa Maria.).

=== Alstom Wind, 2007-2015 ===
The first ECO100 3 MW wind turbine was formally inaugurated at the Vieux Moulin wind farm (Pithiviers, Paris, France) 1 October 2009.

The company was renamed Alstom Wind S.L. in April 2010.

In 2010 Alstom began construction of a turbine nacelle factory in Amarillo, USA, completed in mid 2011. In November 2011 a 300MW per year capacity manufacturing plant in Camaçari near Salvador, Bahia, Brazil was formally opened.

In March 2012 a prototype of Alstom Haliade 150 6 MW offshore turbine was formally inaugurated; the turbine was developed for large scale offshore wind projects off the French coast; in January 2011 Alstom joined a consortium led by EDF Energies Nouvelles as turbine supplier (also including DONG Energy, Nass & Wind, WPD Offshore) to bid for proposed offshore wind farms in France of 6GW capacity. The Haliade 150 turbine was a development of the previous mechanically isolated transmission designs developed by Ecotècnia; (Note: The Haliade 150 design has separate main rotor and generator bearings, with torque transmitted from rotor to generator via a flexible coupling.) the gearbox driven electrically generator was omitted and replaced with a gearless direct drive permanent magnet synchronous generator designed for higher efficiency and greater reliability with fewer moving parts. The turbine uses 73.5m turbine blades from LM Wind Power.

In April 2012 the French state awarded an EDF/DONG Energy/Alstom consortium three contracts for offshore wind farms (Saint-Nazaire, Calvados/Courseulles-sur-Mer, Fécamp.) off the northwestern coast of France of total power 1.4 GW. As a result, Alstom confirmed that it would be constructing wind turbine factories at Cherbourg-en-Cotentin (Turbine blades in association with LM Power, wind turbine towers), and at Saint-Nazaire (Nacelles and generators) in the Montoir-de-Bretagne port area.

A 6 MW Haliade turbine began generating electricity in July 2012 during certification testing. The turbine's electrical generator was supplied by partner company, General Electric subsidiary GE Power Conversion (Converteam), who were also expected to establish a production plant in Saint Nazaire.

In late 2012 Alstom announced the intention to construct a wind turbine tower manufacturing facility in Canoas, Rio Grande do Sul, Brazil, on a site adjacent to an established Alstom power transmission factory. The plant was officially inaugurated in August 2013.

In February 2013 the company announced the cut of 35% of its workforce in Spain, due to a collapse in the Spanish wind market because of a change to governmental support for wind developments. (Note: Spanish governmental austerity measures led to subsidies for wind power ending c.2012. Quote: In January 2012 the newly appointed Spanish government announced a temporary suspension in the premium remuneration for renewable energy capacity. ... It's expected that this decision will simply stop the building of new wind in 2013. Support via Feed-in tariffs were to be replaced by subsidies encouraging capital investment, with only intrinsically profitable ventures supported.) The facilities at Somozas, Galicia (electrical equipment), and Zamora, Castille and Leon region (towers) were to close with electrical equipment production moved to the plant at Buñuel, Navarra. Total job losses were later reduced from 373 to 265.

A Haliade 150 turbine was installed at the Belwind wind farm in November 2013 for operational tests, at the time being one of the largest operational wind turbines in the world. (Note: An initial Haliade 150 turbine was installed onshore at Le Carnet, France for testing and certification in March 2012.)

In December 2014 the St. Nazaire nacelle and generator assembly factory was officially opened.

In early 2015 a wind turbine tower factory was opened in Jacobina, Bahia, Brazil; constructed as a joint venture (51%/49%) between Andrade Gutierrez and Alstom.

Initial orders for the company's Haliade wind turbine included 5 units for the Block Island Wind Farm (USA, March 2015); and 66 units for DEME for the Merkur offshore wind farm (Germany, July 2015).

In November 2015 most of Alstom's energy generation and transmission assets were bought by General Electric. The combined business under GE was named GE Power. The two parties also created three joint ventures, among them a hydro and offshore renewable business unit.

=== GE Power (offshore wind) (2016–) ===
In February 2016 the first of a series production of 300 permanent magnet wind generators was completed at the St. Nazaire factory. A long planned test period for the 6MW Haliade is expected to start in Spring 2016 at Østerild Wind Turbine Test Field.
