= Electricity sector in France =

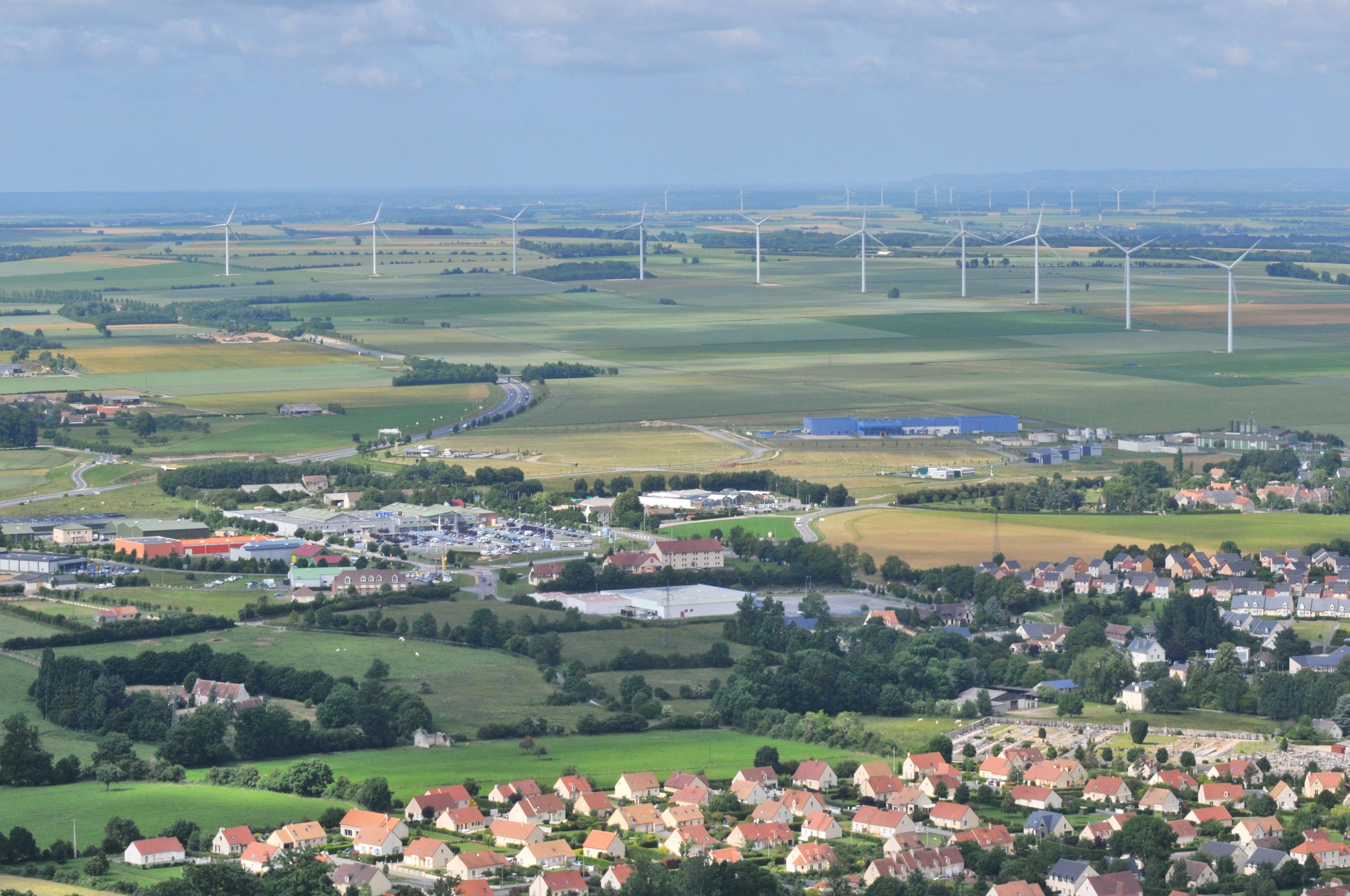

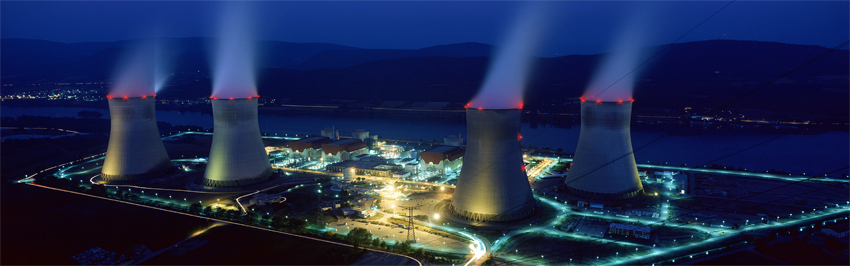
- Left: The Cattenom nuclear power station near Luxembourg; Right: Wind power in France; turbines in Lower Normandy; Bottom: The Cruas nuclear power plant at night.

Electricity sector of France
Data
- Installed capacity: 135 GW
- Production (2020): 537.7 TWh
- GHG emissions from electricity generation (2020): 57.3 gCO2/kWh

The electricity sector in France is dominated by its nuclear power, which accounted for 71.7% of total production in 2018, while renewables and fossil fuels accounted for 21.3% and 7.1%, respectively (compare to 72.3% nuclear, 17.8% renewables and 8.6% fossil fuels in 2016). France has the largest share of nuclear electricity in the world, and together with renewable energy supplies, this has helped its grid achieve very low carbon intensity.

France's electrical grid is part of the synchronous grid of Continental Europe and due to a historical oversupply of nuclear power it is the world's largest net exporter of electricity.

The French nuclear power sector is almost entirely owned by the French government. The electricity sector in France will evolve in the coming years partly based on objectives defined by the government in its Strategy for Energy and Climate and its National Low Carbon Strategy.

== Consumption ==
In 2008 consumption of electricity was on average 8,233 kWh/person. This corresponded to 110% of the EU15 average (7,409 kWh/person) and 91% of the OECD average (8,991 kWh/person).

== Electricity per person and by power source ==
Electricity per capita in France (kWh/ hab.)
	Use	Production	Export	Exp. %	Fossil	Nuclear	Nuc. %	Other RE*	Bio+waste	Wind	Non RE use*	RE %*
2004	8,204	9,203	999	12.2%	849	7,209	87.9%	1,061	83		7,060	13.9%
2005	8,215	9,176	961	11.7%	970	7,201	87.7%	924	81		7,210	12.2%
2006	8,140	9,041	901	11.1%	897	6,977	85.7%	1,083	85		6,972	14.3%
2008	8,233	8,984	751	9.1%	853	6,872	83.5%	1,168	91		6,974	15.3%
2009	7,951	8,351	400	5.0%	871	6,371	80.1%	897*	93	121*	6,840	14.0%
* Other RE is waterpower, solar and geothermal electricity and wind power until 2008 * Non RE use = use – production of renewable electricity * RE % = (production of RE / use) * 100% Note: European Union calculates the share of renewable energies in gross electrical consumption.

== Production ==
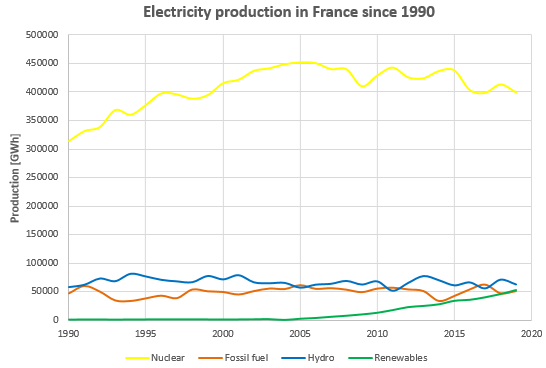
Production of electricity in France by source since 1990

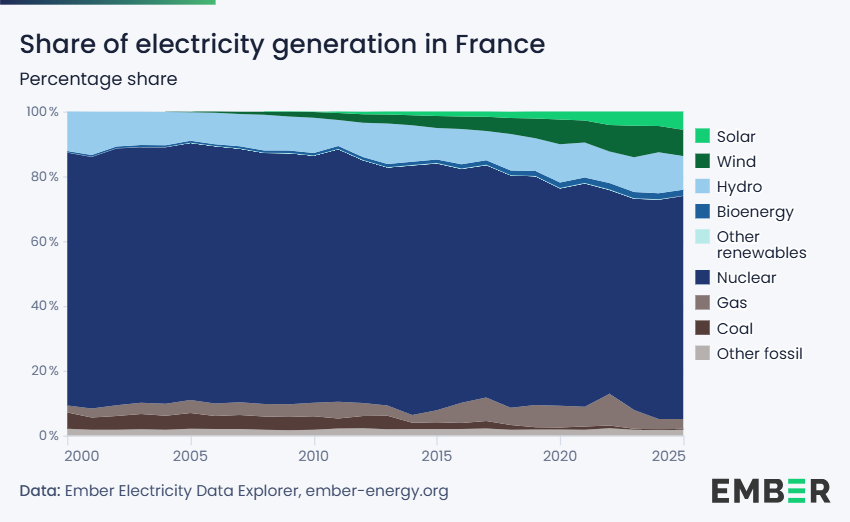
Electricity generation in France by source - percentage share

=== Mode of production ===
French gross production of electricity was 557 terawatt-hours (TWh) in 2014, slightly down from 570 and 567 TWh produced in 2008 and 2004, respectively. France is the world's 9th largest producer of electricity. France is also the world's second largest producer of nuclear electricity, behind the United States and ahead of Russia and Korea. In terms of nuclear's share on the total domestic electricity generation, France has by far the highest percentage portion of any country in the world (78.4% in 2014, also see chart "Electricity production by source").

Live production and consumption of electricity can be found on the following websites: RTE eco2mix and grid watch.

France installed capacity [GW] and production in 2020 [TWh]
	Installed capacity [GW]	Production [TWh]	Production share [%]
Nuclear	61.37	379.5	70.58
Hydropower	25.466	60.0	11.16
Wind power	17.391	34.1	6.34
Gas	12.529	38.6	7.18
Solar power	10.101	11.6	2.16
Coal	2.978	1.6	0.30
Oil	2.897	2.3	0.43
Bioenergies	2.16	9.9	1.84
Total	134.892	537.7	100

=== Nuclear power ===
France's nuclear power plants were installed as a response to the 1973 oil crisis, and are almost entirely owned by the French government and its electricity is sold to the government. According to Al Gore the degree of the government subsidy is difficult to ascertain because of a lack of transparencies in the finances of the operation.

The Commissariat à l’Énergie Atomique is the national research body for nuclear power in France, providing RnD and advice to exploiters. The Autorité de sûreté nucléaire is charged of controlling compliance of facilities with laws and regulations. Nuclear companies include EdF and Areva. Électricité de France (EdF) is the main electricity producer. Eurodif is the uranium enrichment plant. Areva NC (France) and Rio Tinto (UK) are the top uranium companies of the world.

In 2010, as part of the progressive liberalisation of the energy market under EU directives, France agreed the Accès régulé à l'électricité nucléaire historique (ARENH) regulations that allowed third party suppliers access up to about a quarter of France's pre-2011 nuclear generation capacity, at a fixed price of €42/MWh from 1 July 2011 until 31 December 2025.

France has the largest share of electricity from nuclear power in the world. According to the IEA 70.6% of its domestic electricity was generated by nuclear power in 2020. The second was Slovakia 53.1%, third Ukraine 51.2% and followed by Hungary 48%, Bulgaria 40.8%, Belgium 39.1%, Slovenia 37.8%, the Czech Republic 37.3%, Armenia 34.5% and Finland 33.9% France's nuclear reactors comprise 90 percent of EDFs capacity and so they are used in load-following mode and some reactors close at weekends because there is no market for the electricity. This means that the capacity factor is low by world standards, usually in the high seventies as a percentage, which is not an ideal economic situation for nuclear plants.

In terms of installed capacity and produced power in 2013 France was the second largest producer of nuclear energy in the world behind the United States. The installed nuclear capacity was 63.1 GW, and power production was 403.7 TWh.

France reprocesses its nuclear waste to retrieve plutonium and uranium for use as additional fuel. Fission products are stored in La Hague facility until a deep geological repository for high-level waste can be constructed. A repository for low-level and short-lived intermediate-level nuclear waste is already operational.

The European Pressurized Reactor (EPR) at Flamanville, the first new nuclear reactor to be built in France in 15 years, as of 2012 was expected to open in 2016 instead of the original starting date of 2012, with costs climbing to €8.5bn instead of the original estimate of €3.3bn. Further delays have since pushed the opening to 2024.

A number of nuclear power plants were forcibly shut in 2022 due to stress corrosion cracking on pipework providing primary cooling. This led to EDF to estimate a loss of 70 TWh of production (or around 13% of annual generation) for the year 2022 and a fall in profits of €19 billion.

=== Hydro power ===
Since 2010, the installed hydro electricity power capacity in France has remained stable at 25 GW and is expected to reach 25.7 GW by 2023. Its annual production however has fluctuated across the years going down to 50.8 TWh in 2011 from up to 77 TWh in 2013 which is a reflection of the use of hydroelectricity as a mean to help balance the gaps between load consumption and production. Its average load factor is 25% and in 2019 hydropower represented 12% of the production in France. In terms of installed capacity, France ranked 2nd in Europe after Norway (32 GW) and 10th in the world, China being the leader with 356 GW of hydropower installed in 2019.

=== Wind power ===
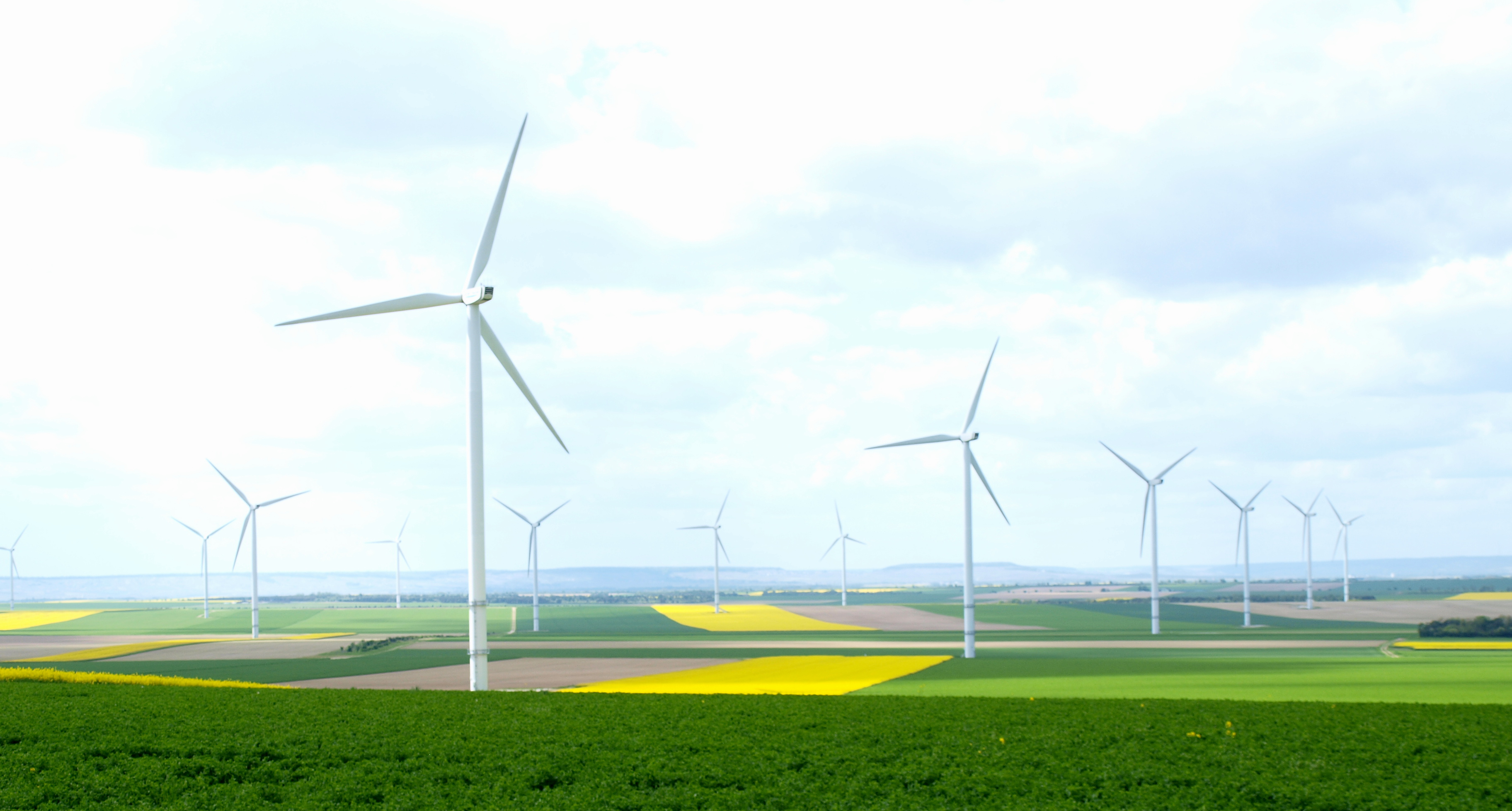
Wind farm in France.

Installed wind power in France was 17,391 MW at the end of 2020, representing 13% of the overall installed capacity of the country. The share of wind power was in average 8,78% of the electricity production during 2020 with a peak to 32,49% on 27 September 2020.The load factor is estimated at 25%.

In 2020 electric energy from wind power in France is still only produced in onshore wind farms. However, wind farms are under construction and the first offshore wind farms might be connected to the grid in 2021. The government in its strategy for Energy and Climate expect to install 2.4 GW of offshore wind power by 2023.

The tendering process to build France's first five offshore wind farms began on 25 January 2011 with four sites being awarded in 2012 (Fécamp, Calvados/Courseulles-sur-Mer, Saint-Nazaire, Saint-Brieuc) and Dieppe/Le Tréport not being awarded because the electricity selling price was too high. The second round of bidding was awarded in 2014 to the Areva / GDF Suez Consortium for the construction of two wind farms (Yeu-Noirmoutier & Dieppe/Le Tréport) and a total installed capacity of 1 GW. Finally, a third round started in 2016 with the site of Dunkirk being awarded in 2019 the consortium EDF Energies Nouvelles, Innogy and Enbridge.

EU and France Wind Energy Capacity (MW)
Year	France	EU-27	Year	France	EU-27
2021	-	-	2009	4,492	64,712
2020	17,391	-	2008	3,404	56,517
2019	16,646	196,636	2007	2,454	48,069
2018	15,307	181,583	2006	1,567	40,511
2017	13,757	170,859	2005	757	34,383
2016	12,065	143,307	2004	390	28,599
2015	10,293	131,545	2003	257	23,159
2014	9,296	118,950	2002	148	17,315
2013	8,254	105,696	2001	93	12,887
2012	7,564	93,957	2000	66	9,678
2011	6,640	84,074	1999	25	6,453
2010	5,970	74,767	1998	19	-

=== Solar power ===
France had 24 GW of photovoltaics installed capacity by 2023, surpassing the government's target of 18,200 MW to 20,200 MW of installed capacity by 2023.

France had 10571 MW of photovoltaics installed capacity in 2019, and generated 10,569 GWh. The European Union had a total installed capacity of 132,500 MW in 2019. France ranked fifth in terms of installed capacity after Spain (11,065 MW), UK (13,616 MW), Italy (22,666 MW) and Germany (45,784 MW).The average load factor is estimated at 13.7%.

France's largest solar park was the Cestas Solar Park near Bordeaux, commissioned on 1 December 2015 with a capacity of 300 MW. This solar park is owned by Neoen. The second largest completed solar park was the 115 MW Toul-Rosières Solar Park owned by EDF Renewables, a subsidiary of EDF Group.

As the number of hours with negative electricity prices increased from 352 in 2024, to 513 in 2025, France considers a change in feed-in tariff that promotes grid batteries. A 240 MW / 480 MWh battery in Cernay-lès-Reims opened in 2026.

France solar power installed capacity and production
Year	Installed Capacity [GW]	Production [GWh]
2024		
2023	24	
2019	10.571	10,569
2015	7.138	7,753
2010	1.044	620

=== Fossil fuels ===
France imported 22 megatonnes (Mt) of oil products for all purposes in 2014, making it Europe's largest, and the world's fourth largest net-importer of fossil oil, behind Japan (29 Mt), Singapore (26 Mt), and Indonesia (23 Mt). However, the majority of oil was used by the transportation sector (57% in 2011) and not for electricity generation.

=== Events ===
On 8 January 2021, RTE (French TSO) expected a high consumption of 88,000 MW and, with a planned production of 88,200 MW, requested its users to reduce their consumptions. In comparison, in 2019 the peak consumption in France was 88,500 MW and 96,600 MW in 2018. The production constraints probably came from a conjunction of several factors. A total of 12 reactors out of 56 were out for maintenance (delays due in part to coronavirus measures) and therefore during that day, the nuclear production was at ~51 GW despite an installed capacity of 61,370 GW. Wind power had a low production (~ 1 GW despite 17 GW of installed capacity). Finally, the price of electricity was high everywhere in Europe (~€100 /MWh, in comparison the average price of Electricity in France was €40.1 /MWh in November 2020), sign of a tension on the electricity production everywhere in Europe, meaning that the country could less rely on import from neighboring countries.

== International exchanges ==
French import–export balance of electricity in 2020 (TWh)

In 2019, France exported a total of 57 TWh of electricity with its neighbouring countries. Since 1990, each year, France roughly exports 10% of its annual production. Its annual exchange sold has always remained positive. The 2 GW HVDC INELEF powerline between Spain and France was opened in 2015, and France has imported some power from Spain.

France was the leader in the export of electricity in 2008: 48 TWh followed by Paraguay 46 TWh and Canada 32 TWh.

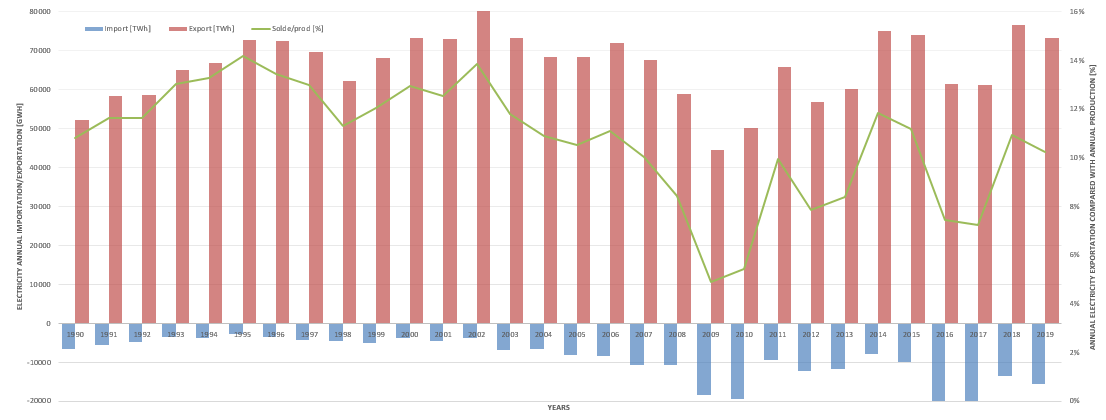
Exportation and importation of Electricity in France since 1990

== See also ==
- Energy in France
- Électricité de France
- Nuclear power in France
- Renewable energy in France
- Solar power in France
- Wind power in France
