= GE Renewable Energy =

French subsidiary of General Electric

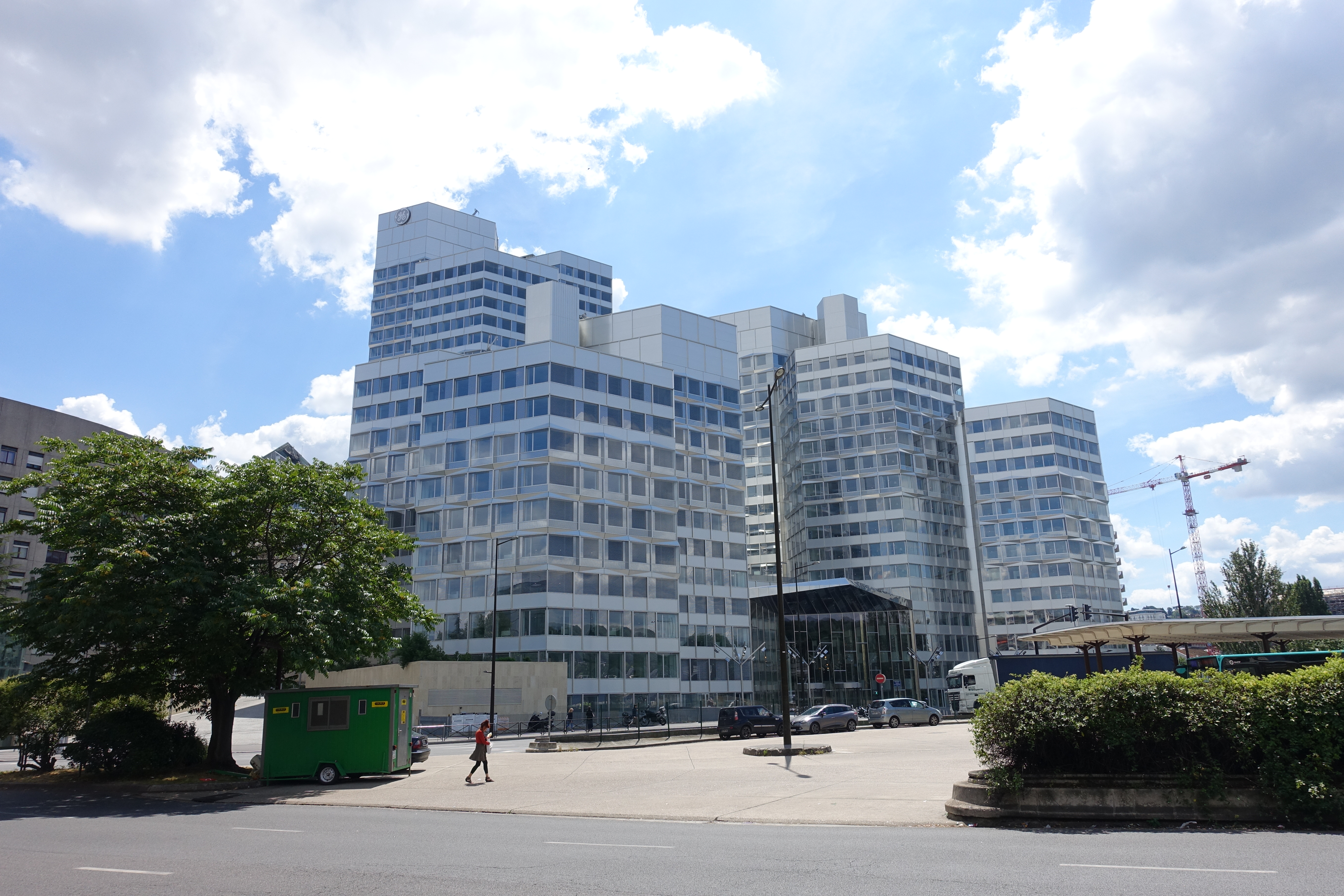
- GE Renewable Energy's headquarters in Boulogne-Billancourt pictured in 2016
- Type: Division
- Industry: Renewable energy
- Founded: 2015; 11 years ago
- Defunct: April 2, 2024; 2 years ago
- Fate: Spun off from General Electric to form GE Vernova
- Successor: GE Vernova
- Headquarters: Boulogne-Billancourt, France,
- Key people: Jérôme Pécresse (CEO)
- Products: Wind turbines
- Revenue: $15.7 billion (2021)
- Number of employees: 38,000 (2021)
- Parent: General Electric
- Divisions: GE Wind Energy (GE Onshore Wind and GE Offshore Wind); GM Grid Solutions Equipment and Services; GM Hydro Solutions; GM Hybrids Solutions; GM Steam Power
- Website: GE Renewable Energy

GE Renewable Energy was a manufacturing and services division of the American company General Electric. It was headquartered in Boulogne-Billancourt, near Paris, France, and focused on the production of energy systems that use renewable sources. Its products included wind (onshore and offshore), hydroelectric and solar (concentrated and photovoltaic) power generating facilities.

In 2024, GE Renewable Energy and GE Power merged to create GE Vernova, a company completely independent of General Electric, which ceased to exist as a conglomerate (refocusing on aerospace as GE Aerospace).

== History ==
GE Renewable Energy was created in 2015, combining the wind power assets GE purchased from Alstom with those previously owned by GE and operated under the Power & Water division. Upon the division's creation, the headquarters of GE Renewable Energy moved from Schenectady, New York to Paris, France, one condition of the Alstom purchase.

In 2021, a plan to split GE into three new public companies — GE Vernova, GE HealthCare, and GE Aerospace — was announced. GE Renewable Energy, along with GE Digital, GE Power, and GE Energy Financial Services, would come together as GE Vernova.

In 2023, GE announced that the spin-off of the three new companies was planned for the second quarter of 2024.

== Subdivisions ==
=== Wind ===
GE Wind was formed out of the assets of Enron Wind purchased in 2002, and subsequently expanded with the purchase of ScanWind in 2009. GE Wind expanded into offshore wind energy with the purchase of Alstom's energy generation assets (GE Offshore Wind, formerly Alstom Wind) in 2015.

GE Wind subsidiaries:

- GE Vernova's Onshore Wind Business, headquartered in Schenectady, New York
- GE Offshore Wind, headquartered in Nantes, France
- LM Wind Power, headquartered in Kolding, Denmark

=== Hydro ===
GE Renewable Energy Hydro, a sub-division of GE Renewable Energy, was involved in hydroelectricity generation. This included the design, manufacture, and installation of equipment for both gravity fed and pumped-storage power plants, and upgrades to existing hydroelectric plants.

GE Renewable Energy Hydro developed aerating turbines designed to increase the amount of oxygen in water passing through the turbines, to benefit the aquatic life downstream.

GE Renewable Energy Hydro's headquarters were in Grenoble, France.

=== Grid Solutions ===
GE Grid Solutions encompassed the high-voltage power grid equipment and engineering activities of Alstom's former subsidiary, Alstom Grid, which itself was spun off from the transmission business of Areva T&D, a former subsidiary of the French multinational Areva.

GE Grid Solutions's headquarters were in Boulogne-Billancourt, France.

== See also ==
- General Electric
- GE Offshore Wind (formerly Alstom Wind)
- GE Wind Energy
- LM Wind Power
- Alstom
