= GE Digital =

American company

- Type: Subsidiary
- Industry: Software
- Founded: September 14, 2015; 10 years ago
- Defunct: April 2, 2024; 2 years ago
- Fate: Spun off from General Electric to form GE Vernova
- Headquarters: San Ramon, California, U.S.
- Key people: Scott Reese (CEO); Colin Paris (CTO); Kathleen McCarthy (CHRO); Patric McElroy (Chief Software Engineer; Betsy Bingham (SVP Lean & Operations)
- Products: Advanced Distribution Management Solutions (ADMS); Advanced Energy Management System (AEMS); Advanced Market Management System (AMMS); Asset Performance Management (APM) Software; Data Historian Software; Digital Worker software; Geospatial Asset Management; Grid Analytics Software; HMI and SCADA Software; Manufacturing Execution Systems (MES); Operations Performance Management (OPM) Software; Remote Operations Software
- Brands: Predix; Proficy
- Services: Industrial Internet of Things (IIoT) Advisory Services; Remote Management and Diagnostic Services; Architecture and Solution Engineering Services
- Parent: General Electric
- Divisions: Manufacturing; Power Generation; Utilities & Telecom; Oil & Gas
- Website: www.ge.com/digital/

GE Digital was a subsidiary of American energy conglomerate GE Vernova. Headquartered in San Ramon, California, the company provides software and industrial internet of things (IIoT) services to industrial companies.

GE Digital's primary focus was to provide industrial software and services in four markets:

- Manufacturing applications serving discrete and process industries, as well as water utilities and economy-scale digital transformation projects
- Electric and telecommunications utilities
- Oil and gas industry and related adjacent markets (petrochemicals, chemicals manufacturing)
- Power generation (gas, steam, solar, wind, hydro and related balance of plant operations and service support);

== History ==
=== 1980–2010: Automation Software ===
- 1980: GE introduces the first Ethernet-enabled protection relay, a device that detects faults in systems.
- 1986: GE and FANUC enter into a joint venture to create GE Fanuc Automation Corporation, which manufactures programmable logic controllers—one of the fundamental buildings blocks of what's come to be known as the Industrial Internet of Things.
- 1995: GE Fanuc launch first HMI/SCADA on a 32-bit system (CIMPLICITY).
- 1996: Saturn Corp implement CIMPLICITY MMI, MES and SCADA solution.
- 1999: CIMPLICITY Saturn's implementation mention in Bill Gates book “Business @ the Speed of Thought: Succeeding in the Digital Economy”.
- 2001: GE Measurement and Control is established. It creates many types of sensors, instruments, and control systems for aerospace, the oil and gas industry, and power generation.
- 2002: GE Fanuc Automation Completes Acquisition of Intellution (iFIX products).
- 2003: GE Fanuc Automation Completes Acquisition of Mountain Systems (Historian and Plant Apps products).
- 2007: GE Fanuc Automation Corporation becomes GE Fanuc Intelligent Platforms.

=== 2011–2015: Internal industrial software development ===
- 2011: GE establishes a software Center of Excellence focused on developing industrial software.
- 2013: GE develops Predix, its platform for IIoT applications, designed to help GE businesses transform their operations.

=== 2015–2017: Launch of Predix ===
- 2016: GE launches Predix to the market, making its suite of applications available to industrial customers and partners globally. GE Digital also announced its acquisition of ServiceMax, to extend Predix and analytics across field service processes. This acquisition closed in January 2017.
- 2016: GE Digital acquires Roanoke VA based software company Meridium that specializes in helping industrial customers predict when machinery might fail and also offers analysis that can enhance the efficiency of operation

=== 2018: Plans for standalone business ===
- 2018: GE announced its intended sale of a majority stake of ServiceMax
- 2018: GE announces plans to establish a new, $1.2 billion independent company focused on building a comprehensive Industrial Internet of Things (IIoT) software portfolio comprising GE Digital, GE Power Digital and GE Grid Solutions.

=== 2019–2020: Refining Focus ===
- 2019: GE announces that the APM teams and customer accounts previously part of BHGE will also become part of the ‘NewCo’ announced in 2018.

On July 1, 2019, Patrick Byrne joined GE as chief executive officer of GE's Digital business reporting to GE CEO and chairman H. Lawrence Culp Jr. Following the GE October 2019 earnings call, Culp announced GE would retain its digital business. On June 3, 2020, Byrne's role was expanded to include VP lean transformation for GE.

=== 2021–2024: Plan to splitting GE ===
- 2021: GE announces plan to splitting business into three new public companies: GE Vernova, GE HealthCare and GE Aerospace. GE Digital along with GE Renewable Energy, GE Power and GE Energy Financial Services will come together as GE Vernova.
- 2024: GE announces planned spin-off date for beginning of second quarter of 2024. On April 2, 2024, General Electric completed its spinoff of GE Vernova.

== Projects ==
=== Digital Twin Blueprints ===
In March 2020, GE Digital announced the GE Digital Core Digital Twin Blueprint library had exceeded 300 types of industrial assets, used to manage 8000 customer assets remotely via its Industrial Managed Services center.

=== New York Power Authority (NYPA) ===
In October 2017, GE announced a software and professional services agreement with the New York State Power Authority (NYPA). NYPA intended to work with GE to explore the digitalization, from its 16 generating facilities and 1,400 miles of electricity transmission network, to the more than 1,000 public buildings it monitors throughout the state.

=== Chery Jaguar Land Rover ===
2012, Chery Jaguar Land Rover Automotive Co., Ltd. (CJLR) is a 50:50 independent joint venture formed between Chinese auto manufacturer Chery Automobile Co., Ltd. and UK auto manufacturer Jaguar Land Rover. With a factory in Changshu, China, CJLR produces 130,000 high-end luxury vehicles per year. The company uses GE Digital's Proficy MES in their engine manufacturing facility in Changshu, connecting more than 100,000 integration points on a real time basis across 500 machines on the shop floor.

=== Power System Operation Corporation (POSOCO) ===
On April 5, 2020, the prime minister of India asked citizens to turn off their lights for nine minutes in a show of solidarity in the fight against COVID-19. With meticulous planning by India's Power System Operation Corporation (POSOCO), national and state agencies, and supported by the GE Digital Grid Software team and advanced energy management system (AEMS), the nation's power grid withstood a 31-gigawatt drop and recovery.

=== Shanghai Automobile Gear Works ===
China's Shanghai Automobile Gear Works (SAQW) is a subsidiary of China-owned SAIC Motor Corporation. The company manufactures, markets, and exports automotive transmissions and key components for passenger and commercial vehicles. With 7000 employees across 5 heating treatment lines, SAGW produces more than 3.8 million units annually. SAGW has transformed their manufacturing processes by using GE Digital's Proficy Plant Applications to create a "Process Digital Twin", improving equipment utilization by 20% and reducing inspection costs by 40%. The availability of real-time data has led to a 30% reduction in inventory and an 80% reduction in required storage space.

=== Wacker ===
Wacker Chemical Corporation is a global manufacturer of highly developed specialty chemicals. In Charleston, Tennessee, Wacker produces up to 20,000 tons of polycristaline silicon each year, a critical component for the solar photovoltaic and wider electronics sector. By law, critical assets, such as the pressure vessels Wacker uses in their manufacturing process, must be maintained every two years. Wacker use of APM from GE Digital extends pressure vessel scheduled maintenance from every two years to a maximum of every 10 years, saving millions of dollars annually.
