= GE Wind =

American wind turbine manufacturer

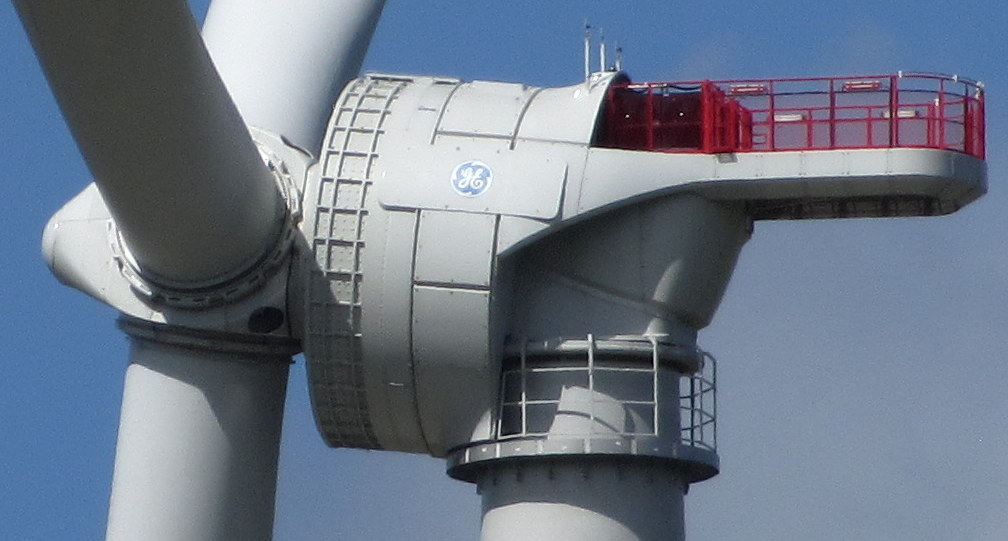
- A wind turbine GE-Alstom Haliade 150-6MW in 2017
- Type: Division
- Industry: Wind power
- Predecessor: Zond and Alstom Wind
- Founded: 1980; 46 years ago
- Founder: James Dehlsen
- Headquarters: Schenectady, New York
- Area served: Worldwide
- Key people: Vic Abate (CEO of GE Vernova's Wind businesses)
- Products: Wind turbines, sale and services of wind farms
- Revenue: US$10.4 billion (2020 Onshore Wind)
- Parent: GE Vernova
- Subsidiaries: GE Offshore Wind, LM Wind Power
- Website: https://www.gevernova.com/wind-power/onshore-wind

GE Wind is a division of GE Vernova. The company manufactures and sells wind turbines to the international market. In 2018, GE Wind was the fourth largest wind turbine manufacturer in the world. Vic Abate is the CEO of GE Vernova’s Wind businesses.

== History ==
=== Enron Wind acquisition era (2002–2015) ===
The entity was created as developer (not manufacturer) Zond in 1980 by James G.P. Dehlsen, who also formed Clipper Windpower in 2001. Enron acquired Zond and the German manufacturer Tacke Windtechnik in 1997.

In 2002, while gas turbine sales were declining, GE acquired the Enron Wind, the only surviving US manufacturer of large wind turbines at the time, during the bankruptcy proceedings of its parent, Enron. GE increased engineering and support for the Wind Division and doubled its annual sales to $1.2B in 2003.

By acquiring Zond, GE gained a very important patent for variable-speed systems (US 5083039), which had a major impact on the North American market. Enron had continued production of the 1 MW and 1.5 MW wind turbines of Tacke Windtechnik and GE has expanded production in Germany.

GE acquired ScanWind in 2009, and in 2011 Wind Tower Systems LLC, a manufacturer of space frame wind turbine towers.

=== Growth and acquisition of Alstom Wind (2015–) ===
After the acquisition of Alstom's energy generating assets (2015) GE's wind portfolio was expanded to include the 6-megawatt 'Haliade' offshore turbine (at that time one of the world's most powerful turbines) from Alstom Wind. This became GE Offshore Wind. The same year, GE added Blade Dynamics Ltd., a designer and manufacturer of modular wind turbine blades with principal facilities on the Isle of Wight and in Southampton.

GE acquired LM Wind Power from Doughty Hanson & Co for an enterprise value of €1.5 billion in April 2017.

== Products ==
=== Alstom / Ecotecnia turbines ===
GE acquired the Alstom and Ecotecia turbines in 2015.

Product name	Power rating (MW)	Rotor diameter (m)	Hub height (m)	IEC Wind Class
ECO 80	1.67–2	80	70–80	
ECO 86	1.67	86	80	
ECO 100	3.0	100	75, 90, 100	
ECO 110	3.0	110	75, 90, 100	
ECO 122	2.7–3.0	122	89, 119, 139	

=== GE Wind Turbines ===
Product name	Power rating (MW)	Rotor diameter (m)	Hub height (m)	IEC Wind Class
GE 1.5se	1.5	70.5	54.7	
GE 1.5sle	1.5	77	61.4	
GE 1.5xle	1.5	82.5	59	
GE 1.x-82.5	1.6	82.5	121.25	IIs
GE 1.x-87	1.85	87	80	IIs
GE 2.5xl	2.5	100	85	IIb
GE 1.x-100/103	1.6–1.7	100/103	80, 96	IIIs
GE 3.x-103	2.5–3.2	103	98, 75, 85	IIb
GE 3.x-137	3.2–3.8	137	110–164	III
GE 3.x-130	3.2–3.8	130	85–164	II
GE 2.x-116	2.0–2.5	116	80, 90, 94	IIs/IIIs
GE 2.x-120	2.5–2.75	120	85, 110, 120, 139	IIIs, DiBT WZII
GE 2.x-127	2.2–2.5	127	89	IIs/IIIs
GE 4.2-117 (Typhoon class)	4.2	117		
GE 4.8-158	4.8	158	101, 120.9, 149, 161	
GE 3.6sl (offshore)	3.6	111		
GE 4.1-113 (offshore)	4.1	113		Ib
GE Haliade 150-6 (offshore)	6	150	110 or site-specific	Ib
GE Haliade-X (offshore)	12	220	up to 150	Ib
GE Haliade-X 13MW (offshore)	13	220	138	
GE Haliade-X 14MW (offshore)	14	220		

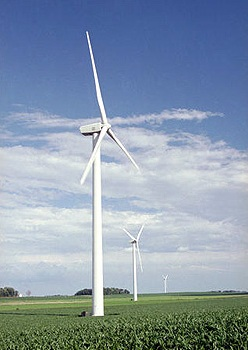
GE 1.5-megawatt wind turbine

=== GE onshore wind turbines ===
The GE platform began development with the creation of the 1.5-megawatt series of wind turbines that were developed with the cooperation of the United States Department of Energy. It consisted of three fibreglass blades attached to a horizontal axis hub. The hub is connected to the main shaft that turns a multi-stage system of gears. The gears increase the rotational rate and send the kinetic energy obtained from the wind to a doubly-fed electric machine, where it is converted into electrical energy. The angle of the blades and the direction that the turbine faces are controlled by an active, all- electric pitch and yaw system. The generator and gearbox are contained in the nacelle, which is further insulated to minimize noise emissions.

Several optional features support its presence in electrical grids, including voltage regulation, low-voltage ride-through, and the delivery of reactive power during grid disturbances or periods of low wind.

To further wind power research, a unit was commissioned at the National Wind Technology Center in late 2009. Its 10,000 installations in the US at the time constituted 50% of the national commercial wind energy fleet, influencing the NREL's decision to install a model at the Center.

The next evolution, the 2.5XL, used a permanent magnet generator, and its entire output was converted to AC at mains frequency. The platform was then moved back to the use of a doubly-fed generator and rotor converter, similar to the 1.5 series.

As of 2022, GE had over 40,000 turbines installed across the globe.

=== GE offshore wind turbines ===
The offshore GE 3.6 SL model was installed in 2003 at the Arklow Bank Wind Park in Ireland.

In the early 2010s GE cancelled its development of a 4.1-megawatt offshore wind turbine. The only example built, owned by Goteborg Energi, was erected in Goteborg, Sweden, in 2011.

Following the purchase of the Ecotècnia by Alstom and the acquisition of Alstom by General Electric, production started in 2016 at the St. Nazaire factory in France for the 6-megawatt Haliade offshore turbine, featuring a permanent magnet design. This unit started an extended test period in Spring 2016 at Østerild Wind Turbine Test Field.

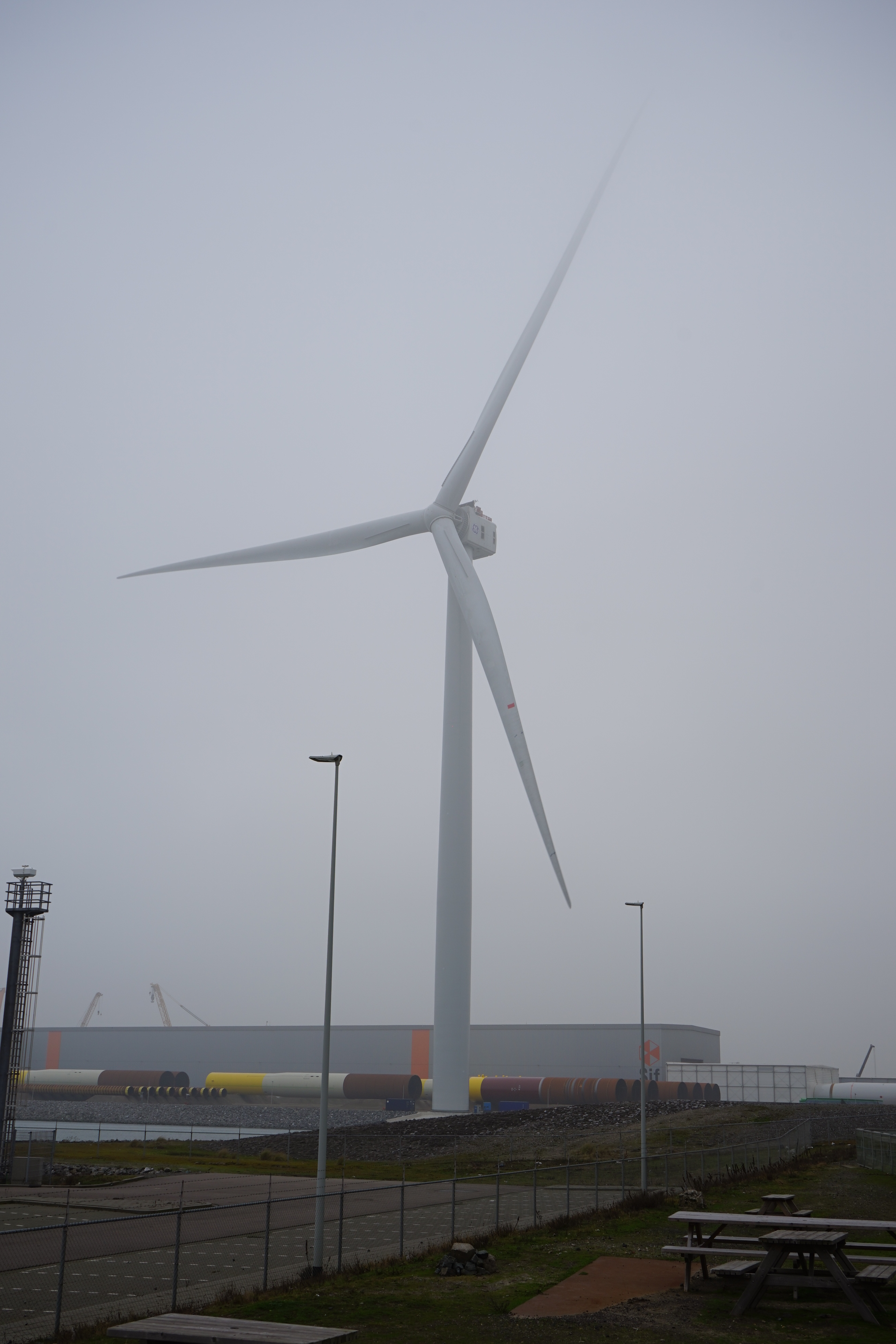
Haliade-X prototype, 12 MW (Rotterdam, 2020)

The Haliade-X was certified for typhoons in 2021. using a prototype in Rotterdam. GE and Hyundai agreed to build a Haliade-X factory in South Korea.

== Key projects ==
The 845-megawatt Shepherds Flat Wind Farm in Oregon is the first windpark in the United States to utilize permanent magnet design in its primary wind turbine.

Fântânele-Cogealac Wind Farm in Romania, constructed in 2008, uses 240 GE 2.5xl wind turbines capable of generating a total of 600 MW, powering a million Romanian households each year.

The offshore GE 3.6 SL model was installed at the Arklow Bank Wind Park.

Through the provision of 179 GE 3.6-137 turbines to Markbygden Wind Farm in Sweden, GE will create the largest single onshore wind installation in Europe. Norsk Hydro will purchase the power via a 19-year fixed volume corporate PPA; understood to be the largest corporate wind energy PPA in the world.

In April 2018, General Electric announced that it will begin testing the world's largest wind turbine – the Haliade-X – at its facilities in Blyth, England. General Electric's renewable energy department signed a five-year contract with the British government-funded Offshore Renewable Energy (ORE) Catapult to begin trials of the 12-megawatt turbine. A prototype was installed at Port of Rotterdam, producing 288 MWh in 24 hours in February 2020, and a 14 MW prototype started there in October 2021.

Plans in September 2020 called for a new upgraded version of 13 MW GE Haliade-X turbine to be installed at Dogger Bank Wind Farm by 2023, and DNV-certified in late 2022.

== See also ==
- Wind farm
- List of wind turbine manufacturers
