= Arabelle Solutions =

French-based GE's company in Belfort

Arabelle Solutions SAS

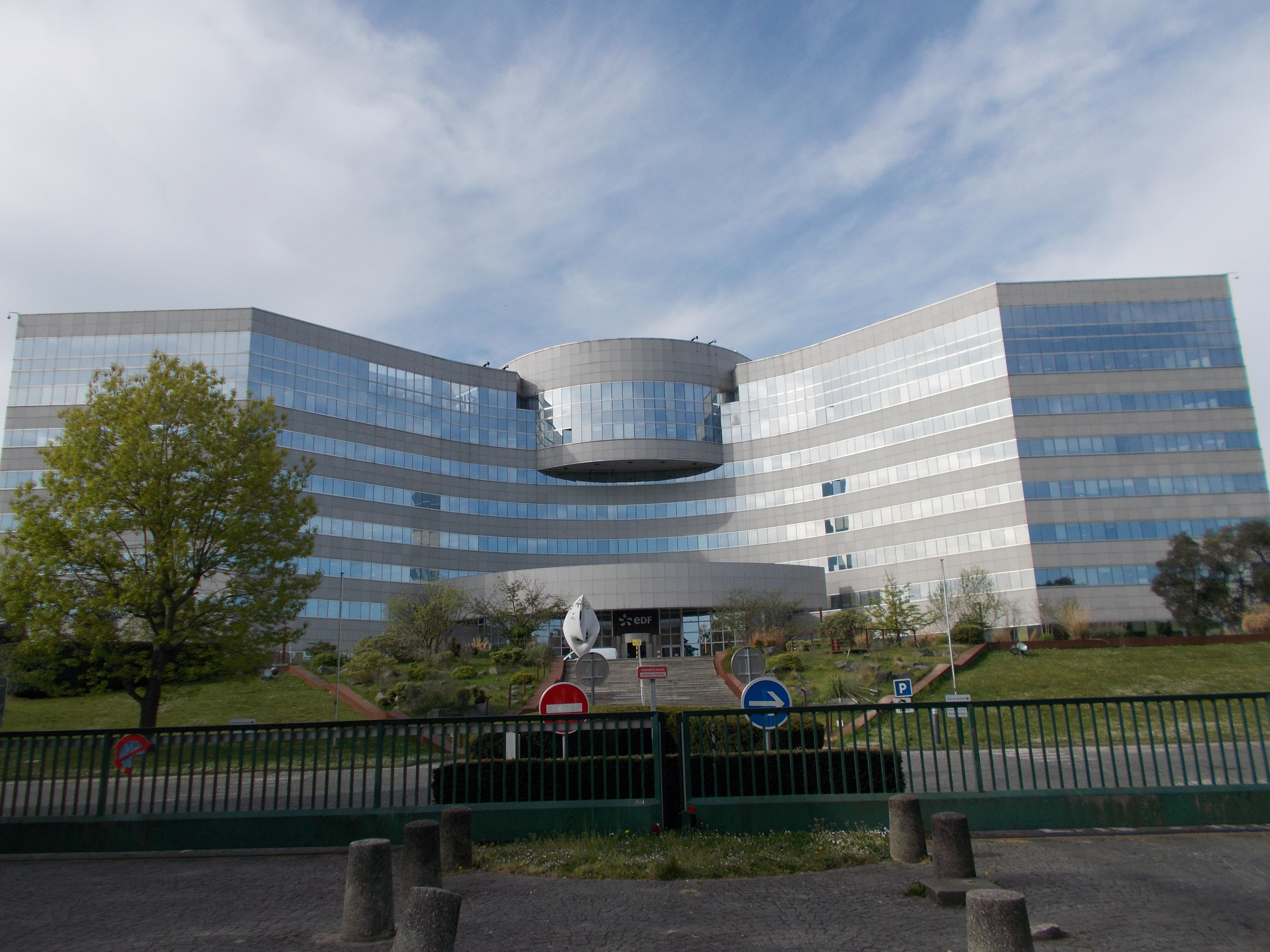
- Arabelle Solutions' headquarters in Nanterre, near Paris, France.
- Formerly: Alstom Power Systems, GE Alstom Nuclear Systems, GE Steam Power
- Company type: Société par actions simplifiée
- Industry: Nuclear
- Predecessor: GE Power (non-US nuclear activities)
- Founded: 1950 : Société pour l'exploitation des appareils Rateau
- Founder: Auguste Rateau
- Headquarters: 32 Avenue Pablo Picasso, 92000 Nanterre, France
- Area served: Worldwide
- Key people: Catherine Cornand (CEO)
- Products: Arabelle turbine
- Owner: EDF
- Number of employees: 3,300 (2024)
- Parent: EDF
- Subsidiaries: GE Steam Power Systems, GE Steam Power Service
- Website: www.arabellesolutions.com

Arabelle Solutions, formerly GE Alstom Nuclear Systems, or GEAST, for ‘GE Alstom’, most of which was spun off from GE Steam Power, is a French multinational specialising in nuclear activities related to steam turbines (Arabelle) for the turbine islands. It is present in nearly 16 countries including China, Finland, India, Romania and the United Kingdom, and headquartered in Nanterre, France. At Belfort, it is developing the Arabelle nuclear turbine, the most powerful in the world.

Historically based in France, notably at its Belfort site, it has been a subsidiary of EDF since 31 May 2024. Originally a joint subsidiary named GE Alstom Nuclear Systems (GEAST) between General Electric and Alstom, it became an 80%-owned subsidiary of General Electric, then of GE Vernova, in October 2018. The French state held a 20% stake in GEAST. Headed by Frédéric Wiscart, GE Alstom Nuclear Systems also brought together GE Steam Power's nuclear activities, resulting from the acquisition of Alstom Power in 2015, through its two subsidiaries GE Steam Power Systems (formerly Alstom Power Systems) and GE Steam Power Service (formerly Alstom Power Services).

The controversial sale to General Electric was accompanied by safeguards given the strategic nature of the turbines for France, which retained intellectual property rights and a golden share in GE Alstom Nuclear Systems (GEAST).

When it was acquired by EDF, it was supplemented by GE Steam Power's global activities outside the Americas, also resulting from the acquisition of Alstom Power by the former US conglomerate General Electric in 2015.

== History ==
=== Origins ===
In the 1950s, Rateau and General Electric developed the first nuclear steam turbines at Marcoule in France and Dresden in the United States. In the 1970s, Alstom acquired Rateau, which became Alstom Rateau. The name ‘Arabelle’ comes from the contraction of ‘Alstom Rateau Belfort Le Bourget’.

=== 2014: General Electric acquires Alstom Power ===
In 2014, the partial takeover of Alstom by General Electric (GE) was proposed for $13 billion. Emmanuel Macron, then an adviser and then a minister under François Hollande, agreed to the sale by Alstom of part of its energy business to its American competitor.

A joint GE-Alstom subsidiary was then created: GE Alstom Nuclear Systems (GEAST). This combined the activities of two of Alstom's subsidiaries: Alstom Power Systems and Alstom Power Service. GE Alstom Nuclear Systems was 80% owned by General Electric and 20% by Alstom. It has ‘specific governance rules’ designed to protect national interests, including maintaining in France a strategic activity developed by Alstom, such as the Arabelle turbine, the most powerful in the world.

In January 2016, GE announced that it was cutting 6,500 jobs in Europe, including 765 in France, in Alstom's energy business. It was specified that the Belfort site would not be affected.

In June 2016, General Electric, which is now responsible for maintaining Alstom Power's Arabelle turbines that power France's nuclear power plants, wanted to reduce its financial liability in the event of an incident, even if it meant entering into a showdown with EDF.

=== 2018: Alstom withdraws completely from GE Alstom Nuclear Systems (GEAST) ===
According to a report dated 17 January 2018 by the French National Assembly's committee of enquiry tasked with examining the French government's industrial policy decisions in the light of the company mergers that have taken place, particularly in the cases of Alstom, Alcatel and STX, and the means likely to protect national industrial flagships in a globalised commercial context, one of the members of GEAST's board of directors is appointed by the French government, The government has a specific right of veto (or golden share) for any decision ‘that would affect the integrity and continuity of GEAST's industrial offering around the conventional island, or call into question the rights held by the government at the time of the acquisition with regard to intellectual property or the research and development programme for which it has exclusive rights’.

On 2 October 2018, Alstom sold its 20% stake in its three energy joint ventures with GE, namely the Renewables, Grid and GE Alstom Nuclear Systems (GEAST) joint ventures.

In 2020, in search of cash, General Electric is committed to selling a large part of its assets, including potentially GE Steam Power and GE Alstom Nuclear Systems, the former Alstom nuclear activities.

=== 2022–2024: sale to EDF ===
In January 2022, France's EDF and General Electric agreed to acquire part of GE Steam Power (formerly Alstom Power Systems), GE Power's nuclear activities. EDF will pay around €175 million for this transaction, after taking into account the cash and debt of the business acquired. This former Alstom Power business, valued at one billion euros, is mainly grouped in GE Alstom Nuclear Systems (GEAST).

On 10 February 2022, France's EDF and General Electric announced that they had signed an exclusivity agreement regarding EDF's proposed acquisition of GE Steam Power's global nuclear business, primarily the GE Alstom Nuclear Systems (GEAST) and Arabelle turbine businesses. The sale excludes GE Steam Power's US operations. EDF will pay approximately €175 million for the transaction, after taking into account the cash and debt of the acquired business.

In March 2022, the French government is said to be prepared to sell 20% of GE Alstom Nuclear Systems (GEAST) to Rosatom, following its purchase from General Electric by EDF, which would retain the remaining 80%. Rosatom, the Russian multinational specialising in nuclear power, is responsible for half of the order book at the Belfort plant where Arabelle turbines are manufactured.

At the beginning of November 2022, the agreement was signed between the two parties. The effective takeover by EDF of the activities concerned (key equipment for new nuclear power plants, including Arabelle turbines, and maintenance and upgrades for existing nuclear power plants outside the Americas) is scheduled for the second quarter of 2023.

Following Russia's invasion of Ukraine, EDF's purchase of General Electric's ‘Arabelle’ turbines, scheduled for summer 2023, has been postponed because of US sanctions against Russia, which could jeopardise the successful completion of GEAST's contracts, in particular deliveries of its steam turbines to the reactors being built by Rosatom in Egypt, Hungary and Turkey.

On 31 May 2024, EDF officially takes over the nuclear activities of GE Vernova, the successor to General Electric, including the maintenance and manufacture of Arabelle turbines. Frédéric Wiscart, current CEO of GE Alstom Nuclear Systems (GEAST), becomes Chairman of Arabelle Solutions, the new name of GE Alstom Nuclear Systems within EDF. Bernard Fontana, Chairman of Framatome, also an EDF subsidiary, is appointed Chairman of Arabelle Solutions.

On July 1, 2025, Catherine Cornand succeeds Bernard Fontana as President (CEO) of Arabelle Solutions, following the latter’s appointment as Chairman of EDF.

== See also ==
=== Related articles ===
- GE Steam Power
- General Electric
- Alstom
- Alstom Power
- Belfort
