= GE Vernova =

American energy technology company

GE Vernova Inc.

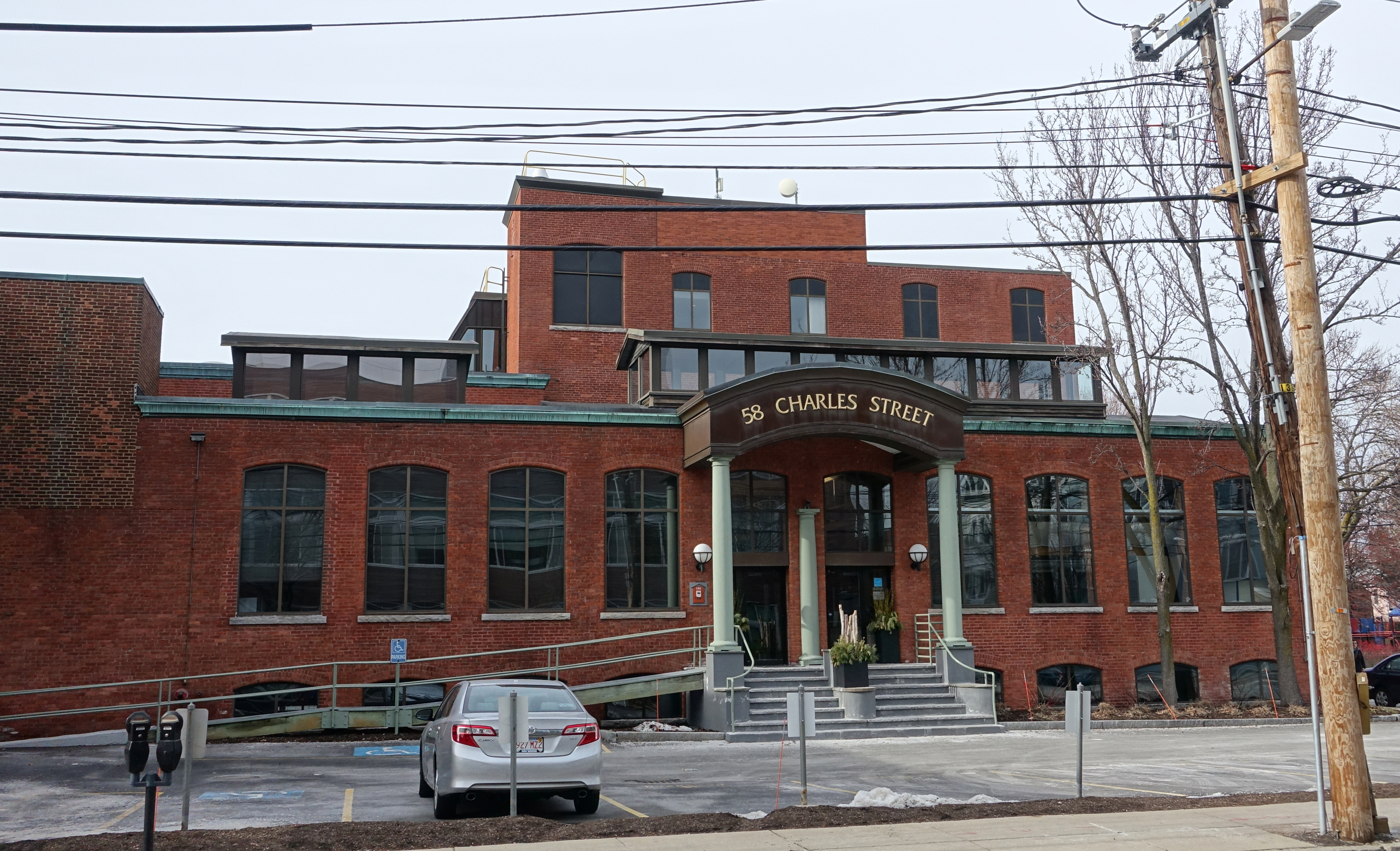
- Headquarters in Cambridge, Massachusetts
- Formerly: General Electric Company
- Type: Public
- Traded as: NYSE: GEV; S&P 100 component; S&P 500 component
- Industry: Energy
- Predecessors: General Electric
- Founded: April 15, 1892; 134 years ago in Schenectady, New York, U.S. (as General Electric); April 2, 2024; 2 years ago (as GE Vernova)
- Founder: Thomas Edison (as General Electric)
- Headquarters: Cambridge, Massachusetts, U.S.
- Key people: Scott Strazik (CEO); Steve Angel (chairman)
- Revenue: ▲US$38.07 billion (2025)
- Operating income: ▲US$1.388 billion (2025)
- Net income: ▲US$4.884 billion (2025)
- Total assets: ▲US$63.02 billion (2025)
- Total equity: ▲US$11.18 billion (2025)
- Number of employees: 70,000 (2025)
- Subsidiaries: GE Vernova Hitachi Nuclear Energy; GE Wind; GE Offshore Wind; LM Wind Power; GE Power Conversion; GE Energy Financial Services
- Website: gevernova.com

GE Vernova, Inc. is an energy equipment manufacturing and services company headquartered in Cambridge, Massachusetts. The company operates through three main segments: Power, which designs, manufactures, and services gas, nuclear, hydro, and steam technologies; Wind, which provides onshore and offshore wind turbines and blades; and Electrification, which offers grid solutions, power conversion, solar and storage solutions, and digital technologies for the transmission, distribution, and management of electricity.

GE Vernova was formed as part of the 2024 breakup of General Electric (GE), which was founded in 1892 through the merger of Thomas Edison's Edison General Electric Company and Thomson-Houston Electric Company. In November 2021, GE announced plans to split into three independent public companies. GE HealthCare was spun off in January 2023, followed by the spin-off of GE's energy businesses in April 2024 to create GE Vernova from the merger of GE Power, GE Renewable Energy, GE Digital, and GE Energy Financial Services. The remaining aviation business became GE Aerospace.

GE Vernova engages in various contracts and partnerships with the U.S. government, including securing a deal to supply propulsion load systems for U.S. Navy testing facilities, collaborating on cybersecurity assessments with the Department of Energy's CESER program, participating in coalitions for small modular reactors with utilities like TVA to apply for DOE grants, and working with the government to boost stockpiles of rare earth yttrium amid supply concerns.

GE Vernova operates an Advanced Research Center in Niskayuna, New York, co-located on the historic GE Research campus that traces its origins to the company's 1900 establishment of one of the first industrial research labs in the U.S., founded by Thomas Edison, Willis R. Whitney, and Charles Steinmetz; this independent facility, separate from GE Aerospace's research center on the same campus, serves as a key hub for energy innovation. In 2025, GE Vernova announced an investment of over $105 million, supported by the State of New York, to expand the 50,000-square-foot center, creating 75 new research positions focused on technologies such as carbon capture, alternative fuels for power generation, AI and robotics for manufacturing, and advanced grid solutions. The center is characterized by a high concentration of advanced degree holders, with a significant majority of its research staff possessing PhDs in specialized engineering and physical science disciplines. Its workforce includes a global cohort of scientists and engineers recruited from top-tier technical universities and industrial research programs.

== History ==
=== Founding of GE Power ===
GE Power was founded as GE Energy in 2008, and was a division of General Electric. GE Energy was headquartered in Atlanta, Georgia. GE Energy was founded as part of a company-wide reorganization prompted by financial losses leading to the formation from GE Infrastructure division. In 2012 GE Power was created following the spin-off of GE Energy.

=== Acquisition of Alstom's energy business ===
Between April and June 2014, General Electric entered into negotiations to acquire the energy business of the French group Alstom. On April 24, 2014, the first information was published about General Electric's partial takeover of Alstom for $13 billion. On April 30, Alstom's board of directors accepted General Electric's €12.35 billion offer for its energy business. General Electric confirmed its offer of $16.9 billion.

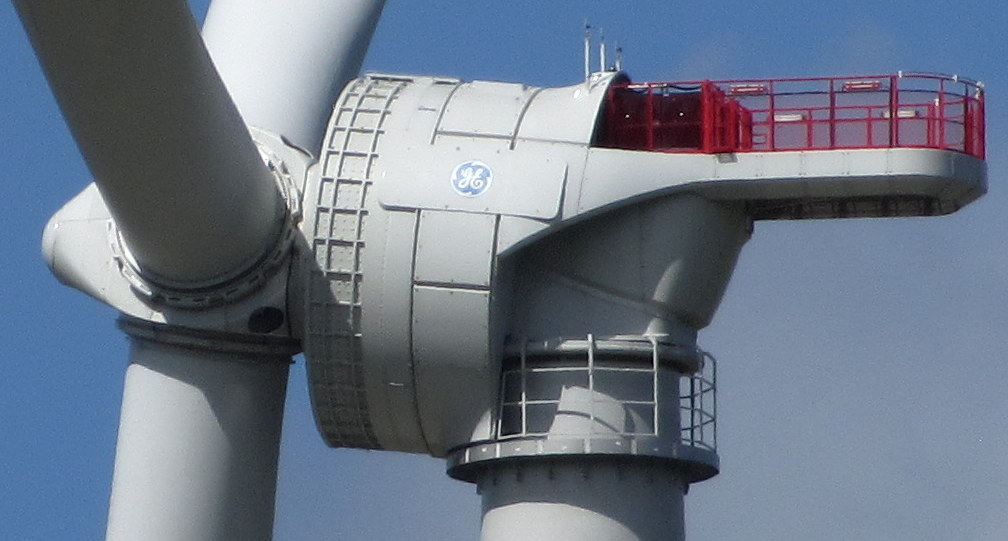
An offshore GE-Alstom Haliade 150-6MW turbine in 2017.

In 2015, the Franco-American subsidiary GE Renewable Energy was created from the acquisition of the energy activities (Alstom Power and Alstom Grid) of Alstom, which specializes in renewable energies. It was headquartered in Boulogne-Billancourt, France and focused on the production of energy systems that use renewable sources. Its products included wind (onshore and offshore), hydroelectric and solar (concentrated and photovoltaic) power generating facilities.

In January 2016, General Electric announced that it was cutting 6,500 jobs in its energy division, GE Power. In October 2016, General Electric announced the acquisition of LM Wind Power, a Danish company that is one of its main suppliers of wind turbine blades, for $1.65 billion.

In May 2018, Alstom announced the sale of its interests in its three joint ventures with General Electric to GE for €2.594 billion. These joint ventures were active in the power grid, nuclear and renewable energy sectors.

In July 2018, one month after buying all the shares in its joint venture with Alstom, General Electric announced a restructuring plan for the Hydro division, cutting 1,330 jobs worldwide, including 293 jobs in Grenoble, France even though GE had committed to creating 1,000 jobs in France when it bought Alstom's energy division.

On April 18, 2021, GE Steam Power's management announced that it was reducing its job cuts plan, deciding to save 94 jobs and thus cut 144. On April 30, 2021, the unions in France announced that they would continue to blockade the steam power site in Belfort "for as long as necessary", also blocking the special convoy transporting a turbine to the Hinkley Point nuclear power plant in the UK.

=== Spin-off ===
On November 9, 2021, General Electric announced that it would split into three publicly traded companies. The following year, they announced the names would be GE HealthCare, GE Aerospace, and GE Vernova. GE Healthcare was the first to be spun off, on January 4, 2023. GE Vernova was the second to be spun off. In preparation for the spin-off, GE Vernova, LLC was founded on February 28, 2023. The LLC was incorporated on April 2, 2024, as GE Vernova Inc. and was listed on the New York Stock Exchange under ticker symbol GEV. After the completion of the two spin-offs, the remaining part of General Electric rebranded itself GE Aerospace.

=== Sale of nuclear turbine business ===
In January 2022, France's EDF and General Electric agreed on a takeover of a major part of GE Steam Power (formerly Alstom Power), GE Power's nuclear activities. EDF will pay around €175 million for this transaction, once the cash and debt of the acquired business have been taken into account. This former Alstom Power business, valued at one billion euros, specialises in nuclear turbine-generator sets, in particular "Arabelle", and the maintenance services associated with the reactors deployed. It sold this subsidiary to EDF in May 2024.

=== Purchase of Trench Group ===
In October 2026, GE Vernova agreed to acquire Trench Group for $9 billion to bolster its portfolio of high-voltage power grid equipment. The deal was structured 50/50 cash and debt and was expected to close in late 2027.

== Structure ==
GE Vernova is organized into four divisions based in the United States, France and Denmark:

- Power, led by Eric Gray (Cambridge, Massachusetts);
  - Gas Power, formerly GE Power (Atlanta, Georgia);
  - Steam Power, formerly GE Steam Power, sold almost entirely to EDF in May 2024
  - GE Vernova Hitachi Nuclear Energy (Wilmington, North Carolina);
  - Hydro Power, formerly Alstom Power Hydro (Grenoble, France);
- Wind, led by Vic Abate (Schenectady, New York);
  - Onshore Wind, formerly GE Wind (Schenectady, New York);
  - Offshore Wind, formerly GE Offshore Wind, formerly Alstom Wind (Nantes, France);
  - LM Wind Power (Kolding, Denmark);
- Electrification Systems, led by Philippe Piron (Boulogne-Billancourt, France);
  - Power Conversion and Storage, formerly GE Power Conversion (Paris-Saclay, France);
  - Grid Solutions, formerly Alstom Grid (Boulogne-Billancourt, France);
- Electrification Software, formerly GE Digital, led by Scott Reese (Charlotte, North Carolina).
  - Digital Grid Software & Services, led by Mahesh Sudhakaran;
  - Digital Engineering, led by Prakash Seshadri;
  - Digital Power & Energy Resources, led by Linda Rae;
  - Proficy Software & Services, formerly Digital Manufacturing, led by Richard Kenedi. As of December 2025, acquisition in progress by US-based investment firm TPG Capital.
