= GE Energy Financial Services =

Division of GE Vernova

- Company type: Division
- Industry: Finance
- Predecessor: GE Capital
- Key people: Nomi Ahmad (CEO)
- Parent: GE Vernova
- Website: gevernova.com/financial-services

GE Energy Financial Services (EFS), a division of GE Vernova headquartered in Stamford, Connecticut, United States, provides financial and technological investment in energy infrastructure projects around the world. EFS is active within industries such as power generation and distribution, oil and gas, pipelines and storage, water, venture capital, and renewable energy. EFS portfolios include deepwater oil and gas exploration in Brazil and water pipeline projects in Jordan.

GE EFS has invested billions of dollars in the solar industry. One of their most recent investment is a 127-megawatt solar farm in Arlington, Arizona, which is about 40 mi (64 km) west of Phoenix.

In 2021 a plan to split GE into three new public companies (GE Vernova, GE HealthCare, and GE Aerospace) was announced. GE Energy Financial Services, along with GE Digital, GE Renewable Energy, and GE Power were combined as GE Vernova. The spin-off was completed in the second quarter of 2024.

== Partial list of projects ==
- Dokie Ridge Wind Farm, near Chetwynd, British Columbia, Canada
- Toba Inlet run-of-the river project in Toba Inlet, British Columbia, Canada (joint venture through Toba Montrose General Partnership)
