= EDF Renewables =

Renewable energy company

EDF Power Solutions
- Type: Société Anonyme
- Industry: Energy
- Founded: 2004
- Founder: Pâris Mouratoglou
- Headquarters: Nanterre, France
- Key people: Béatrice Buffon (CEO)
- Products: Electricity generation and development.
- Revenue: ▲€1,856 million (2021)
- Operating income: ▼€813 million (2021)
- Number of employees: 4,382 (2021)
- Parent: Électricité de France
- Website: www.edf-re.com

EDF Power Solutions (formerly EDF Renouvelables & EDF Renewables) is a wholly owned subsidiary of the French utility EDF Group, specializing in renewable energy production. As an integrated operator, the Group develops and finances the construction of renewable energy facilities, and manages operations and maintenance for its own account and for third parties.

According to its own figures, the company is active in 22 countries with an installed global capacity of 12,468 MW (as of June 2019), with wind being the largest sector, followed by solar and energy storage. The company is also involved in marine energy.

The company was formerly known as EDF Energies Nouvelles until it was rebranded in April 2018 to EDF Renewables. In May 2025 EDF Renewables North America and EDF International Division Americas merged and rebranded again as EDF power solutions North America.

== History ==
In 1990, the Société Internationale d'Investissements Financiers – Énergies (SIIF Énergies) was created by Pâris Mouratoglou, a thermal and hydroelectric power plant development company. The firm in 1999 positioned itself in the renewable energy sector and in 2000, Pâris Mouratoglou sold 35% of SIIF Énergies to Électricité de France (EDF).

In 2002, EDF increased its stake in SIIF Énergies to 50%. Two years later, SIIF became EDF Energies Nouvelles (EDF EN), while maintaining the same capital structure. EDF listed EDF Energies Nouvelles on the stock exchange in 2006. Pâris Mouratoglou retained a 25.1% stake of the capital at that time, while EDF held 50%, the balance being the free float on the stock market.

EDF Energies Nouvelles unlisted from the stock market on 15 August 2011, following EDF's buy-out of the remaining 50% stake from Pâris Mouratoglou and the free float, pushing EDF's stake in EDF Energies Nouvelles to 100%.

=== International expansion ===
In 2012, the group increased its involvement in offshore wind energy and entered the markets of Poland, Israel, Morocco and South Africa. A year later, EDF Energies Nouvelles expanded into the Indian market. EDF Energies Nouvelles that year acquired the wind power business of Séchilienne-Sidec (now Albioma) for €59 million. The company entered Brazil and Chile in 2015.

Upon expanding into China in 2016, the company acquired an 80% stake in Hong Kong-based UPC Asia Wind Management, a company specialising in onshore wind power in China. This move was based on a strategy that saw increasing its wind capacity in China by working with Chinese partners on a project-by-project basis.

In April 2017, EDF EN announced the acquisition of a 67.2% majority stake, in addition to convertible bonds, in Futuren, a wind farm operator, valued at around €188 million. In December of that year, EDF launched the Solar Plan, with which the EDF Group hoped to build 30 GW of solar photovoltaic power in France between 2020 and 2035, for an investment of around €25 billion.

In 2018, EDF Energies Nouvelles rebranded to become EDF Renewables to boost international appeal.

In April of that year, the group acquired Luxel, a company specialising in photovoltaic installations, with the acquisition concluding on 1 April 2019.

In 2023, EDF Renewables was operating 12.8 GW of wind and solar capacity.

== Core business activities ==
=== Onshore and offshore wind power ===
Wind power is EDF Renewables' main sector with 87% of its total installed capacity distributed mainly in Europe and North America. Wind power is EDF's main growth driver. As of June 2019, the group had a total of 12,468 MW gross in operation and 4,055 MW under construction in 22 countries.

EDF signed a supply contract with the Procter & Gamble Group in 2015 to supply wind power to its North American manufacturing sites. The 123 MW wind farm is expected to help P&G achieve their goal to reduce CO_{2}-emissions by 30% by 2020.

The group is a key player in offshore wind energy, with two offshore wind farms in Belgium (C-Power) and the United Kingdom (Teesside). In March 2019, EDF Renewables acquired stakes in two Chinese offshore projects, the Dongtai IV and V wind farms, that will be delivered in cooperation with Chinese power utility China Energy Investment Corporation (CEI) by 2021.

It is involved in three structuring projects under development in France, won through a government call for tenders, totalling nearly 1,500 MW in Saint-Nazaire, Calvados/Courseulles-sur-Mer and Fécamp.

=== Photovoltaic sector ===
The photovoltaic solar sector is EDF Renewables' second largest business sector. It currently has solar energy projects in 13 countries with an installed capacity of 2,423 MW, according to own figures. In 2016, EDF Renewables opened the Bolero solar power plant in Chile’s Atacama Desert in with a capacity of 146 MW.

One of the company's subsidiaries, French solar panel manufacturer Photowatt, announced to be forming a joint venture with Canadian Solar and EMC Greentech to develop solar panels based on a new technology.

In 2019, EDF Renewables, along with Total Eren and their joint venture EDEN Renewables India, signed a 25-year power purchase agreement (PPA) to develop four solar power projects in India, with a capacity of 716 MW.

In September 2023, it was announced EDF Renewables North America had sold its 200MW Millers Branch Solar Facility in Haskell County, Texas to the Southern Company subsidiary, Southern Power for an undisclosed amount.

=== Electricity storage ===
In March 2018, EDF announced a major electrical storage plan with the objective of becoming the European leader in the sector by 2035, for an investment worth €8 billion over the period 2018–2035.

In June 2018, EDF opened a 49MW battery storage facility in West Burton, UK.

The firm acquired British battery storage start-up Pivot Power in November 2019 for an undisclosed amount.

== International operations ==
=== Europe ===
==== Germany ====
On 5 July 2017, EDF EN announced the acquisition of Offshore Wind Solutions (OWS), a German company specializing in the operation and maintenance of offshore wind farms, in order to complete its operations conducted through Reetec Gmbh, in which EDF EN acquired a stake in 2007.

EDF began the refurbishment of the Eckolstädt wind farm in Thuringia in December 2018, updating its capacity from 14.5 MW to 34.5 MW when the works are finished.

EDF Renewables acquired wind projects of 300MW under development in Germany from Altus in September 2019.

==== France ====
In June 2017, EDF opened the Montagne-Ardéchois wind farm, the most powerful in the Auvergne-Rhône-Alpes region. The facility consists of 29 turbines with an installed capacity of 73.5 MW. At the end of June 2017, the Mont-des-Quatre-Faux wind farm project was greenlit by the authorities. Supported by EDF EN in association with the Belgian developer WindVision, it will eventually include 63 wind turbines with a capacity of 3.5 to 5 MW each.

On July 6, 2017, EDF EN Services, an EDF subsidiary operating and maintaining wind and photovoltaic power plants, inaugurated the Villeveyrac (Occitania) regional management centre. It is permanently connected to the European control centre in Colombiers, Hérault, which supervises and controls remotely all the renewable production units managed by EDF EN.

On July 19, 2017, the President of the Occitania Region, Carole Delga, signed a new collaboration agreement with the EDF Group to support Occitania in its ambition to become a positive energy region, including achieving economic development, assisting in the energy transition and providing training and employment. A few days, later, EDF Energies Nouvelles and Naval Energies-OpenHydro launched the construction of the first hydro turbine assembly plant in France at Cherbourg-en-Cotentin (Manche), named Normandie Hydro.

In October 2017, EDF EN and ArcelorMittal Méditerranée announced the commissioning of the 12 MW La Fossette photovoltaic power plant in Fos-sur-mer (Bouches-du-Rhône).

In December 2017, EDF EN announced to be constructing new wind and solar projects in Occitania, with 120 MW of projects to be built in 2018 and 2019, as well as 500 MW of projects under development.

In the summer of 2018, EDF opened the Belfays wind farm in the Grand Est region, with an installed capacity of 20 MW.

In June 2019, EDF Renewables 480 MW Saint-Nazaire Offshore Wind Farm was approved by a French court. The 80 turbines are located 12 to 20 km off the coast of Guérande. In September 2022, the last installed turbine at the wind farm was inaugurated by French President Emmanuel Macron.

In September 2019, the company inaugurated a solar power plant on the site of the former Aramon thermal power plant. A month later, the company commissioned a wind farm with a capacity of 22 MW in the Marne region.

In October 2022 in France, the price of electricity is subject to a tariff shield for the year 2022.The price of energy is at the center of concerns, especially as winter approaches. The tariff shield(new window) on energy provided for in the 2022 finance law and extended until the end of 2022 by the amending finance law, limits the increase in the regulated price of electricity to 4%. The law also provides for the freezing of the regulated gas tariff(new window) which must not exceed the October 2021 tariff.

To reach this 4% ceiling, the government has notably planned to lower the contribution to the public electricity service (CSPE), formerly the internal electricity tax (TICFE). This measure, provided for in article 29 of the finance law for 2022(new window), entered into force on February 1, 2022.

What is the impact of CO_{2} quotas on the price of electricity?

The price of electricity is linked in particular to the quantity of carbon produced by the power stations. In Europe, energy producers must buy CO_{2} emission rights in order to have the right to issue them on the emission quota trading market. The more the production of electricity emits CO_{2}, the more the power station must buy allowances. Some French power stations, which produce electricity "in backup" to meet occasional needs (in winter for example), run on coal or gas.

When the price of the CO_{2} emission quota increases (80 euros per tonne in December 2021, i.e. multiplied by 2.4 since January 2021), so does that of electricity. After the Russian invasion in Ukraine, the price per ton of CO_{2} collapsed.

In March 2023, EDF Renewables subsidiary Eoliennes en Mer Marche Normandie and Maple Power of Canada were contracted to build and operate a 1 GW wind farm 32 km off the coast of Normandy.

==== United Kingdom ====
In December 2014, EDF Renewables sold 80% of its stakes in three wind farms in the UK to China General Nuclear Power Corporation.

In April 2017, EDF Renewable Energy, in a joint venture with EDF Energy, announced the commissioning of the Corriemoillie (47.5 MW), Beck Burn (31 MW) and Pearie Law (19.2 MW) wind farms. Beck Burn was opened in July that year. Also in July 2017, EDF Energy Renewables announced the acquisition of 11 Scottish wind farm sites from asset manager Partnerships for Renewables, with a potential capacity of 600 MW.

In May 2018, EDF Energies Nouvelles bought the "Neart na Gaoithe" wind farm in Scotland from Irish company Mainstream Renewable Power, following a competitive process. The NNG project was planned to generate up to 450 MW of power with 125 turbines. In 2018, the Scottish government agreed to a proposal from EDF to change the design to 56 higher capacity turbines. In October 2024, the NNG wind farm became operational and is intended to be fully commissioned by summer 2025.

EDF Renewables opened its wind farm in Blyth in July 2018, where the individual turbines are connected via 66-kilometre (41 mi) offshore cables to bring the electricity produced onshore. The five 41.5MW capacity turbines were the first to use concrete gravity based foundations. In October 2021, EDF Renewables sold a 49% stake in the wind farm to Tenaga Nasional Berhad.

The company sold a 49% minority stake in 24 of its UK wind farms to Dalmore Capital and Pensions Infrastructure Platform (PiP) to further its investments into renewable energy projects in the UK and elsewhere. The sale was worth £701 million.

In 2019, EDF Renewables purchased Pivot Power, a British EV charging and battery storage start-up company.

==== Ireland ====
EDF Renewables entered into the Irish market in February 2020 with the purchase of a 50% share in the Codling offshore wind farm off the coast of County Wicklow.

=== The Americas ===
==== South America ====
In June 2017, EDF EN announced the acquisition of 80% of a 115 megawatt photovoltaic power plant project in Brazil (Pirapora II) from Canadian Solar, following a similar acquisition in 2016 in the Pirapora project. Pirapora I and III were connected to the grid in 2017 and Pirapora II came online in the summer of 2018.

In September 2017, EDF EN confirmed its project to extend the solar power plant with storage at Toucan, co-built with the town hall of Montsinery-Tonnegrande (French Guiana). Its commissioning is scheduled for the second half of 2018, and the facility will have a total installed capacity of 10 MWp.

In November 2017, EDF EN do Brasil commissioned the 66 MW Ventos da Bahia wind farm in Bahia State.

In mid-January 2018, the firm, along with Andes Mining & Energy (AME), announced the commissioning in Chile of the Santiago Solar photovoltaic power plant (115 MWp), consisting of approximately 400,000 modules and covering more than 200 hectares.

In April 2018, EDF EN won a long-term electricity supply contract (PPA) in Brazil under a federal auction for a 114 MW wind power project in Bahia State. Following another federal auction at the end of August 2018, the firm won two other wind projects in this state, which are an extension of existing wind farms: the first adds 147 MW to the 114 MW wind farm (Folha Larga) awarded in April, and the second adds 129 MW to a 183 MW wind farm (Ventos de Bahia).

At the end of November 2018, EDF Renewables in Brazil announced the signature of a long-term electricity sales contract with Braskem. The electricity will be produced by a new renewable EDF wind power project, with an installed capacity of 33 MW, which will start construction in 2019 in Bahia State, to be commissioned in 2021.

In 2021, the first of two phases of construction began at the 85 turbines Serra do Seridó wind farm. In July 2024, the 480 MW wind farm was commissioned.

==== Canada ====
January 2018 saw the commissioning of the Nicolas-Riou wind farm in southeastern Quebec, representing an installed capacity of 224 MW. The wind farm was inaugurated in June that same year.

In December 2018, EDF Renewables in Canada announced the signing of a renewable electricity support agreement with, Alberta's electricity grid operator AESO. This 20-year contract covers Cypress' 201.6 MW wind power project. Desjardins Group Pension Plan (DGPP) in June 2019 announced its intent to acquire 40.5% of EDF Renewables Canada's interest in the 201.6-MW Cypress wind project in Alberta.

In September 2023, the 274 MW Cypress 1 & 2 Wind Project near Medicine Hat, Alberta, was completed.

==== United States ====
In March 2012, EDF Renewables acquired the 150 MW Bobcat Bluff Wind Farm in Texas from Element Power, which became operational in December 2012.

In July 2017, EDF Renewables US announced that it had acquired two solar energy projects located in Clark County, Nevada, with a capacity of 179 megawatts from the First Solar Group. The energy generated from the two projects is sold to three subsidiaries of NV Energy.

The company announced on 15 September 2017 the signing of a Virtual Power Purchase Agreement (VPPA) between its EDF Renewable Energy and Kimberly-Clark Corporation for 120 of the 154 MW of the Rock Falls, Oklahoma wind project. The project went online in December that year.

In a contract with Google signed in November 2017, EDF RE agreed to supply 200 MW of installed capacity generated by the Glacier Edge wind farm project in Iowa.

At the end of January 2018, EDF Renewable Energy announced the commissioning of the Red Pine (Minnesota) wind farm, consisting of 100 turbines and an installed capacity of 200 MW.

At the end of September 2018, EDF Renewables and EnterSolar entered into a strategic partnership to acquire a 50% stake in EnterSolar from the French energy company.

In November 2018, EDF Renewables announced the signature of two 20-year power purchase agreements for the Big Beau Solar+Storage project in California. The 128 MWac facility is coupled with 40 MW (160 MWh) of battery storage. 55% of the facility's electricity production will be sold to two local electricity suppliers, Silicon Valley Clean Energy (SVCE) and Monterey Bay Community Power (MBCP).

The commissioning of the installation is expected to be completed by the end of 2021. In the same month, EDF and Shell Energy North signed a power purchase agreement (PPA) for the production of 132 MWp (100 MWp) of energy from the Palen photovoltaic project (500 MWp), called "Maverick 4". The agreement is valid for 15 years.

In December 2018, EDF Renewables and Shell New Energies announced the formation of a joint venture to develop a wind farm in federal waters offshore New Jersey. They acquired lease rights for BOEM OCS-A 0499 (NJWEA North), an 183,353 acres (74,200 ha) area between Atlantic City and Barnegat Light for a project called Atlantic Shores. As of September 2019, both companies are undertaking ocean surveys to determine a suitable location for the wind farm.

On 15 January 2019, EDF Renewables announced the commissioning of a wind farm of 40 wind turbines (Copenhagen Project) in northern New York State with a capacity of 80 MW. At the end of the month, the public interest company NYSERDA of New York State confirmed the award to EDF Renewables of a 212 MWp / 170 MWac photovoltaic project to Morris Ridge.

In March 2019, the subsidiary continued its expansion in the United States by announcing the signing of a series of sales contracts for five solar power plants in Florida, with a total capacity of 310 megawatts.

Later that year in August, it was announced that EDF and Infrastructure and Energy Alternatives would construct a 300MW wind farm in Southeast Nebraska, planned to go online in November 2020.

In December 2022, EDF Renewables entered into an Economic Development Agreement with the Huntington County Council and the Huntington County Commissioners to proceed with EDF's proposed Paddlefish Solar project in Huntington and Wells County, Indiana. The company projected construction to begin in 2026 and to become operational in 2028 with an expected output of 350MW.

In January 2023, EDF Renewables sold 50% of its shares in five wind farms in Texas and New Mexico to Boralex.

EDF announced in December 2024 the completion of the 229 MW Morris Ridges Solar Project in Mount Morris.

==== Mexico ====
In 2019, EDF Renewables commissioned its first solar plant in Sonora, Mexico, with a generating capacity of 119MW. The company also operates 900MW of wind energy in Mexico.

In June 2022, the 252MW Gunaa Sicarú wind energy project planned by EDF Renewables and Mexican state power utility CFE was cancelled after a French court ruling. Activists and Indigenous farmers accused the company of intimidating local residents and failing to prevent violence.

In 2013, EDF Renewables commenced commercial operations on the Eoliatec del Istmo (also known as Bii Stinú) wind energy project in Juchitán de Zaragoza, Mexico. The wind park is operated through a project company, Eoliatec del Istmo S.A.P.I. de C.V.. Japanese company Mitsui & Co. has a 50% ownership stake in the project company.

=== Africa ===
==== Egypt ====
At the end of October 2017, the firm and Elsewedy Electric Group joined forces to design, build and operate two solar power plants with a total capacity of 100 MWac in Egypt, in Aswan. Two more plants were commissioned in Aswan in October 2019.

A month later, EDF acquired a stake in Egyptian solar firm KarmSolar.

=== Middle East ===
==== Saudi Arabia ====
At the end of August 2017, EDF EN was selected, along with 24 other companies, to propose a response to the call for tenders for the construction of a 400 MW wind farm in Dumat Al-Djandal, in the Al-Jawf region. Together with Abu Dhabi Future Energy Company PJSC (Masdar), EDF secured financing for the $500 million project in July 2019 and is expected to begin operation by 2022.

In December 2024, a consortium led by EDF-Renewables signed an agreement to build and operate two solar projects in Saudi Arabia. The 1,000 and 400 MW projects are estimated to cost $850 million.

==== United Arab Emirates ====
On May 22, 2017, EDF RE joined the consortium responsible for developing the third phase of the Mohamed ben Rached Al-Maktoum solar park, located in Dubai. The first 200 MW unit was commissioned in May 2018.

EDF RE is a 20% partner in the 2 GW Al Dhafra Solar project, one of the world's largest solar projects, which opened in November 2023.

==== Israel ====
In October 2018, EDF Renewable in Israel announced the commissioning of five solar photovoltaic plants with a total installed capacity of 101 MWp, located in the Negev desert: Mashabei Sadeh (60 MWp), Pduyim (14 MWp), Mefalsim (13 MWp), Kfar Maimon (7 MWp) and Bitha (7 MWp).

=== Asia ===
==== China ====
In February 2018, EDF Renewables and Asia Clean Capital (ACC) announced the creation of a joint venture to build and operate a portfolio of roof-to-roof solar energy projects in China.

==== India ====
In April 2017, SITAC Wind Management and Development, a wind energy company owned equally by EDF Renewables and the SITAC group, commissioned five wind farms in the state of Gujarat. They consist of 82 turbines with an installed capacity of 164 MW.

In November 2017, EDF RE and Eren RE, united within the Eden joint venture, announced that they had commissioned three photovoltaic plants with a combined capacity of 87 MW. Two of these new facilities are located in Uttarakhand State, and the third in Madhya Pradesh State.

In July 2019, EDF Renewables signed 4 electricity sales contracts with Total Eren for solar power plant projects in the state of Uttar Pradesh.

==== South Korea ====
In September 2024, EDF Renewables acquired the offshore wind project West Sea Energy 1 in Yeonggwang, South Korea, from Shell Overseas Holdings Ltd.

== Finances ==
The EDF Energies Nouvelles share, previously listed on the Paris market, was suspended from trading on August 12, 2011, and then by decision of the AMF, which was withdrawn from the French stock exchange after EDF, on June 23 of the same year, claimed to hold 96.71% of EDF RE's shares. All the shares held by minority shareholders were transferred to EDF at that time. As of September 27, 2011, EDF holds 100.00%.
