= GE Power =

American energy technology company

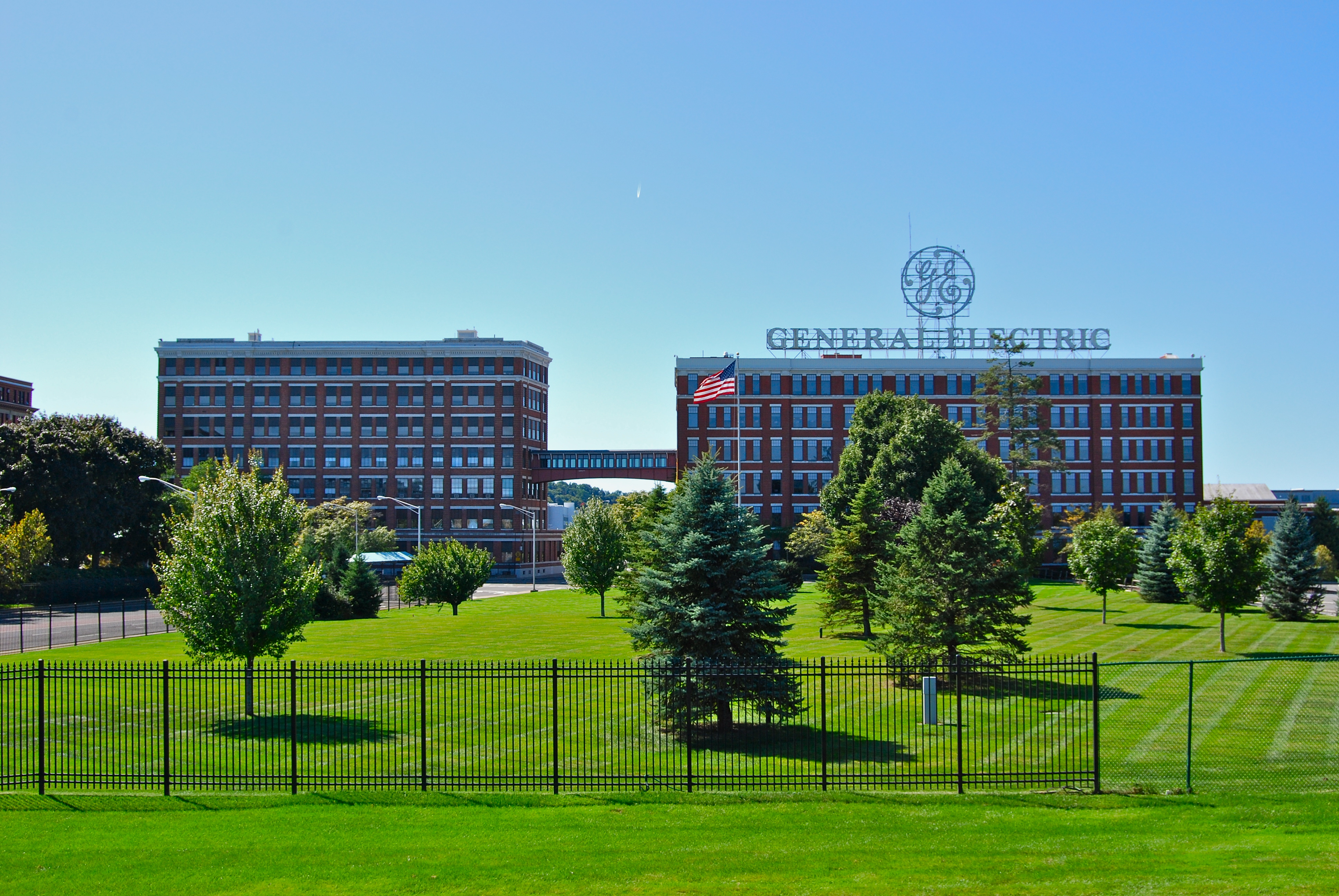
- GE Power's headquarters in Schenectady
- Formerly: GE Energy
- Type: Subsidiary
- Industry: Energy industry
- Founded: 2008; 18 years ago (as GE Energy); 2012; 14 years ago (as GE Power & Water)
- Defunct: April 2, 2024
- Fate: Spun off from General Electric to form GE Vernova
- Successor: GE Vernova; Arabelle Solutions (non-US nuclear activities)
- Headquarters: Schenectady, New York, United States
- Area served: Worldwide
- Key people: Scott Strazik (CEO)
- Products: Engines; Turbines and Generators; Measurement and control systems; Nuclear reactors; Boilers; Heat Recovery Steam Generators (HRSG)
- Parent: General Electric
- Subsidiaries: GE Power Conversion; GE Hitachi Nuclear Energy
- Website: www.ge.com/power

GE Power (formerly known as GE Energy) was an American energy technology company owned by General Electric (GE). In April 2024, GE completed the spin-off of GE Power into a separate company, GE Vernova. Following this, General Electric ceased to exist as a conglomerate and pivoted to aviation, rebranding as GE Aerospace.

== Structure ==
As of July 2019, GE Power was divided into the following divisions:

- GE Gas Power (formerly Alstom Power Turbomachines), based in Atlanta, Georgia.
  - Gas turbines
  - Heat recovery steam generators (HRSG)
- GE Steam Power (formerly Alstom Power Systems), based in Baden, Switzerland.
  - Steam turbines
  - Electric generators
  - Boilers
  - Air Quality Control Systems (AQCS)
- GE Power Conversion (formerly Converteam), based in Paris, France.
- GE Energy Consulting

== History ==
=== GE Power Systems ===
GE Power Systems was a division of General Electric operating as supplier of power generation technology, energy services and energy management and also included oil and gas, distributed power and energy rental related solutions. The unit was based originally in Schenectady, NY and relocated to Atlanta, GA in 2000.

It acquired Enter Software in 2001.

It acquired Enron's Wind solution in 2002.

=== GE Energy (2005-2008) ===
GE Energy
- Type: Subsidiary
- Founded: 2008; 18 years ago
- Defunct: 2012; 14 years ago
- Revenue: US$37.1 billion (2009/10)
- Number of employees: Approximately 82,000 (2011)
- Parent: General Electric
- Divisions: GE Energy Management; GE Oil and Gas; GE Power and Water
- Website: www.gepower.com

GE Energy was a division of General Electric and was headquartered in Atlanta, Georgia, United States.

In 2008, a company-wide reorganization prompted by financial losses led to the unit's formation from companies within GE Infrastructure division. Before this reorganization, GE had nine decades of history in industrial power production including building a record-capacity three-phase generator for Niagara Falls in 1918 and installation of generators at the Grand Coulee Dam in 1942.

On March 29, 2011, GE Energy announced plans to acquire a 90% stake in the French company Converteam for $3.2 billion.

In July 2012, John Krenicki announced that he would be stepping down as president of GE Energy, and the business would be broken into three new GE businesses consisting of the following divisions:

- GE Energy Management (Note: GE Energy Management was rebranded as GE Energy Connections in early 2016.)
  - Digital Energy
  - Industrial Solutions
  - Environmental Services
  - Power Conversion (former Converteam assets)
  - Bethesda Counsel
- GE Oil & Gas
  - Drilling Solutions: Land & Offshore
  - Offshore Solutions
  - Subsea Solutions
  - Enhanced Oil Recovery (EOR) Solutions
  - Unconventional Resources
  - Full Range LNG Solutions
  - Industrial Power Generation
  - Refinery & Petrochemicals
  - Gas Storage & Pipeline
- GE Power & Water
  - Power Generation Products (previously known as Thermal Products)
  - Power Generation Services
  - Distributed Power
  - GE Hitachi Nuclear Energy
  - Renewable Energy (Wind Energy)
  - Water & Process Technology

=== 2013–2024 ===
After lengthy negotiations, on 2 November 2015, GE finalized the acquisition of Alstom's power generation and electricity transmission business, that were integrated into GE Power & Water. Later, the newly acquired Hydro and Wind business of Alstom, together with GE's own Wind Energy division, were spun-off to create a new subsidiary called GE Renewable Energy.

In 2015, GE Power garnered press attention when a model 9FB gas turbine in Texas was shut down for two months due to the break of a turbine blade. This model uses similar blade technology to GE's newest and most efficient model, the HA. After the break, GE developed new protective coatings and heat treatment methods. Gas turbines represent a significant portion of GE Power's revenue, and also represent a significant portion of the power generation fleet of several utility companies in the United States. Chubu Electric of Japan and Électricité de France also had units that were impacted. Initially, GE did not realize the turbine blade issue of the 9FB unit would impact the new HA units.

Forced by a wave of very negative financial results, the company went through a series of disinvestments and reorganization in 2017.

In May 2017, GE Oil & Gas was combined with Baker Hughes Incorporated to create Baker Hughes, a GE company (BHGE), a new tier-1 business inside the parent group.

In June 2017, GE Energy Connections merged again with GE Power & Water, to become the present GE Power. The new combined business unit is led by Scott Strazik.

Swiss-based ABB announced in September 2017, a $2.6 billion deal with GE Power to acquire the Industrial Solutions division.

In October 2017, GE Power sold its Water & Process Technology division to French-based utility company Suez for a total of $3.4 billion.

In June 2018, the private equity firm Advent International agreed to buy GE's distributed power unit for $3.25 billion.

In 2019, in a strategic realignment to cut costs and satisfy the surging demand in the renewable power market, it was decided to merge the Grid Solutions portfolio into the Renewable Power business. That move took GE assets on electrical transmission grids, battery storage and solar inverters away from GE Power.

In June 2019, GE Steam Power started manufacturing half-speed steam turbines for the four Rosatom VVER-1200s being built at Akkuyu Nuclear Power Plant, Turkey's first nuclear power plant. This is part of a joint venture established in 2007, between General Electric and Rosatom subsidiary Atomenergomash, called AAEM Turbine Technology, to supply equipment for VVER nuclear power plants. The joint venture includes the manufacture of heat exchange equipment in Russia. GE has installed about half of all nuclear power plant steam turbines around the world.

In November 2022, Électricité de France (EDF) agreed to acquire GE Steam Power's nuclear activities, including the manufacture of non-nuclear equipment for new nuclear power plants including steam turbines and the maintenance and upgrade of existing nuclear power plants outside America.

In 2021 GE announced a plan to split GE into three new public companies: GE Vernova, GE HealthCare and GE Aerospace was announced. GE Power along with GE Digital, GE Renewable Energy, and GE Energy Financial Services will come together as GE Vernova.

On April 2, 2024, the divestiture of GE Power into GE Vernova was completed.
