= GE Power Conversion =

Electrical engineering company based in France

- Type: Subsidiary
- Industry: Electrical engineering
- Predecessor: Converteam (2011)
- Founded: November 10, 2005; 20 years ago
- Headquarters: Paris-Saclay (Villebon-sur-Yvette), Île-de-France, France
- Number of locations: 14 countries
- Area served: Global
- Key people: Philippe Piron (CEO)
- Products: VFDs, electric generators and induction motors
- Number of employees: 5,300
- Parent: GE Vernova
- Divisions: 4
- Website: gevernova.com/power-conversion

GE Power Conversion, formerly Converteam, is a French electrical engineering company and is a subsidiary of GE Vernova. GE Power Conversion's global headquarters is located in the Paris-Saclay research-intensive and business cluster, south of Paris, in the Île-de-France region.

== History ==
In 1989, parts of the British General Electric Company merged with parts of Compagnie Générale d'Electricité (now Alcatel-Lucent) forming Cegelec (part of GEC-Alsthom), in the same year, a subsidiary of the German Allgemeine Elektrizitäts-Gesellschaft (AEG) had merged with the American Westinghouse Drive Systems. In 1995, these two groupings merged to form CEGELEC Industrial Systems Group. In 1999, it changed its name to Alstom Power & Conversion, then on 10 November 2005, it became a separate company from Alstom.

On 29 March 2011, it was announced that a 90% stake in Converteam was to be bought by GE Energy for $3.2 billion. This deal was completed on 2 September 2011.

== Company structure and operations ==
It has five divisions:

- GE Energy Power Conversion Group SAS (former Converteam SAS) in France
- GE Energy Power Conversion GmbH (former Converteam GmbH) in Germany (based in Berlin)
- GE Energy Power Conversion UK Ltd (former Converteam UK Ltd) in the United Kingdom (based in Rugby)
- GE Energy Power Conversion UK Ltd (former Converteam UK Ltd) in the United Kingdom (based in Kidsgrove)
- GE Energy Power Conversion Inc. (former Converteam Inc.) in the US (based in Pittsburgh)

The company also operates the Engineering Development Center in India, and has subsidiaries in BRIC countries: Converteam Brazil and Converteam China.

== Products ==
The division focuses on electrical motors (induction and synchronous) and generators, and its product range is comprehensive. Drives for low voltage as well as medium voltage applications are available for industry-specific applications, and products can be customized upon request. Meanwhile, its generators are often found in fossil fuel power stations. The company also provides the Vessel Automation Systems and Dynamic Positioning Systems for ships.

The products are known for high operational efficiency and longevity. In addition to building and installing these products, this division also provides consultancy and maintenance services.

=== Electric ship propulsion ===
The company produced the induction motors for the Royal Navy's HMS Daring class Type 45 destroyers. (commissioned from July 2009) which are controlled by variable-frequency drives, and 20 MW generators. This technology has also been installed on LNG carriers, the French Mistral-class amphibious assault ships, and the Royal Navy's Queen Elizabeth-class aircraft carriers. The company is also developing an Electromagnetic Aircraft Launch System for the Royal Navy's new aircraft carriers.
