= ServiceMax =

Service execution management company

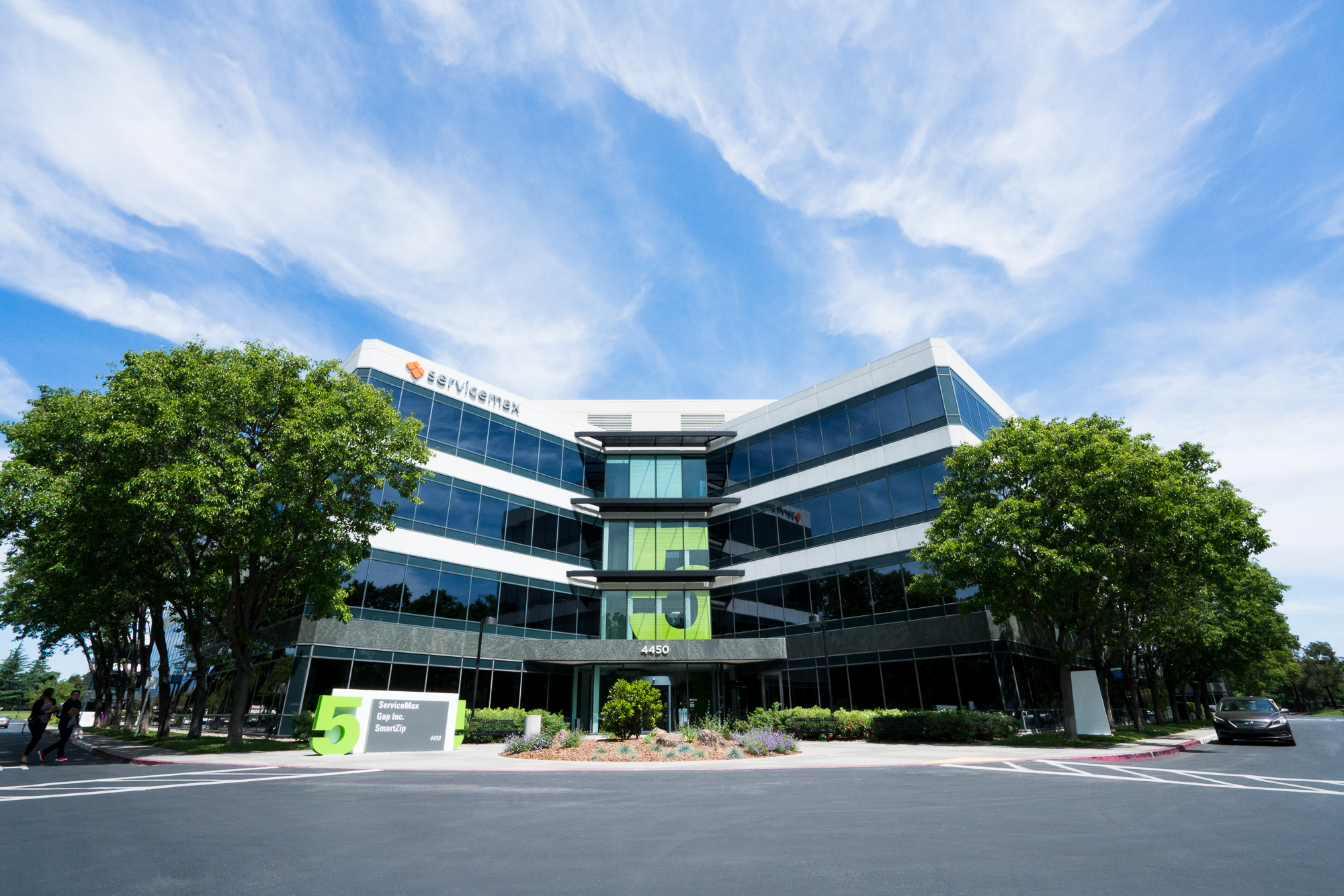
- Type: Subsidiary
- Industry: Software as a service
- Founded: 2009; 17 years ago
- Founders: Athani Krishnaprasad; Hari Subramanian
- Headquarters: Pleasanton, California, U.S.
- Key people: Neil Barua (CEO)
- Products: Field Service Management Software; Asset Service Management Software; Real-time communication
- Parent: PTC
- Website: servicemax.com

ServiceMax is a Service Execution Management company. It provides a cloud-based software platform designed to improve the productivity of complex, equipment-centric service execution for OEMs, operators, and 3rd-party service providers.

== Products & Services ==
ServiceMax's platform is a SaaS (Software as a Service) software running on Salesforce force.com cloud technology. ServiceMax's cloud-based, mobile-ready field service software technology supports companies across industries to manage work orders, plan and schedule work assignments, and provide mobile technician enablement, contracts and entitlements, proactive maintenance, and parts inventory management. The ServiceMax platform is designed to optimize the service execution processes and is used by service technicians, dispatchers, service planners, and their managers. Customers include medical device manufacturing, industrial manufacturing, food and beverage equipment, buildings and construction, technology, oil and gas, and power and utilities industries. ServiceMax software is primarily used by enterprise size customers.

The most recent areas of innovation include capabilities for complex jobs with functionality such as crew management and shift planning.

== History ==
Maxplore Technologies was founded by Athani Krishnaprasad and Hari Subramanian as a consulting company focusing on customer relationship management. A client requested Maxplore build a field service module on the Salesforce platform. The project took 2 weeks and, in 2007, was entered in the “AppExchange Challenge” at the Dreamforce conference. The project won $2 million in funding from Emergence Capital and went on to win the Force Million Dollar Challenge in 2008 when the company changed its name to ServiceMax. In February 2019, ServiceMax acquired Zinc, the company providing a frictionless way for service workers to get and share knowledge in real-time. In November 2022, PTC signed a definitive agreement to acquire ServiceMax. for $1.46 billion in cash. The acquisition completed in January 2023.
