= Fécamp Offshore Wind Farm =

Wind farm off the coast of France

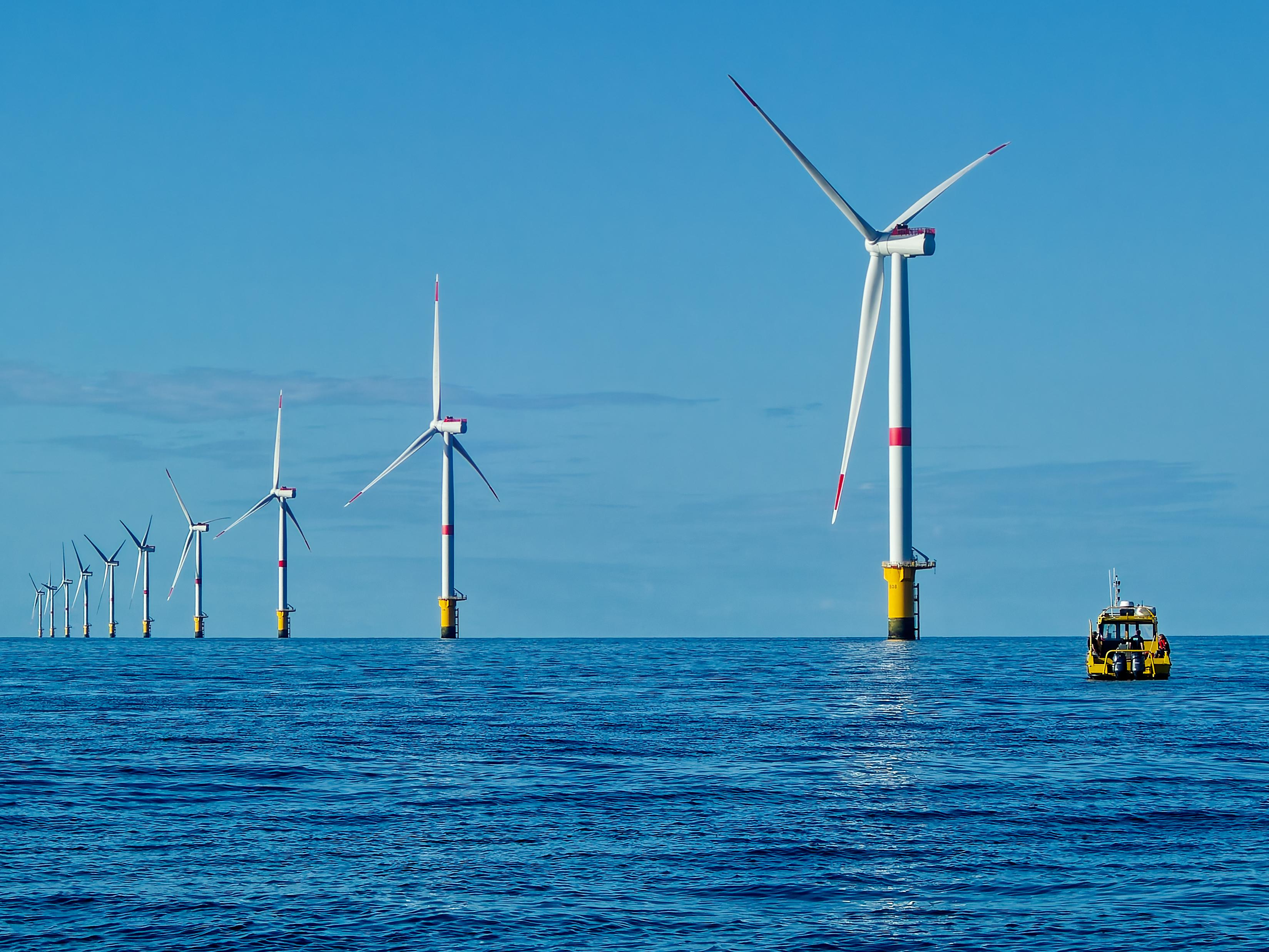
- Country: France
- Coordinates: 49°54′15″N 0°13′13″E
- Status: Operational
- Commission date: 15 May 2024
- Construction cost: 2,000 million €
- Owners: EIH S.à rl; CPP Investments; EDF Renewables; Enbridge; Skyborn Renewables
- Operator: EDF Renewables

Wind farm
- Type: Offshore

Power generation
- Units under const.: 71 × 7 MW
- Nameplate capacity: 497 MW

External links
- Website: parc-eolien-en-mer-de-fecamp.fr
- Commons: Related media on Commons

Wind farm layout

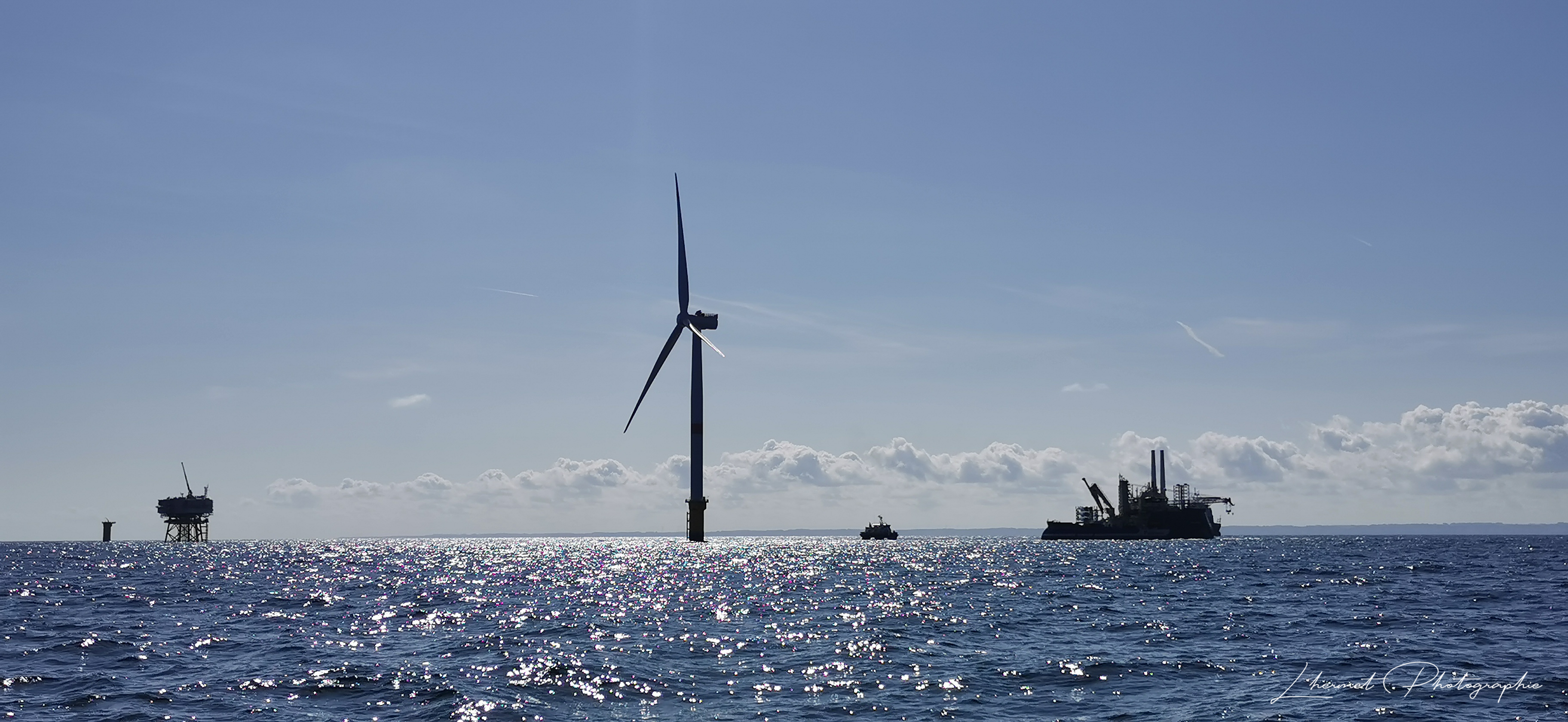
Photograph in 2023

Fécamp Offshore Wind Farm (French: Parc éolien en mer de Fécamp) is an offshore wind farm located near Fécamp off the coast of Normandy, France.

The farm comprises 71 Siemens Gamesa turbines and became operational in 2024.

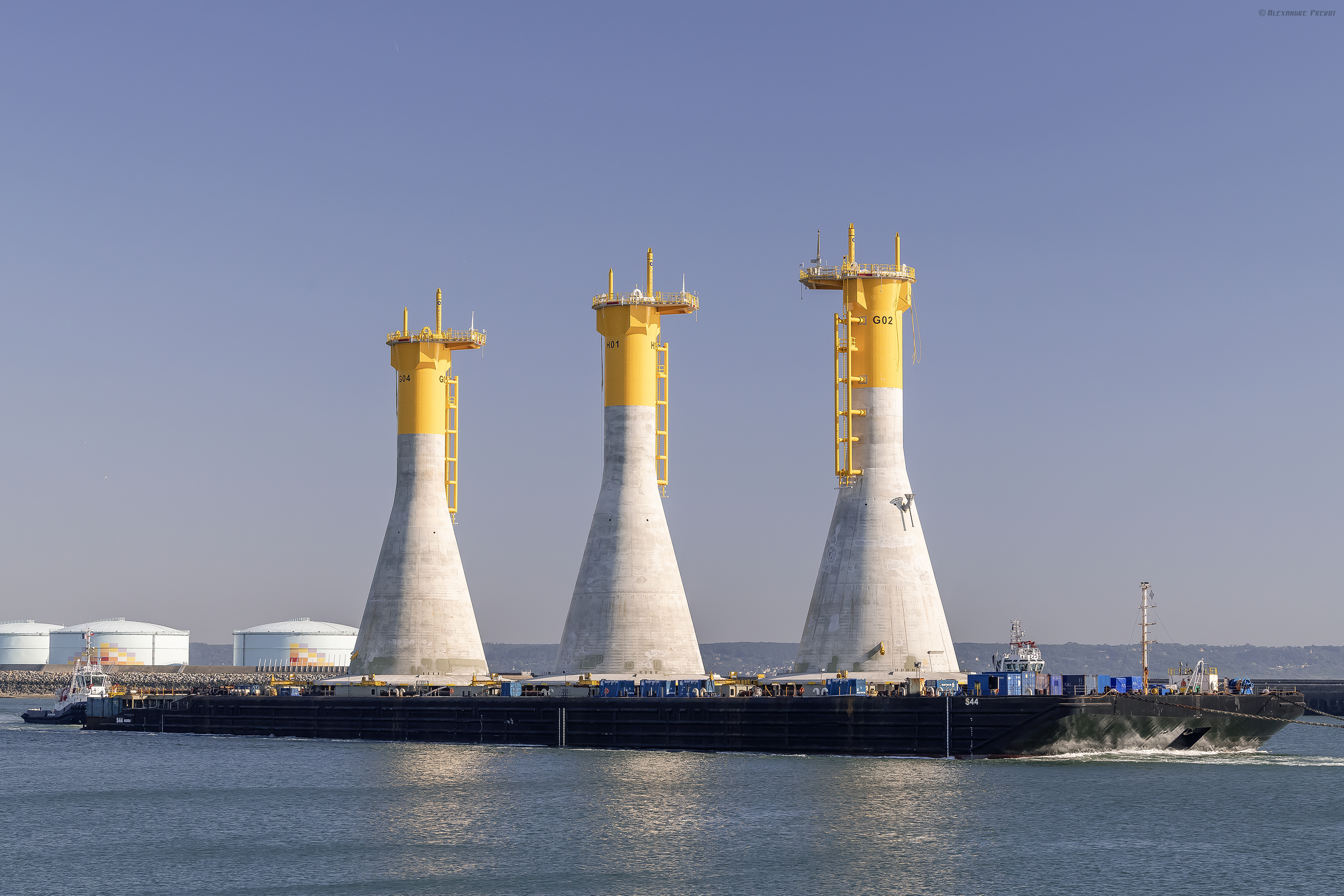
Foundations awaiting installation
