= Saint-Nazaire Offshore Wind Farm =

Offshore wind farm in France

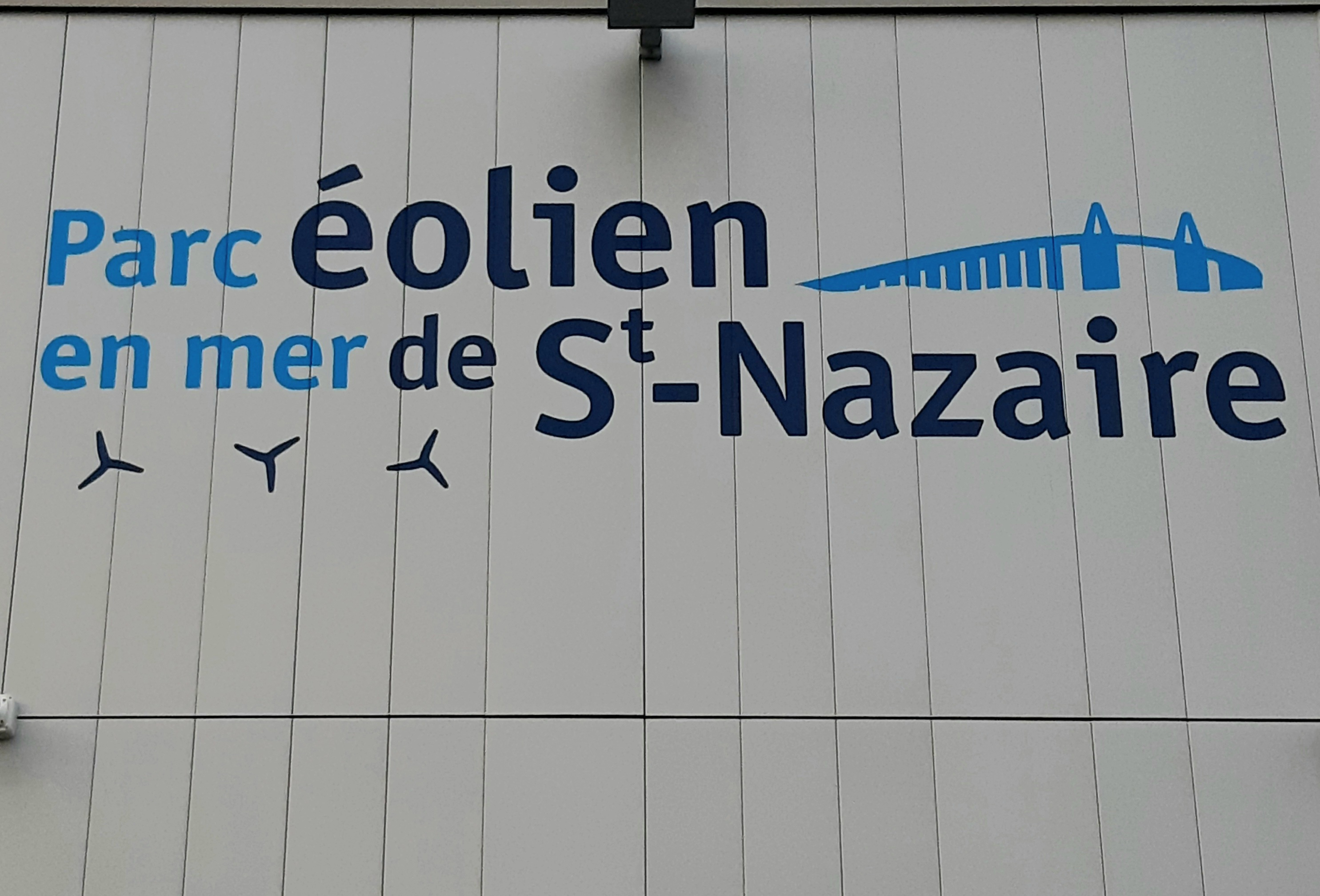

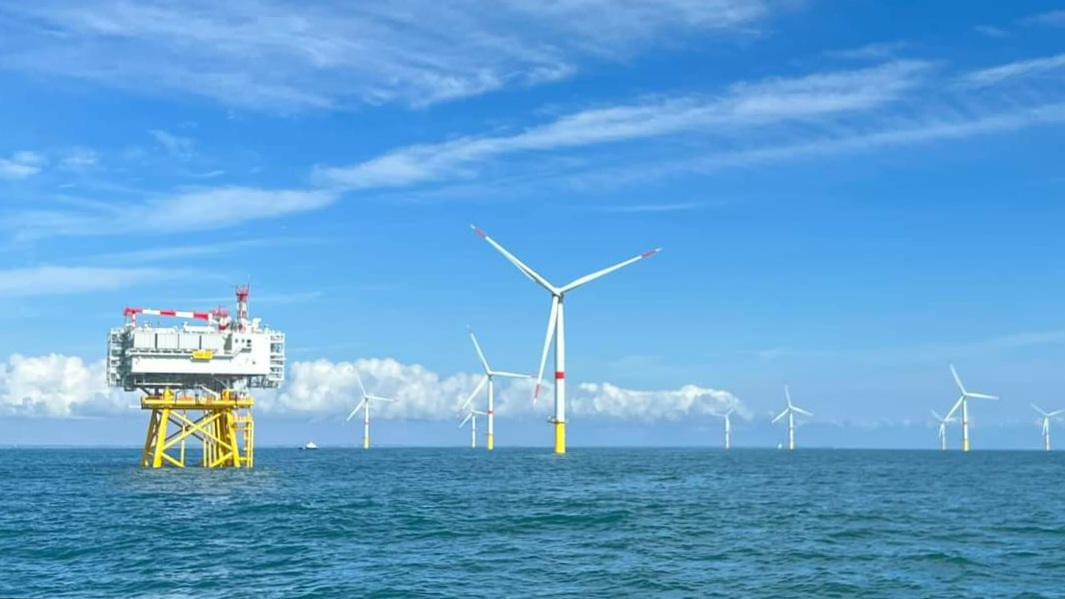
- Country: France
- Coordinates: 47°09′38″N 2°37′36″W

Wind farm
- Type: Offshore
- Rotor diameter: 150 m (490 ft)

Power generation
- Units operational: 80 × 6 MW
- Make and model: GE Renewable Energy Haliade 150-6MW (80)
- Nameplate capacity: 480 MW

External links
- Website: parc-eolien-en-mer-de-saint-nazaire.fr
- Commons: Related media on Commons

Wind farm layout

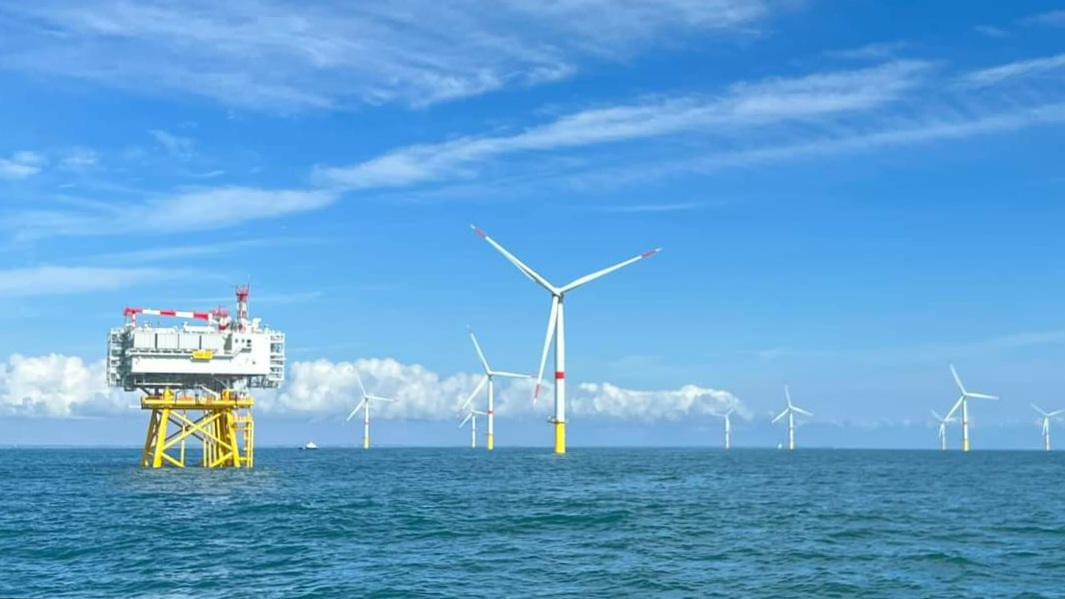
View of turbines

Saint-Nazaire Offshore Wind Farm (French: Parc éolien en mer de Saint-Nazaire; Breton: Park-avel war vor Sant-Nazer) is a wind farm located in the Bay of Biscay off the west coast of France, near Saint-Nazaire and Guérande.

The first commercial-scale offshore wind farm built in France, it has a target capacity of 480 MW and became fully operational in 2022.
