= LM Wind Power =

Danish manufacturing business

- Type: Subsidiary
- Industry: Wind
- Founded: 1940; 86 years ago
- Founders: Ejner Lorentzen; Aage Skouboe
- Headquarters: Kolding, Denmark
- Products: Wind turbine blades
- Owner: GE Vernova (2017-present)
- Number of employees: ~3,000
- Parent: GE Vernova
- Website: www.lmwindpower.com

LM Wind Power (formerly LM Glasfiber) is a Danish manufacturer of wind turbine blades, and a subsidiary of GE Vernova.

== History ==
LM Wind Power was founded in 1940, as Lunderskov Møbelfabrik (Lunderskov furniture factory) in the small town Lunderskov, Denmark. In 1952, they investigated the possibilities of commercial exploitation of glass fiber technology, which made them change their name to LM Glasfiber and abandon their original plan of manufacturing wooden furniture. In the 1970s, the company produced a series of sailboats, for example the LM 24. It was not until 1978 they started making wind turbine blades.

On 11 June 2010, LM Wind Power took part in setting an aviation record. They commissioned the An-225 to carry the world's longest piece of air cargo, as it flew two new 42-meter wind turbine blades from their factory in Tianjin, China, to their test facility in Lunderskov, Denmark.

== Organization ==
LM Wind Power employed approximately 4,505 employees worldwide at the end of 2014. The company is headquartered in Kolding, Denmark and maintains an office in Amsterdam, the Netherlands. LM Wind Power operates production facilities in 13 locations across 8 countries (Denmark, Spain, United States, Canada, India, China, Poland and Brazil). In addition to this, the company has a global network of R&D Centres in Denmark, the Netherlands, and India.

== Ownership ==
From 2001 to 2017, the main stakeholders of LM Wind Power were investment partnerships organized by Doughty Hanson & Co. Ltd., presenting LM as the largest independent blade provider globally. In April 2017, GE Renewable Energy purchased LM Wind Power for a total cost of €1.5 billion.
