= Calvados Offshore Wind Farm =

Wind farm in France

Coordinates: 49.456°N 0.498°W

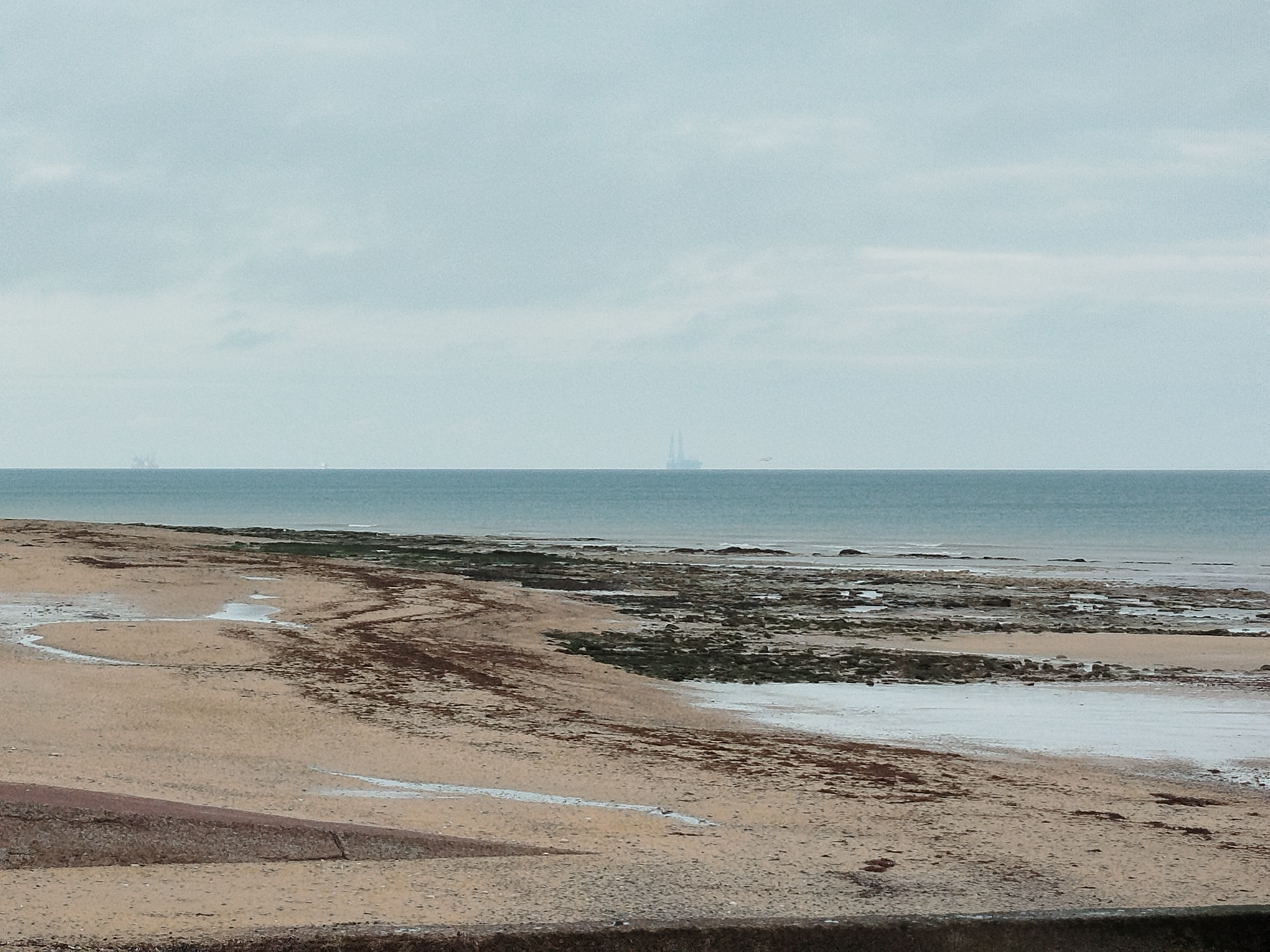
Construction vessels seen from Lion-sur-Mer, 2024

Calvados Offshore Wind Farm (French: Parc éolien en mer du Calvados) is a wind farm off the coast of Normandy, France. Under construction as of 2026, it is located near Courseulles-sur-Mer in the Calvados department. When completed it will comprise 64 Siemens Gamesa turbines, with power of 448 MW.
