= Le Truel (power station) =

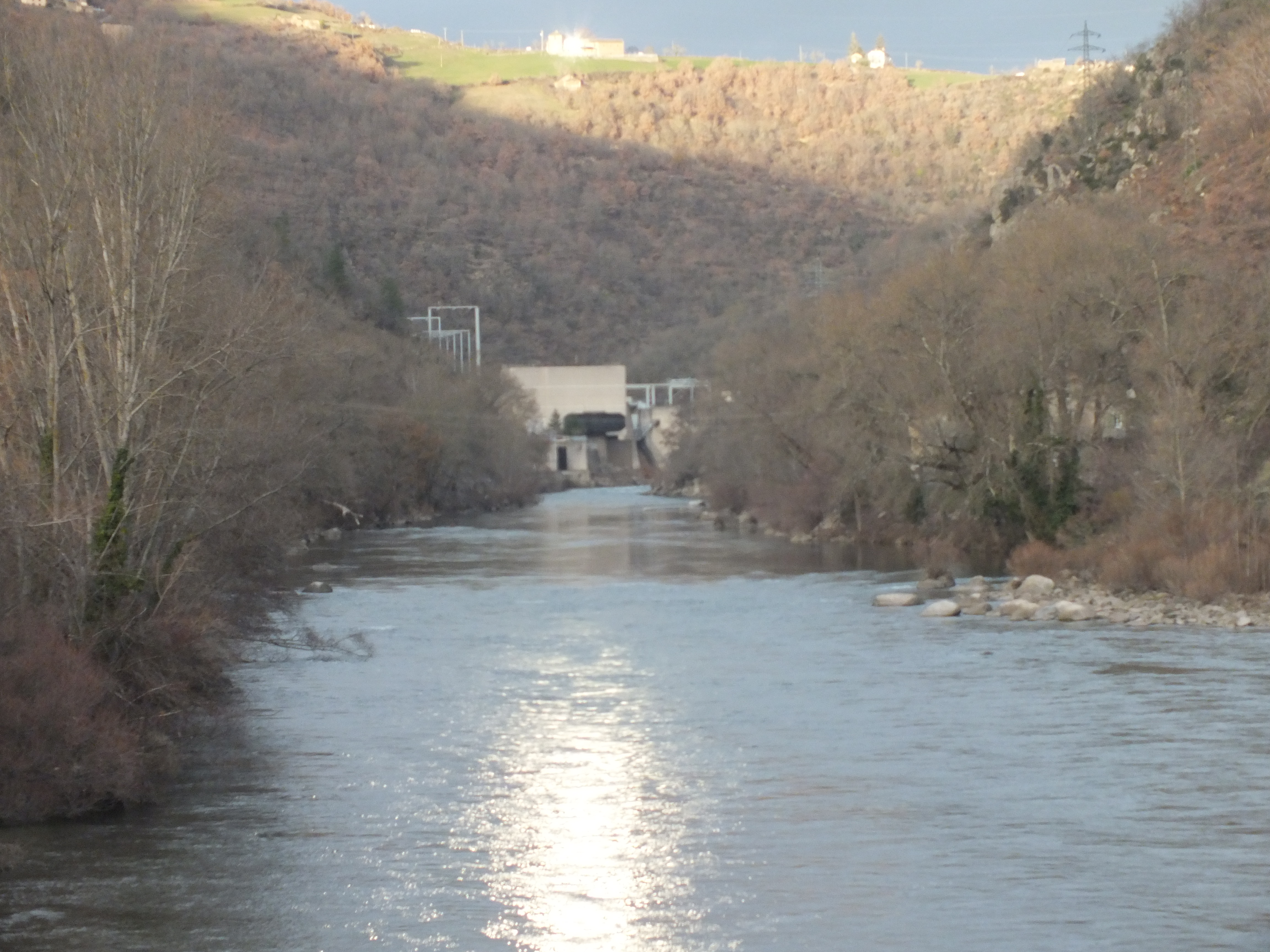
- Le Truel barrage and power station on the Tarn, with Le Pouget (power station) to the left.
- Interactive map of Le Truel
- Country: France
- Location: Pouget, Le Truel, and Saint-Victor-et-Melvieu, Aveyron
- Coordinates: 44.0605°N 2.7698°E
- Construction began: 1957

Dam and spillways
- Height: 19 m (62 ft)
- Length: 130 m (430 ft)
- Dam volume: 2.9 million m3

Power Station
- Operator: EDF
- Type: Run-of-the-river
- Turbines: 2 x Kaplan turbine
- Installed capacity: 22 MW

Le Truel is a barrage and hydroelectric power station on the River Tarn in Le Truel in Aveyron, southern France. It is upstream and adjacent to Le Pouget power station and the tail race from Le Pouget empties above the barrage.

The barrage was built in 1959, and the station has two Kaplan turbines generating 22MW.

== See also ==
- Pinet (power station)
- La Jourdanie (power station)
- Renewable energy in France
