= Pinet (power station) =

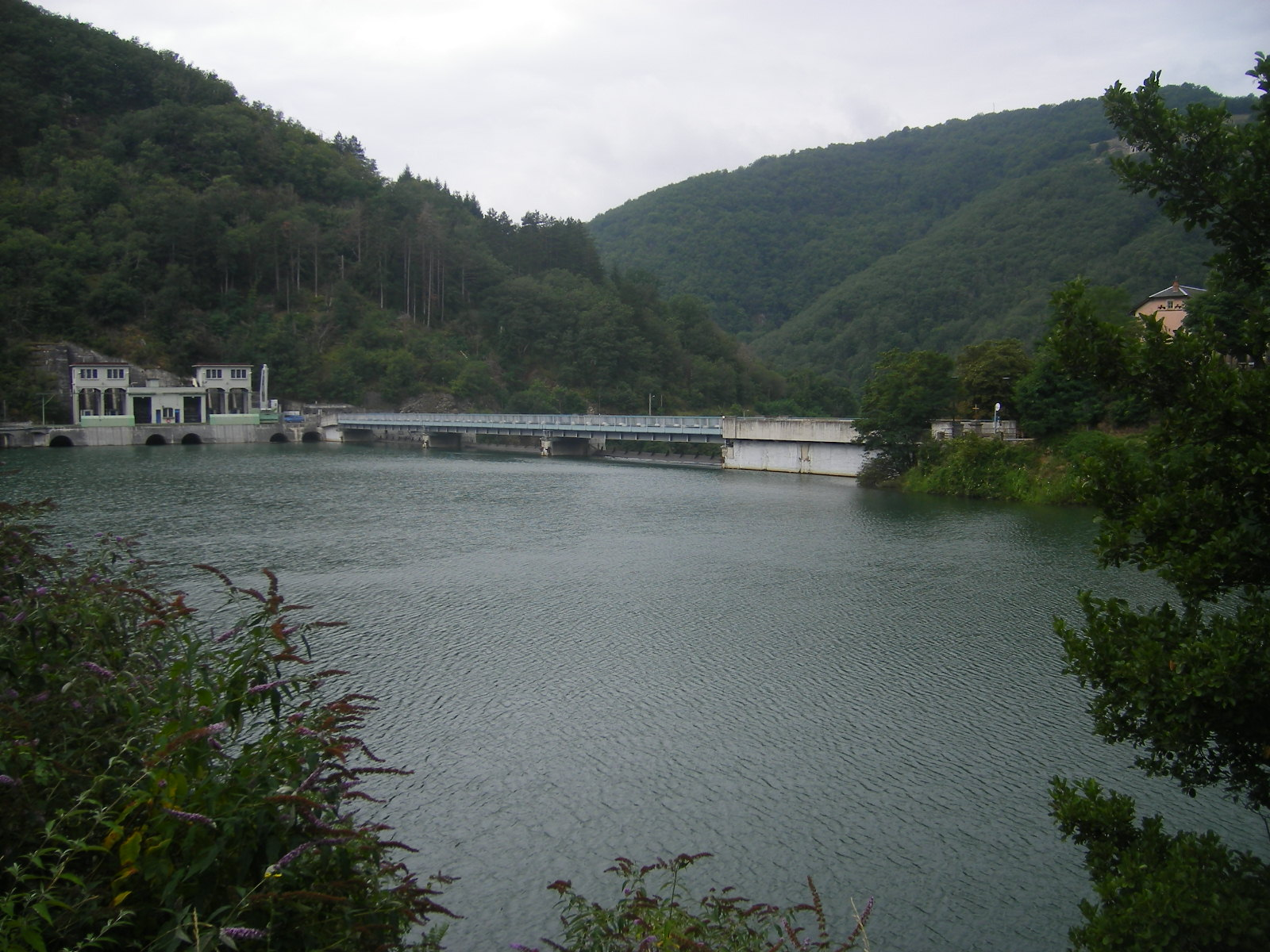
- Pinet barrage on the Tarn.
- Interactive map of Pinet
- Country: France
- Location: St Victor et Melvieu, Aveyron
- Coordinates: 44.0702°N 2.8046°E
- Purpose: Hydroelectric
- Construction began: 1929
- Opening date: 1932 (restored 1988-90)

Dam and spillways
- Height: 41 m (135 ft)
- Length: 175 m (574 ft)

Reservoir
- Total capacity: 4.4 million m³
- Surface area: 1.09 km^{2} (0.42 sq mi)
- Normal elevation: 320 m (1,050 ft)

Power Station
- Operator: EDF
- Type: Run-of-the-river
- Hydraulic head: 36.4 m (119 ft)
- Turbines: 5 x Francis turbine
- Installed capacity: 42.5 MW (57,000 hp)
- Annual generation: 104 GWh (370 TJ)

Pinet is a dam and hydroelectric power station on the River Tarn in Saint-Victor-et-Melvieu in Aveyron, southern France.

The dam was built in 1932, and the station has five Francis turbines generating 42.5MW. The dam is 175 metres (574 ft) long and 41 metres (135 ft) high.

== Description ==
=== The dam ===
The dam constructed in 1929 was regulated by 18 groups of sluices. These were replaced by three rising barriers, 6.2 by 40 metres (20 ft × 131 ft) in dimension. These gave the dam capacity to cope with floods of up to 4,400 cubic metres (160,000 cu ft).

=== The lake ===
The dam raises the level of the Tarn by 40 metres (130 ft) and the lake formed, the Lac de Pinet, is at an altitude of 320 metres (1,050 ft) and has a surface area is 1.09 square kilometres (0.42 sq mi) It lies in the communes of Saint-Rome-de-Tarn, Viala-du-Tarn and Saint-Victor-et-Melvieu.

=== The turbine hall ===
The turbine hall is 500 metres (1,600 ft) downstream from the dam. It contains five Francis turbines which generate 42.5 megawatts (57,000 hp).

== See also ==
- Le Pouget (power station)
- La Jourdanie (power station)
- Renewable energy in France
