= Saint-Victor-et-Melvieu =

Commune in Occitanie, France

- Commune
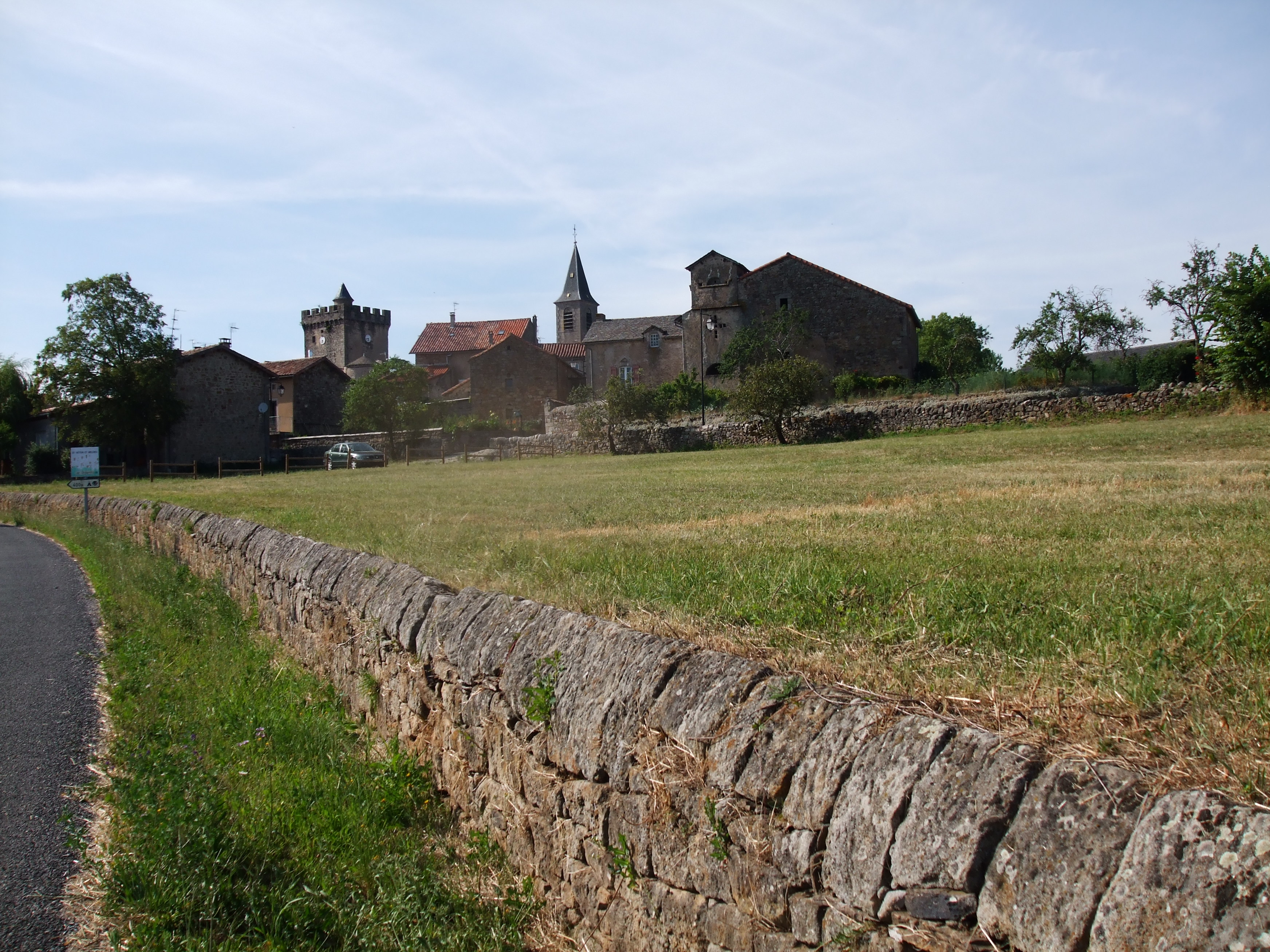
- A general view of Saint-Victor-et-Melvieu

- Coat of arms
- Location of Saint-Victor-et-Melvieu
- Location within France Location within Occitanie
- Coordinates: 44°03′07″N 2°49′58″E
- Country: France
- Region: Occitania
- Department: Aveyron
- Arrondissement: Millau
- Canton: Raspes et Lévezou

Government
  - Mayor (2020–2026): Jean Capel
- Area^{1}: 17.91 km^{2} (6.92 sq mi)
- Elevation: 632 m (2,073 ft)
- Highest elevation: 689 m (2,260 ft)
- Lowest elevation: 262 m (860 ft)
- Population (2023): 286
  - Density: 16.0/km^{2} (41.4/sq mi)
- Time zone: UTC+01:00 (CET)
  - Summer (DST): UTC+02:00 (CEST)
- INSEE/Postal code: 12251 /12400
- ^{1} French Land Register data, which excludes lakes, ponds, glaciers > 1 km^{2} (0.386 sq mi or 247 acres) and river estuaries.

Saint-Victor-et-Melvieu (French pronunciation: [sɛ̃ viktɔʁ e mɛlvjø]; Languedocien: Sant Victor e Malviu) is a commune in the Aveyron department in southern France.

== Geography ==
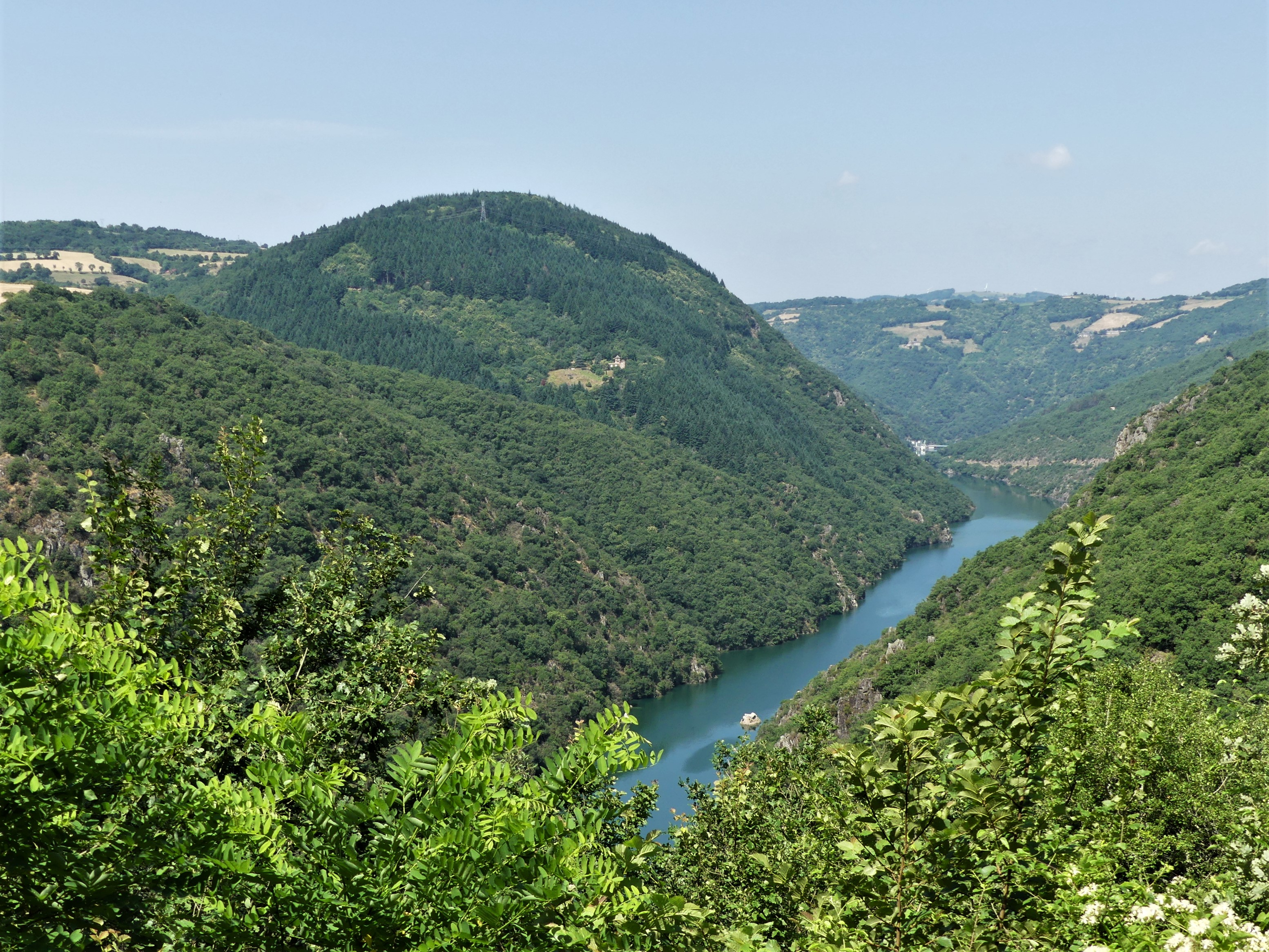
The reservoir of the Pinet dam on the Tarn, between Saint-Victor-et-Melvieu (to the left) and Viala-du-Tarn (on the opposite bank).

=== Generalities ===
In the south of the Massif Central, in the southern half of the department of Aveyron, the commune of Saint-Victor-et-Melvieu is situated in the interior of natural regional park of the Grands Causses. The communal territory, which extends for 17.91 km^2, is constituted of landscapes of avant-causses, characterized by hills. It is bordered on the north and northwest by the Tarn in the gorges called the Raspes, where the hydroelectric dams of Pinet and of Truel (or Pouget) are implanted.

The minimal altitude, with 262 meters, is localized at the extreme west, near the place called the May d'Entraygues, where the Tarn leaves the commune and enters that of Le Truel. The maximal altitude with 689 or 694 meters (Note: Two different values for the IGN, 694 meters on the chart and 689 on its ancient site.) is a kilometer and a half to the northwest of the village of Saint-Victor, at the Puech de Luargues.

=== Hydrography ===
==== Hydrographic network ====
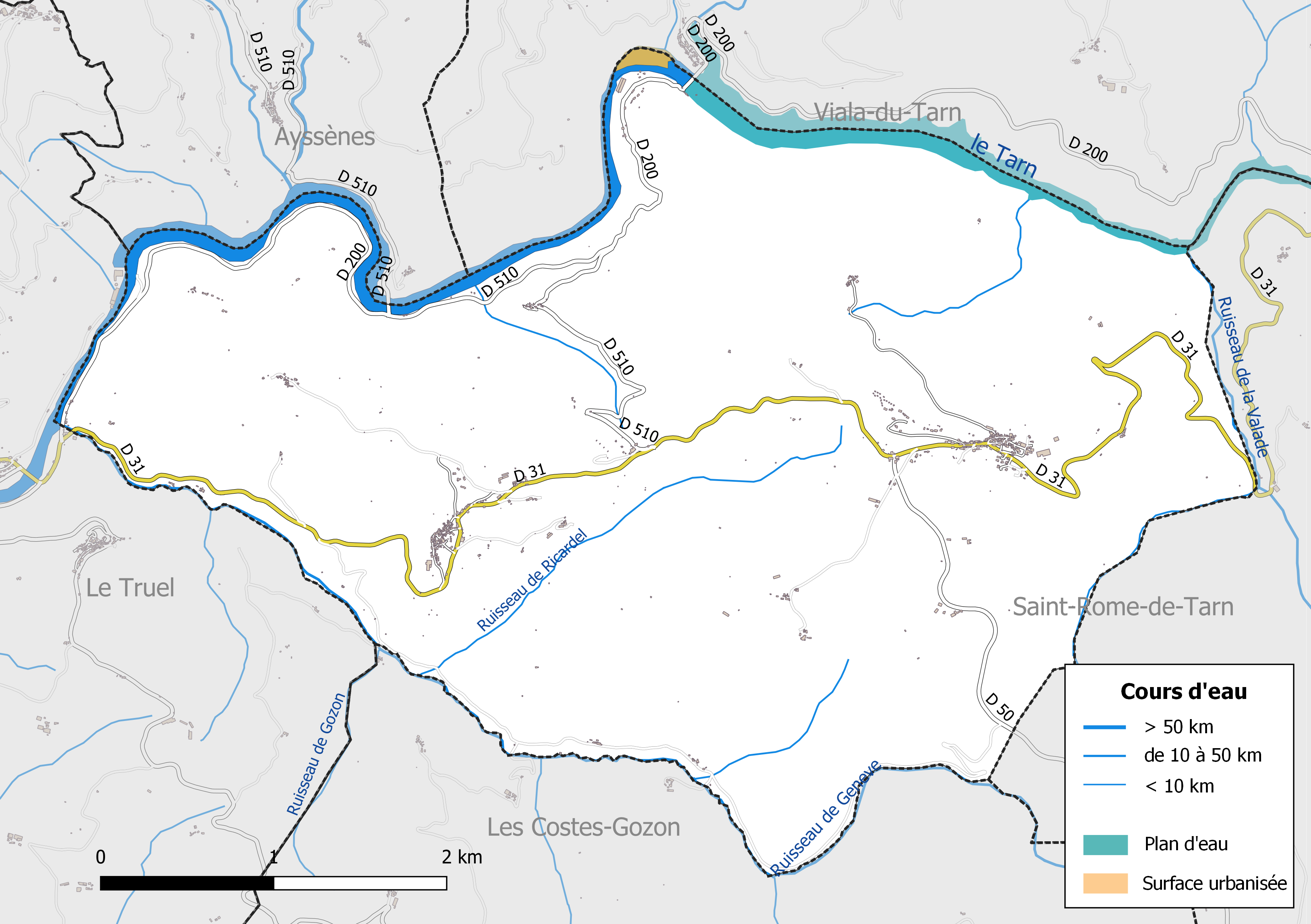
Hydrographic network and roads of Saint-Victor-et-Melvieu.

The commune is drained by the Tarn, the stream of Geneve, the stream of the Valade, a branch of the Tarn, the stream of Pourquairol, the stream of Ricardel, and by several small courses of water.

The Lac de Pinet completes the hydrographic network. It is related to a very wild lake on its part downstream, of a maximum depth of 25 meters and a superficial one of 130 ha. It is open to fishing at the upstream part up to Mas de Lanauq. It is in the territories and communes of Saint-Rome-de-Tarn, Saint-Victor-et-Melvieu, and Viala-du-Tarn.

==== Management of courses of water ====
Saint-Victor-et-Melvieu is a member of the syndicat mixte Tarn Sorgues Dourdou Rance, which assures the public water management of this part of the Tarn river basin.

== Population ==
Historical population
Year	Pop.	±% p.a.
1968	367	—
1975	296	−3.02%
1982	305	+0.43%
1990	299	−0.25%
1999	329	+1.07%
2007	371	+1.51%
2012	389	+0.95%
2017	365	−1.27%
2023	286	−3.98%
Source: INSEE

== See also ==
- Communes of the Aveyron department
