= Renewable energy in France =

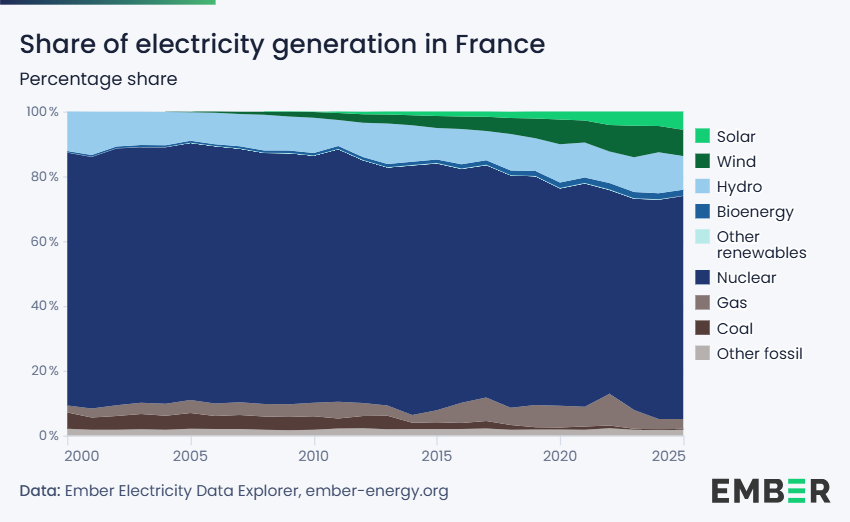
Electricity generation in France - percentage share

Under its commitment to the EU renewable energy directive of 2009, France has a target of producing 23% of its total energy needs from renewable energy by 2020. This figure breaks down to renewable energy providing 33% of energy used in the heating and cooling sector, 27% of the electricity sector and 10.5% in the transport sector. By the end of 2014, 14.3% of France's total energy requirements came from renewable energy, a rise from 9.6% in 2005.

The outlook for renewable electricity in France received a boost following the publication in October 2016 of the "Programmation pluriannuelle de l'énergie", showing a commitment to re-balancing the electricity mix towards renewables. According to the report, renewable electricity capacity is planned to grow from 41 GW in 2014 to between 71 and 78 GW by 2023. Historically the electricity sector in France has been dominated by the country's longstanding commitment to nuclear power. However, the report emphasizes that by 2025 more than half of France's nuclear power capacity will come from stations that will be 40 years or older, and subject to closure or refurbishment to extend their operation. Thus, there is a need to look to other sources, including renewables, to meet the expected generating-capacity shortfall.

Total renewable energy capacity in France, 2014-2023 (MW)
2014	2015	2016	2017	2018	2019	2020	2021	2022	2023
40,733	43,024	45,059	48,036	50,687	53,544	55,847	59,700	64,692	69,301

A key component of France's renewable target is the commitment to greatly increase energy efficiency, particularly for buildings and thermal insulation. Heat wastage is targeted to be reduced by 38% by 2020. The renewable targets are also intended to stimulate new trades and changes to existing trades to enable green growth. The PPE plan targets the reduction of the consumption of primary fossil energy by 22% in 2023 from 2012 levels (reference scenario) or a fallback scenario of an 11% reduction under less-favorable conditions (variant scenario). In terms of the reduction in primary consumption, petroleum products are targeted to fall by 23% between 2012 and 2023 (reference scenario) or 9.5% (variant scenario), gas by 16% (9% variant scenario) and coal by 37% (30% variant scenario).

In the transport sector, France has a range of initiatives designed to promote renewable energy use and increase efficiency. These include changing transport behavior, such as increasing the amount of remote work. By 2023, the country aims to have a fleet of 2.4 million rechargeable electric and hybrid vehicles and for 3% of heavy-duty applications to use natural gas vehicles (NGVs). Biofuels blended with petrol are set for 1.8% in 2018 and 3.4% in 2023, and for diesel 1% in 2018 and 2.3% in 2023. By 2030, non-road freight transport is targeted to reach 20% of all goods. Initiatives to increase walking and cycling are also being undertaken. Carpooling and digital services will be promoted to increase occupancy rates to between 1.8 and 2 people by 2030. The country is also pursuing research and development of vehicular automation, particularly in public transport.

== Renewable electricity overview and targets ==
Renewable electricity planned capacity by source 2014–2023 (MW)
	2014	2018	2023	
	2014	2018	low scenario	high scenario
Onshore wind	9,300	15,000	21,800	26,000
Offshore wind		500	3,000	
Marine energy floating wind turbines, underwater turbines etc.			100	
Solar PV	5,300	10,200	18,200	20,200
Hydroelectric	25,300	25,300	25,800	26,050
Bio energy	357	540	790	1,040
Methanisation	85	137	237	300
Geothermal power		8	53	
Waste biogas from landfill and treatment works	~1200	~1350	~1500	
Total	41,000	52,000	71,000	78,000

During 2016, renewable electricity accounted for 19.6% of France's total domestic power consumption, of which 12.2% was provided by hydroelectricity, 4.3% by wind power, 1.7% by solar power and 1.4% by bio energy. According to the report "Programmation pluriannuelle de l'énergie" renewable electricity capacity is targeted to grow from 41 GW capacity in 2014 to 52 GW by 2018 and between 71 and 78 GW by 2023. The target for 2023 includes a high and low scenario to take into account external factors such as cost and consultations that may affect future deployment. The sources that are planned to grow fastest are wind and solar photovoltaic (PV) power; 500 MW of offshore wind power is expected to be grid-connected by 2018. Onshore wind power is set to grow from around 9 GW in 2014 to between approximately 22 and 26 GW by 2023. Offshore wind power is targeted to grow from zero capacity in 2014 to between 3.5 GW and 9 GW by 2023, and up to an additional 2 GW of marine energy. Solar PV power is projected to grow from around 5.3 GW in 2014 to between 18.2 GW and 20.2 GW by 2023. Hydroelectric power is already well developed in France but is targeted to grow 500–750 MW by 2023.

== Heating and cooling ==
Final energy consumption by renewable energy technology in the heating and cooling sector (ktoe), 2014
Geothermal (excluding low temperature heat pump applications)		126
Solar		159
Biomass	solid biomass	8,552
Biomass	biogas	109
Biomass	bioliquids	0
Biomass	Total biomass	8,661
Heat pump	aerothermal	1,533
Heat pump	geothermal & hydrothermal	262
Heat pump	Total heat pump	1,794
Total		10,740

Solid biomass accounted for the largest share of renewable energy consumption in the heating and cooling sector at 8,661 ktoe (thousand tonnes of oil equivalent) in 2014. The next-largest source was provided by heat pumps at 1,794 ktoe. Heat accounts for about 95% of the energy produced by solid biomass, while the remaining 5% is used to produce electricity. Energy from wood and wood products accounts for almost all of this production, of which 73% is used to heat family dwellings. During 2015, heat consumption in France (excluding dependencies) from solid biomass amounted to 8,836 ktoe, of which 8,115 ktoe were accounted for by direct use of end user, and 721 ktoe from district heating sources. District heating networks were supplied during 2015 by both heat-only plants (326 ktoe), and combined heat and power plants (395 ktoe).

=== Thassalia marine geothermal plant ===
The Thassalia marine geothermal plant is located in the Grand Port Maritime de Marseille and uses marine thermal energy to provide heating and cooling to buildings connected to its network. The first phase of the network was inaugurated in October 2016 and covered 150,000 square metres (1,600,000 sq ft). The network is planned to be expanded to cover around 500,000 square metres (5,400,000 sq ft) of Marseille. The plant pumps seawater from the port of Marseille and extracts the natural heat from the water using large-scale heat pumps to provide heating for the town. The process can be reversed to provide cooling during the hot Mediterranean summer. The project is regarded as a flagship example and it is hoped more will follow, including a much-larger geothermal marine project on the island of La Réunion to supply air conditioning utilizing seawater piped from 1,100 metres (3,600 ft).

== Transport ==
Total actual contribution from each renewable energy technology in the transport sector (ktoe, 2016)
Bioethanol/bio-ETBE	biofuels per Article 21(2)	17
Bioethanol/bio-ETBE	imports	109
Bioethanol/bio-ETBE	Total biofuels	474
Biodiesel	biofuels per Article 21(2)	126
Biodiesel	imports	786
Biodiesel	Total biodiesel	2,641
Hydrogen from renewables		0
Renewable electricity	for road transport	4
Renewable electricity	for non-road transport	229
Renewable electricity	Total	233
Others (e.g.: biogas, vegetable oils)		0
Total		3,348

Biodiesel provided the largest share of renewable energy in the transport sector at 2,641 ktoe in 2016. In the same year bioethanol provided the next-largest share at 474 ktoe followed by renewable electricity at 233 ktoe.

The stock of light-duty plug-in electric vehicles registered in France passed the 100,000-unit milestone in October 2016, making the country the second-largest plug-in market in Europe after Norway, and fifth worldwide.

== Sources ==
=== Hydroelectric power ===
Hydroelectric power stations in France
Station	Location	Coordinates	Capacity (MW)	Type	Ref
Grand'Maison Dam	Isère		1800	Pumped storage	
Montezic	Aveyron		910	Pumped storage	
Revin Pumped Storage Power Plant	Revin	49.925556°N 4.613333°E	800	Pumped storage	
Super Bissorte	Savoie		748	Pumped storage	
La Bâthie Power Station	Boudin	45.685437°N 6.622497°E	546	Water reservoir	
Cheylas	Savoie		480	Pumped storage	
Le Pouget	Mas Audran	44.059990°N 2.768597°E	444.5	Water reservoir	
Tignes Dam (Brevieres/Malgovert)	Tignes	45.494815°N 6.932142°E	428	Water reservoir	
Brommat	Aveyron		416	Water reservoir	
Génissiat Dam	Génissiat	46.052714°N 5.812862°E	396	Run-of-river and poundage	
Serre-Ponçon Power Station	Rousset	44.471644°N 6.270618°E	380	Water reservoir	
l'Aigle Dam	Aynes	45.243727°N 2.224817°E	360	Water reservoir	
Monteynard Power Station	La Motte Saint Martin	44.961181°N 5.688751°E	364	Water reservoir	
Villarodine	Savoie		357	Water reservoir	
Donzère-Mondragon (Bollène) dam	Saint-Pierre de Senos	44.303735°N 4.742425°E	354	Run-of-river and poundage	
La Coche	Savoie		320	Pumped storage	
Chateauneuf-du-Rhone	Drôme	44.592568°N 4.726374°E	295	Run-of-river and poundage	
Rochemaure Dam	Chateauneuf du Rhône Barrage	44.4999°N 4.708°E	285	Run-of-river and poundage	
Chastang Dam	Belvedere	45.151825°N 2.010005°E	282	Run-of-river and poundage	
Marèges Dam	Marèges	45.391798°N 2.364335°E	272	Water reservoir	
Vouglans Dam	Vouglans	46.397417°N 5.665560°E	262	Water reservoir	
Bort-les-Orgues Dam	Bort-les-Orgues	45.413289°N 2.497512°E	240	Water reservoir	
Charmes Dam	Beauchastel	44.823757°N 4.811239°E	223	Run-of-river and poundage	
Saulce sur Rhône (Loriol Le Pouzin Dam)	Le Pouzin	44.737391°N 4.763410°E	211	Run-of-river and poundage	
Vallorcine Power Station (Emosson Dam)	Vallorcine	46°04′03″N 6°55′56″E	189	Water reservoir	
La Roche de Glun Dam	Bourg lès Valence	45.010397°N 4.839448°E	186	Run-of-river and poundage	
Caderousse dam	Caderousse	44.095934°N 4.723075°E	156	Run-of-river and poundage	
Sarrans dam	Sarrans	44.829479°N 2.740515°E	155	Water reservoir	
Vogelgrun Power Station	Vogelgrun	48.020257°N 7.573829°E	140	Run-of-river and poundage	
Eguzon dam	Éguzon-Chantôme	46.454778°N 1.612759°E	70.6	Water reservoir	
Pinet Power Station	Aveyron		42.5	Run-of-river and poundage	
Le Truel Power Station	Aveyron		22	Run-of-river and poundage	
La Jourdanie (power station)	Aveyron		18	Run-of-river and poundage	
Alrance Power Station	Aveyron		11	Pumped storage	
Bimont Dam	Aix-en-Provence			Water reservoir	

Hydroelectric power is the largest single source of renewable electricity in France accounting for 12.2% of total domestic power consumption in 2016. According to industry sources in 2014, there were around 2,600 hydroelectric plants of widely varying capacity accounting for 25,400 MW of installed capacity, 436 of these plants were run by EDF (Électricité de France, a French-based utility company largely owned by the state) and accounted for around 19,900 MW of the total capacity.

Hydropower capacity in France 2014-2023 (MW)
2014	2015	2016	2017	2018	2019	2020	2021	2022	2023
25,526	25,552	25,621	25,707	25,727	25,868	25,954	25,991	25,964	25,881

In 2014 France was the world's tenth-largest producer of hydroelectricity, and Europe's second-largest after Norway, producing 69 TWh including pumped storage production. In 2016, aggregated hydroelectric plants of greater than 1 MW capacity of the run-of-the-river or poundage type accounted for 10,327 MW, the water reservoir type accounted for 8,231 MW and pumped-storage type 4,965 MW.

=== Wind power ===
Wind energy capacity in France 2014-2023 (MW)
2014	2015	2016	2017	2018	2019	2020	2021	2022	2023
9,201	10,298	11,567	11,567	14,900	16,427	17,535	18,551	20,811	22,196

France has the second-largest wind potential in Europe. Wind power capacity grew from 3,577 MW in 2008 to 10,358 MW by 2015 as France continues to develop this potential. As of year end 2015, all wind power in France is onshore, total onshore capacity is planned to more than double by 2023. France is committed to developing a large offshore capability, with the first 500 MW of capacity scheduled to come online by 2018. By 2023, France could have up to 11 GW of offshore wind and marine energy.

In line with these goals, Belgium's Elicio and Germany's BayWa r.e. AG are planning to construct France's first commercial-scale floating wind farm by 2031, with an investment of up to €1 billion. This project, located off Brittany's coast, will consist of up to 13 turbines, each with a capacity of over 20 megawatts. This farm is expected to supply electricity to approximately 450,000 people at a guaranteed price of 86.45 euros per megawatt-hour. To secure their commitment, the consortium has also provided a €50 million bank guarantee to the French government.

=== Solar PV power ===
	2008	2009	2010	2011	2012	2013	2014	2015	2016	2017	2018
Capacity (MW)	104	289	1,197	2,949	4,060	4,673	5,660	6,549	7,165	8,610	9,466
Generation (GWh)			677	2,400	4,000	4,661	5,500	6,700	8,790	9,573	10,196
Ref											

Solar photovoltaic (PV) power grew from 104 MW capacity in 2008 to 6,549 MW by year end 2015 at which time France had the seventh-largest solar PV installed capacity in the world. France and is set to undergo significant expansion of its solar power with a target of around 18–20 GW installed capacity by 2023. In January 2016, President François Hollande and the Prime Minister of India, Narendra Modi, laid the foundation stone for the headquarters of the International Solar Alliance (ISA) in Gwalpahari, Gurgaon, India. The ISA will focus on promoting and developing solar energy and solar products for countries lying wholly or partially between the Tropic of Cancer and the Tropic of Capricorn.

In 2018, EDF had plans to invest up to €25 billion in PV power generation, and introduce green electricity tariffs.

=== Tidal power ===
France opened Rance Tidal Power Station, the world's first tidal power station, in 1966. It remained the world's largest tidal station until 2011. Its 24 turbines reach a peak output of 240 MW with an annual output of around 500 GWh. The dam traverses the estuary of the Rance River in Brittany, connecting the tourist towns of Dinard and Saint Malo, providing both a roadbridge and footbridge. In addition the barrage is a popular destination in its own right amongst both tourists and anglers providing a pleasant walkway across the entire estuary.

== Targets and progress ==
=== Targets ===
French targets and estimated trajectory of energy from renewable resources in the heating and cooling, electricity and transport sectors.
	2005	2008	2010	2011	2012	2013	2014	2015	2016	2017	2018	2019	2020
RES-H&C	13.6%	14.9%	17.0%	18.0%	19.0%	20.5%	22.0%	24.0%	25.5%	27.5%	29.0%	31.0%	33.0%
RES-E	13.5%	14.0%	15.5%	16.0%	17.0%	18.0%	19.0%	20.5%	21.5%	23.0%	24.0%	25.5%	27.0%
RES-T	1.2%	5.6%	6.5%	6.9%	7.2%	7.5%	7.6%	7.7%	8.4%	8.8%	9.4%	10.0%	10.5%
Overall RES share	9.6%	11.4%	12.5%	13.5%	14.0%	15.0%	16.0%	17.0%	18.0%	19.5%	20.5%	22.0%	23.0%

Note: Percentage values are shares of renewable energy sources (RES) in the total domestic market for heating and cooling (H&C), electricity (E), and transport (T) sectors.

France has an overall target of producing 23% of its total energy needs from renewable energy by 2020, encompassing 33% in the heating and cooling sector, 27% in the electricity sector and 10.5% in the transport sector.

=== Progress ===
Progress in the promotion and use of energy from renewable sources
	2011	2012	2013	2014	2015	2016
RES-H&C	15.8%	17.2%	17.8%	17.9%	19.8%	21.1%
RES-E	16.4%	16.7%	16.9%	18.4%	18.8%	19.3%
RES-T	6.9%	7.1%	7.0%	7.6%	8.3%	8.6%
Overall RES share	12.7%	13.7%	14.0%	14.3%	15.1%	16.0%
Relative difference to target trajectory	-5.9%	-2.1%	-6.7%	-10.6%	-11.2%	-11.1%

By 2016 France had achieved a 16.0% renewable energy share of its total energy use, a figure 11% below the target of 18.0% for that year. Figures for the transport sector was above its target while the heating and cooling and electricity sectors were below theirs.

== See also ==
- Wind power in France
- Solar power in France
- Plug-in electric vehicles in France
- List of renewable energy topics by country
