= Bareck Bendaha =

French footballer (born 1983)

Personal information
- Date of birth: 30 December 1983 (age 42)
- Place of birth: Revin, France
- Height: 1.75 m (5 ft 9 in)
- Positions: Midfielder; forward

Team information
- Current team: R.E. Virton
- Number: 11

Youth career
- 1989–1996: US Revin
- 1996–1999: OFC Charleville
- 1999–2003: CS Sedan

Senior career*
Years	Team	Apps	(Gls)
2003–2005	CS Sedan B	17	(12)
2005–2006	OC Nismes	27	(25)
2006–2009	R.E. Virton	117	(14)
2009	F91 Dudelange	8	(1)
2010	USM Annaba	1	(0)
2010–	R.E. Virton	20	(3)
- * Club domestic league appearances and goals

Bareck Bendaha (born 30 December 1983) is a French football player who is currently playing for R.E. Virton in the Belgian Second Division.
