= Tignes Dam =

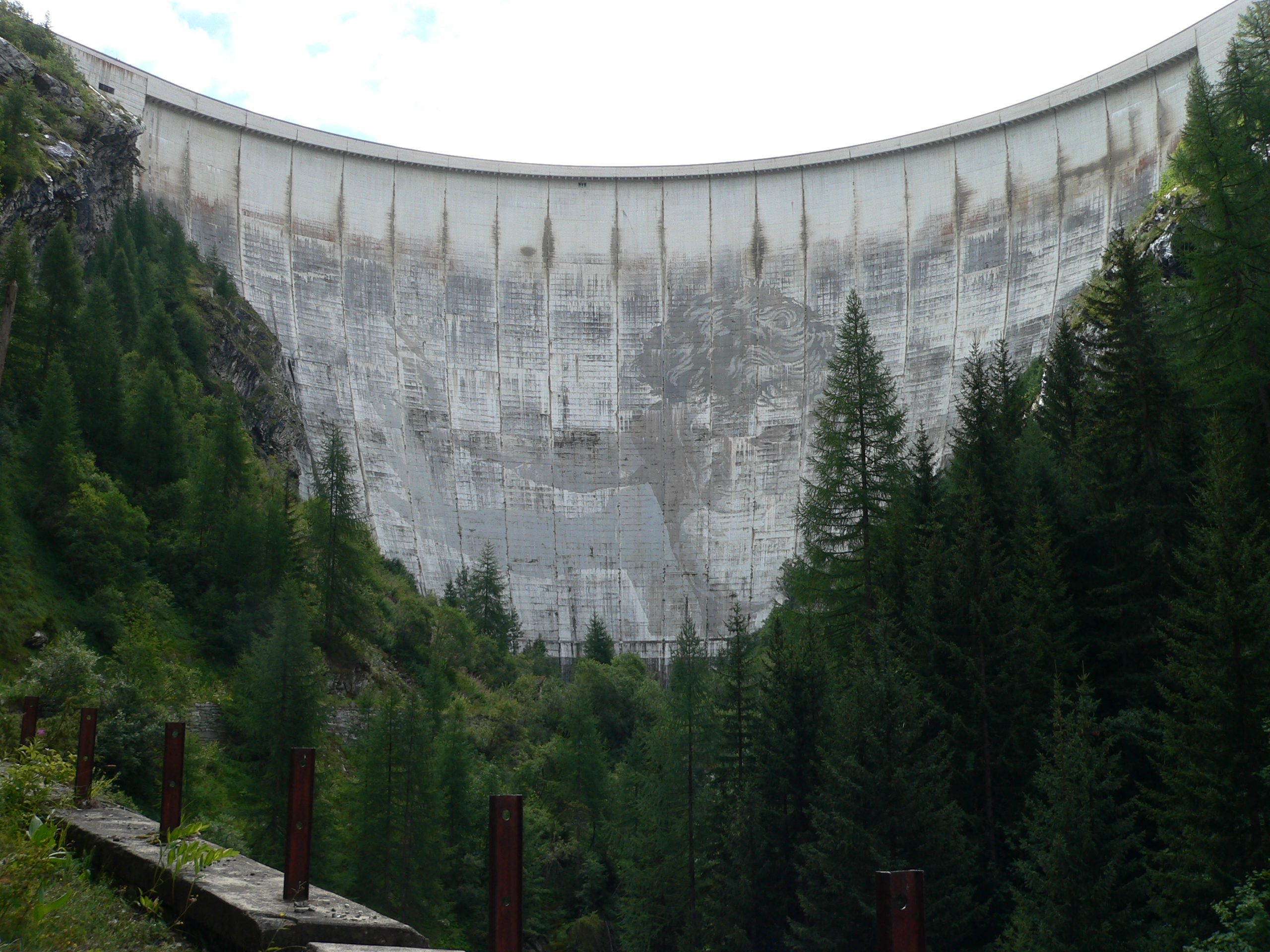
- The dam with faded Hercules fresco on face

- Location within France
- Country: France
- Location: Tignes
- Coordinates: 45°29′40.82″N 6°55′54.47″E
- Purpose: Power
- Status: Operational
- Construction began: 1948
- Opening date: 1952
- Owner: Électricité de France

Dam and spillways
- Type of dam: Arch
- Impounds: Isère
- Height: 180 m (590 ft)
- Length: 296 m (971 ft)
- Elevation at crest: 1,790 m (5,870 ft)
- Width (crest): 10 m (33 ft)
- Width (base): 43.57 m (142.9 ft)
- Dam volume: 632,000 m^{3} (827,000 cu yd)

Reservoir
- Creates: Lac du Chevril
- Total capacity: 230,000,000 m^{3} (186,464 acre⋅ft)
- Catchment area: 171 km^{2} (66 mi^{2})
- Surface area: 2.74 km^{2} (1 mi^{2})

Power Station
- Operator: Électricité de France
- Hydraulic head: Brevieres: 233 m (764 ft); Malgovert: 750 m (2,461 ft)
- Turbines: Brevieres: 3 x 32 MW Francis-type; Malgovert: 4 x 83 MW Pelton-type
- Installed capacity: Brevieres: 96 MW; Malgovert: 332 MW

The Tignes Dam, also known as the Chevril Dam, is an arch dam on the Isère in the municipality of Tignes in the Rhône-Alpes region in south-eastern France. In planning since the 1920s and under the protest of locals, the dam was constructed between 1948 and 1952 with the purpose of hydroelectric power. At the time of its completion, it was the tallest dam in Europe. Water from the dam's reservoir, Lac du Chevril, feeds two power stations, the 96 MW Brevieres Power Station and the 332 MW Malgovert Power Station, for a total installed capacity of 428 MW. The yearly average combined output of the two power stations is 94 MW. Brevieres is located about 1 km (0.62 mi) downstream of the dam and Malgovert is also located downstream, 17 km (11 mi) to the northwest at 45°37′04.28″N 6°47′25.31″E. The dam was designed by Coyne & Bellier and is currently owned and operated by Électricité de France. Lac du Chevril flooded the town of Tignes which was relocated nearby.

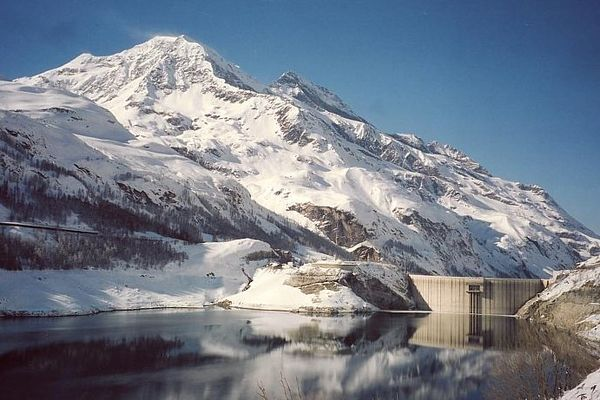
View of the dam taken from the Lac Du Chevril side

In 1989, in preparation for the 1992 Winter Olympics, Jean-Marie Pierret painted a fresco of the Olympian figure Hercules on the dam's face. The feat, by Pierret and eight other painters, took 60 days.

The dam plays an important part in the French supernatural drama television series The Returned.

== See also ==
- Renewable energy in France
