= La Coche Power Station =

Dam in Aigueblanche, Savoie, France

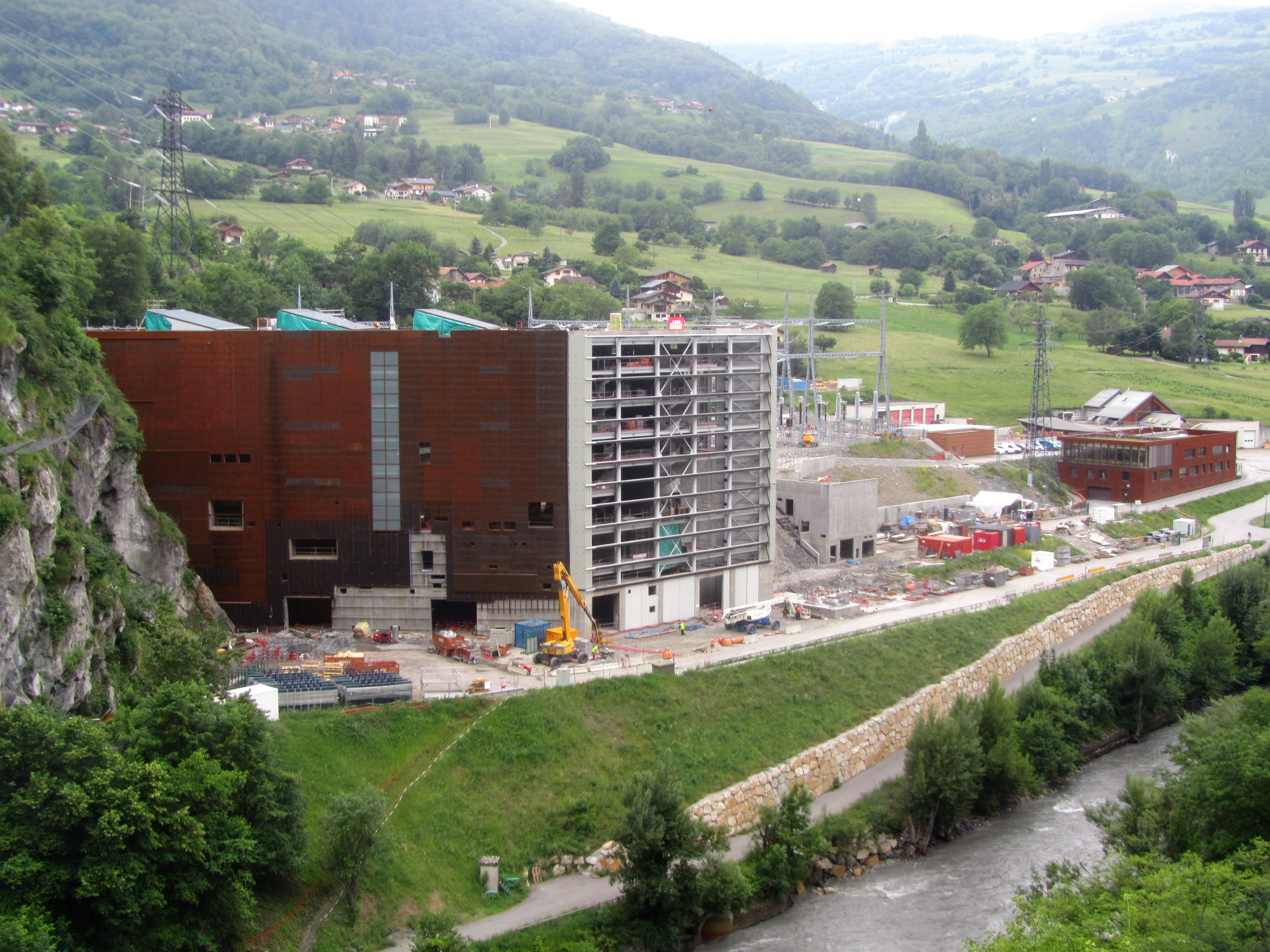
- Interactive map of La Coche Power Station
- Official name: Centrale de La Coche
- Country: France
- Location: Aigueblanche, Savoie
- Coordinates: 45°29′47″N 6°30′47″E
- Status: Operational
- Opening date: 1975
- Operator: EDF

Upper reservoir
- Creates: La Coche Reservoir
- Total capacity: 2,100,000 m^{3} (1,700 acre⋅ft)

Lower reservoir
- Creates: Aigueblanche Reservoir
- Total capacity: 500,000 m^{3} (410 acre⋅ft)

Power Station
- Hydraulic head: 927 m (3,041 ft)
- Pump-generators: 4 reversible 5-stage Francis pump-turbines
- Installed capacity: 320 MW

La Coche Power Station (French: Centrale de la Coche), also known as Sainte-Hélène la Coche, is a hydroelectric power plant in the commune of Aigueblanche (near Moûtiers), in Savoie, France. It is one of the six main pumped-storage hydropower plants in France.

== Design ==
This subterranean power station uses both pumped-storage and the gravity of natural stream flow to generate electricity through four reversible Francis turbine generator assemblies. The water is first taken from La Coche Reservoir (Cuvette de la Coche), then passes through the power station, and finally drains into the Aigueblanche Dam on the Isère River. The four turbines then permit the water to be pumped from the Aigueblanche Dam (also known as the Echelles d'Annibal Dam) back up to the reservoir at a 1,400-meter (4,600-foot) elevation.

La Coche Power Station was originally a prototype for the Grand'Maison Dam, which also functions as a pumped-storage system. La Coche's installed power capacity is 320 megawatts. Its hydraulic head of 927 m (3,041 ft) gives a flow rate of 40 cubic meters per second (1,400 cubic feet per second).

== Water sources ==
La Coche Reservoir, which lies at an elevation of 1,401 m (4,596 ft), is supplied by several watercourses and feeds in its turn a 3-kilometer-long (1.9 mi) penstock. The water then descends 500 m (1,600 ft) through this conduit to the power station's turbines.

There are eight water intake points that feed the reservoir, located on the following rivers: Bridan and Nant-Pérou, Eau Rousse, Morel, Nant Brun and Encombres, Belleville, and Allues.

== See also ==
- Renewable energy in France
