= Broquiès =

Commune in Occitanie, France

- Commune
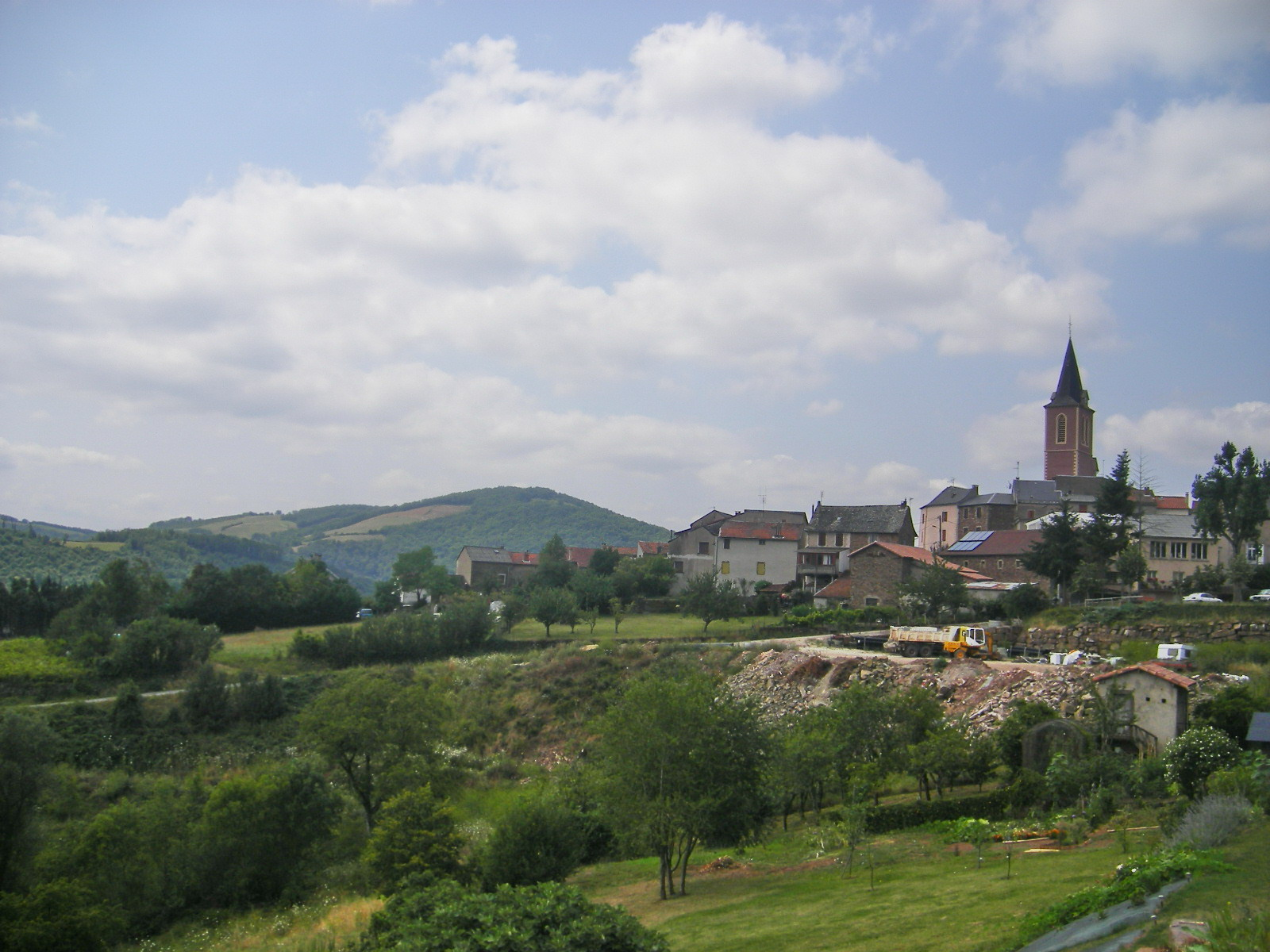
- A general view of Broquiès

- Coat of arms
- Location of Broquiès
- Location within France Location within Occitanie
- Coordinates: 44°00′21″N 2°41′47″E
- Country: France
- Region: Occitania
- Department: Aveyron
- Arrondissement: Millau
- Canton: Raspes et Lévezou

Government
  - Mayor (2020–2026): Jean-Luc Crassous
- Area^{1}: 37.99 km^{2} (14.67 sq mi)
- Elevation: 367 m (1,204 ft)
- Highest elevation: 738 m (2,421 ft)
- Lowest elevation: 243 m (797 ft)
- Population (2023): 613
  - Density: 16.1/km^{2} (41.8/sq mi)
- Time zone: UTC+01:00 (CET)
  - Summer (DST): UTC+02:00 (CEST)
- INSEE/Postal code: 12037 /12480
- ^{1} French Land Register data, which excludes lakes, ponds, glaciers > 1 km^{2} (0.386 sq mi or 247 acres) and river estuaries.

Broquiès (French pronunciation: [bʁɔkjɛs]; Occitan: Broquièrs) is a commune in the Aveyron department in southern France.

== Geography ==
The commune is in the Raspes de Tarn; on both banks of the river Tarn. The village is on the north bank where the land rises steeply from the Tarn (243 metres (797 ft)) to the Lévézou plateau (600 metres (2,000 ft)). On each side of the village are streams that have cut deep valley. An strategically important road from Saint-Izaire and Saint-Affrique crosses the Tarn at le Navech, and uses the valley to the east to zig-zag upwards through Vieux Broquies to the promontory(350 metres (1,150 ft)- 400 metres (1,300 ft)) where the main village is located. Here the road heads along the valley side to Rodez, Le Truel and Villefranche-de-Panat. On the south bank the Dourdou de Camarès flows into the Tarn.

=== Pont de Navech ===
The crossing point at le Navech was served from medieval times by a ferry. The first bridge was built in 1865. In 1875 it washed away by 'une grande crue' and was rebuilt. Again in 1982 the centre arches were breached by the 'crues' and the bridge rebuilt.

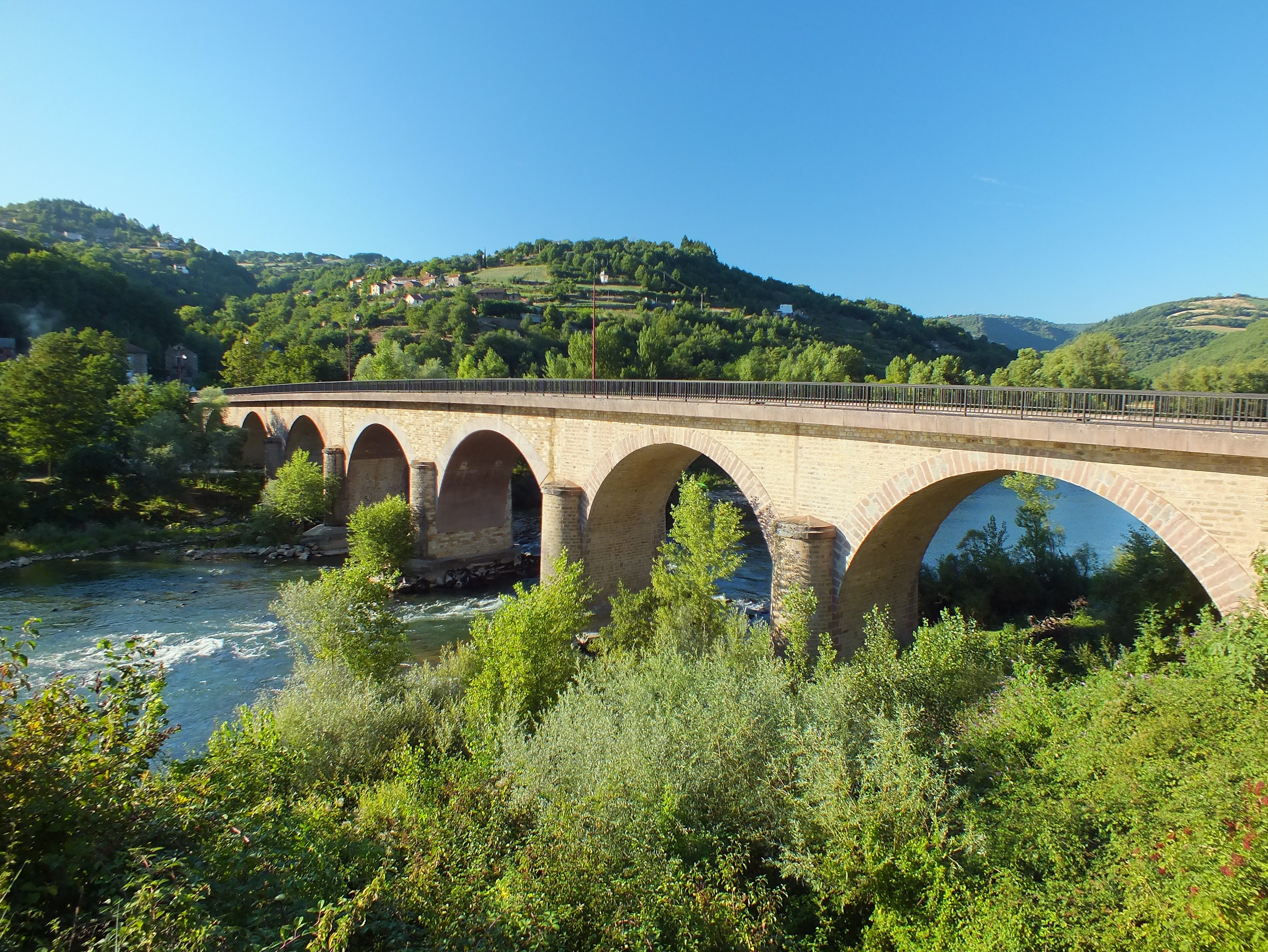
The Pont de Navech approached from Saint-Izaire

=== La Jourdanie ===
The La Jourdanie (power station) is on the River Tarn upstream of the Pont de Navech. Two Kaplan turbines and two helical turbines generate 18MW. The dam is 145m long and 17m high.

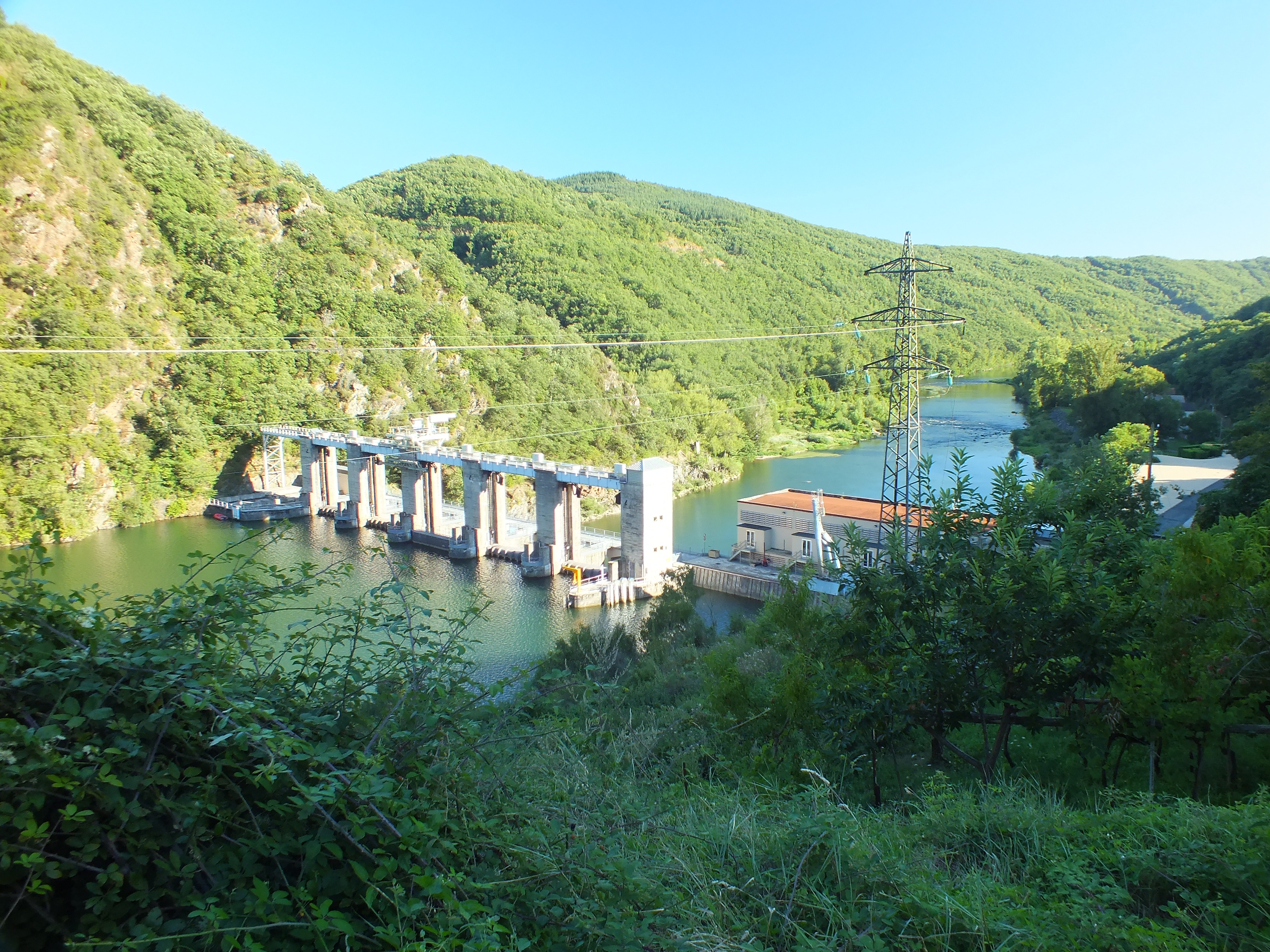
La Jourdanie power station

== History ==
There was an artistic neolithic population in the area (3000BC). The Menhir de la Coste, now on display in the Fenaille Museum in Rodez occurred to the north of the commune adjacent to the ancient road (D25). It has been replaced by a replica. By 1000BC the area was occupied by Iron Age Celts called the 'broccos'. The Carolingians wrote of an incident at Broquiès fixing the date of the foundation of the village to around 800 AD.

=== The seigneurs of Broquiès ===
Frotard, count of Ayssenès was seigneur of Broquiès around 1100, a scion of families of the Counts of Toulouse and of the Vicomtes d'Albi et Nîmes. He commenced building the castle and fortifications. In 1275 the seigneurship passed to the powerful Combret family who held it till it passed in marriage to the Arpajons in 1597. There was a ferry service across the Tarn by 1339. Further fortifications were built in 1365, but the town was ravaged by Routier, marauding soldiers in 1375. Around 1550 the seigneur embraced Protestantism. A temple wes built, and during the Wars of Religion which continued till 27-06-1628, the Catholics under Duc De Joyeuse took the Temple on 8-11-1586- it was recaptured by the Protestants in 1588. The Protestant Arpajons held the title for two generations whence it passed by marriage in 1656 to Jacques De Loubens-Verdalle who son died childless in 1711. It then passed to Claude Buisson whose second wife was the last seigneuresse de Broquiès. During this time the current church was built, and a temporary bridge built over the Tarn.

=== Modern times ===
In 1790 the Rouergue became the department of Aveyron, and Broquiès became part of the district of Saint-Affrique, though this changed in 1801 when it was attached to Saint-Rome-de-Tarn. The castle was pillaged and destroyed in 1792. A college was founded in 1853 by the Frères du Sacré-Cœur it became state run in 1905 and closed in 1960. It was demolished and is now the site of the Gendarmerie. Electricity generation started here around 1900, La Jourdanie commenced in 1932. The vineyards were badly affected by phylloxera and the hard winter of 1956.

== Population ==
The population peaked around 1886 with 2067 inhabitants. Through rural de-population it was down to 1316 in 1945.

Historical population
Year	Pop.	±% p.a.
1968	1,022	—
1975	881	−2.10%
1982	752	−2.24%
1990	652	−1.77%
1999	678	+0.44%
2007	648	−0.56%
2012	621	−0.85%
2017	612	−0.29%
2023	613	+0.03%
Source: INSEE

== Agriculture ==
In the past the soil has been exploited by the peasant farmers for all types of crop, today it is principally used as pasture for milking sheep for the cheese producers in Roquefort and for vineyards for Cotes de Tarn red wine.

== Buildings and Monuments ==
=== Menhir ===
Menhir de la Coste

=== Church ===
The church was constructed in the Flamboyant Gothic style between 1629 and 1637. The mason was Joan Fabier. It is notable for its ogive vaulting and the rose window on the west facade. The floor and paintings were restored in 1997.

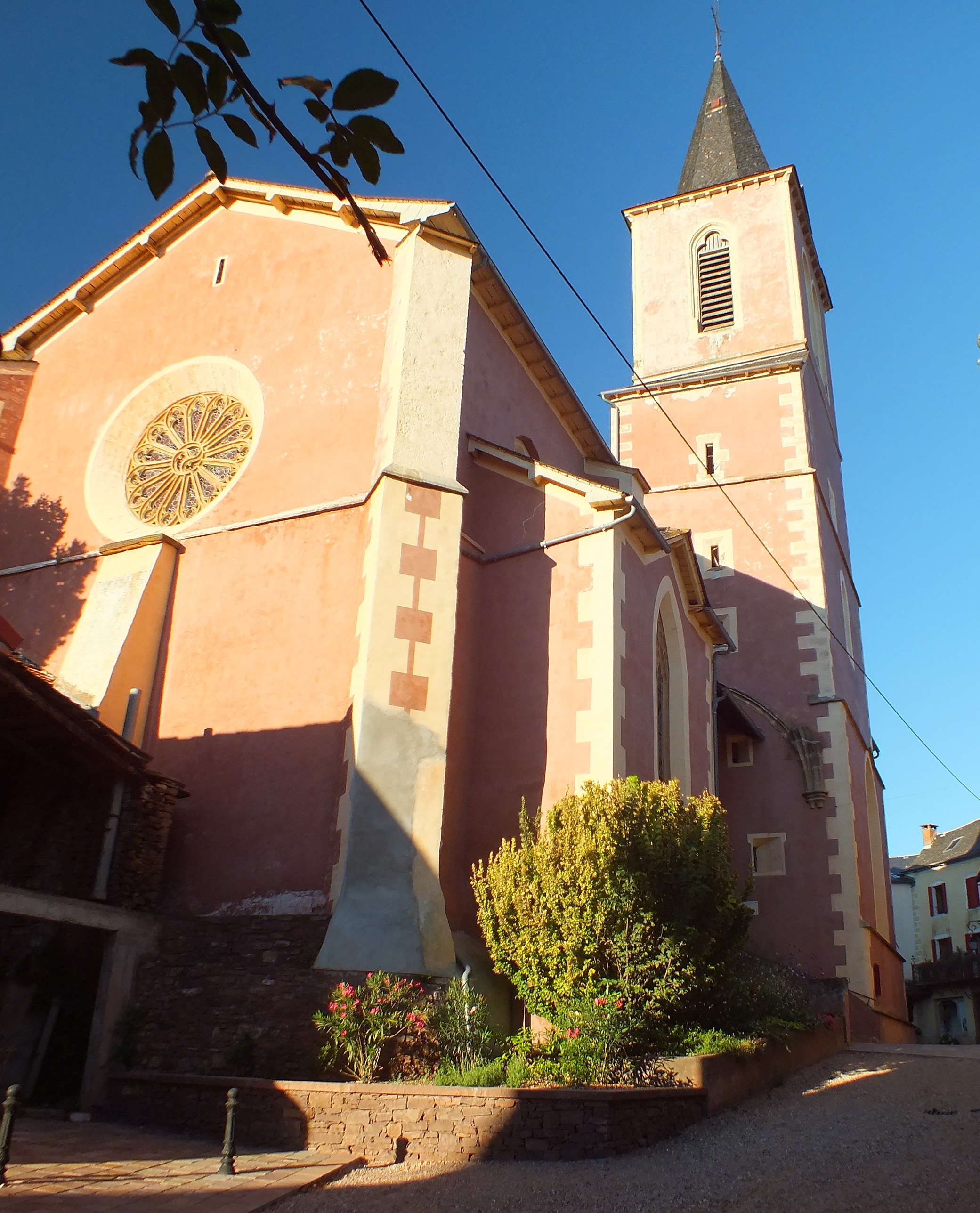

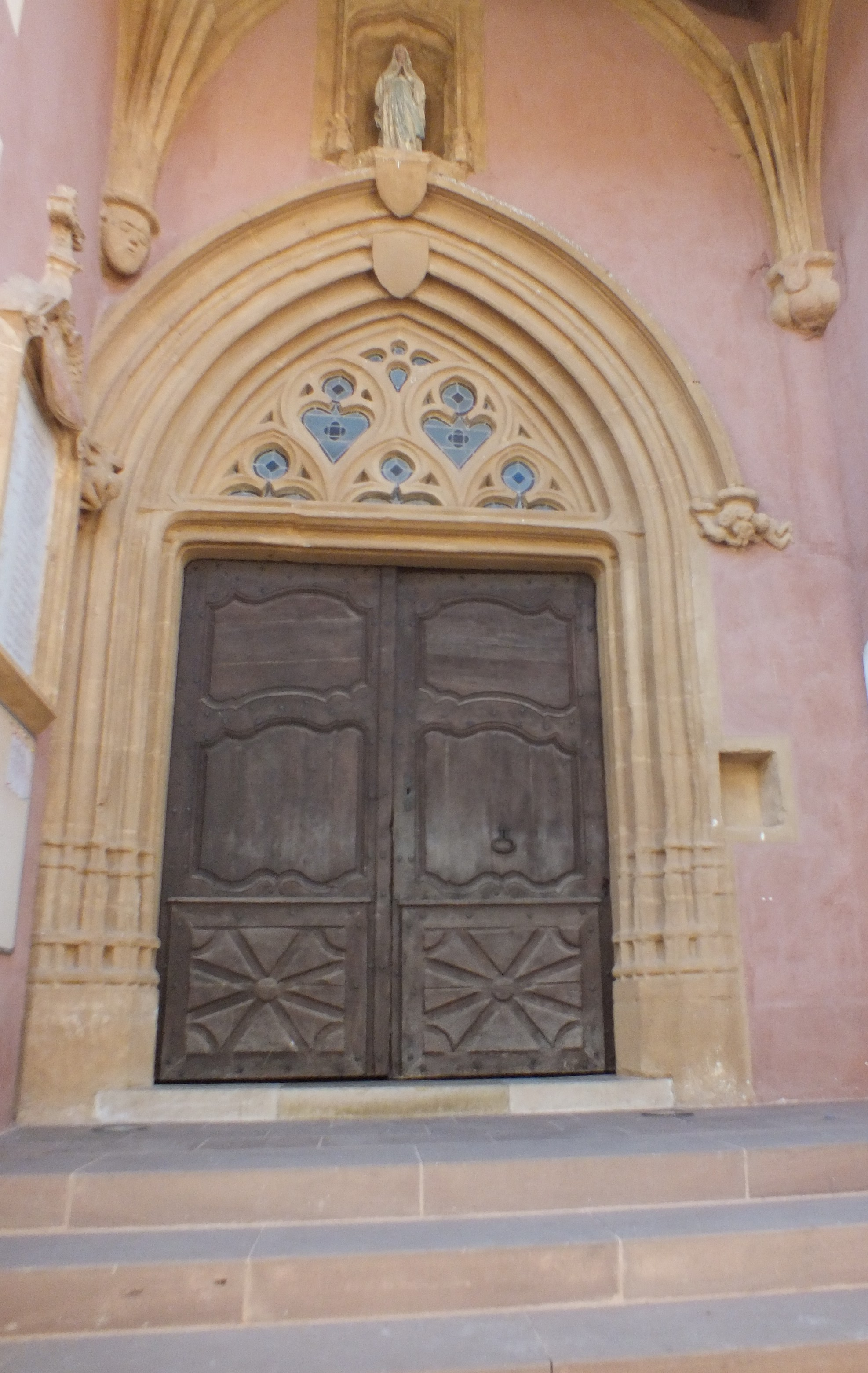

== See also ==
- Communes of the Aveyron department
