= Coyne et Bellier =

France-based consulting and engineering firm

- Industry: Engineering
- Founded: 1947
- Founder: André Coyne
- Headquarters: Gennevilliers, France
- Number of locations: 43
- Products: Engineering and project management, management consulting
- Owner: Engie
- Parent: Tractebel

Coyne et Bellier is a global consulting and engineering firm based in Gennevilliers, France. They specialize in infrastructure projects such as dams, nuclear and hydroelectric power plants, roads, tunnels and other below-surface facilities. The company also carries out environmental and social impact assessment. They operate out of 43 offices in Asia, Europe, the Americas, and Africa. The company was created by André Coyne and is a subsidiary of Tractebel, now part of Engie.

== History ==
The company was established by André Coyne in 1947 as Engineering Consultancy André Coyne et Jean Bellier (ACJB). Of the many projects the company designed, the Tignes Dam in France which was completed in 1952 which was followed by the Bin el Ouidane Dam in Morocco in 1953. In 1959, the Kariba Dam along the Zambia/Zimbabwe border was completed and the Malpasset Dam in France, which was completed in 1954, had a tragic failure. In the same year work was completed on two reactors at the Marcoule Nuclear Site in France along with the Yaté Dam in New Caledonia.

In 1960, the Serre-Ponçon Dam was completed and André Coyne died. Two years later ACJB became Coyne et Bellier. They continued to design dams that were completed to include their 100th dam, Jatiluhur Dam in Indonesia, Daniel-Johnson Dam in Canada (1968) and Tour Aurore office building in France (1970).

In 1976, Electrobel became the primary shareholder of the company. They completed El Saada Dam, their 150th, in Algeria in 1978. Electrobel merged with Tractionnel in 1987 to form Tractebel. Tricastin Nuclear Power Plant in France was completed in 1980 and the Grande Arche, also in France in 1989. When the Aoulouz Dam in Morocco was completed in 1990, it marked their 200th dam designed. Birecik Dam in Turkey was completed in 2000 and the Machadinho and Cana Brava Dams in Brazil were completed.

Coyne et Bellier was renamed Tractebel Engineering SA in 2009 but still operates under their original name and serves their parent's hydraulic sector.
