= Bimont Dam =

Dam in France

Coordinates: 43.5405°N 5.5365°E

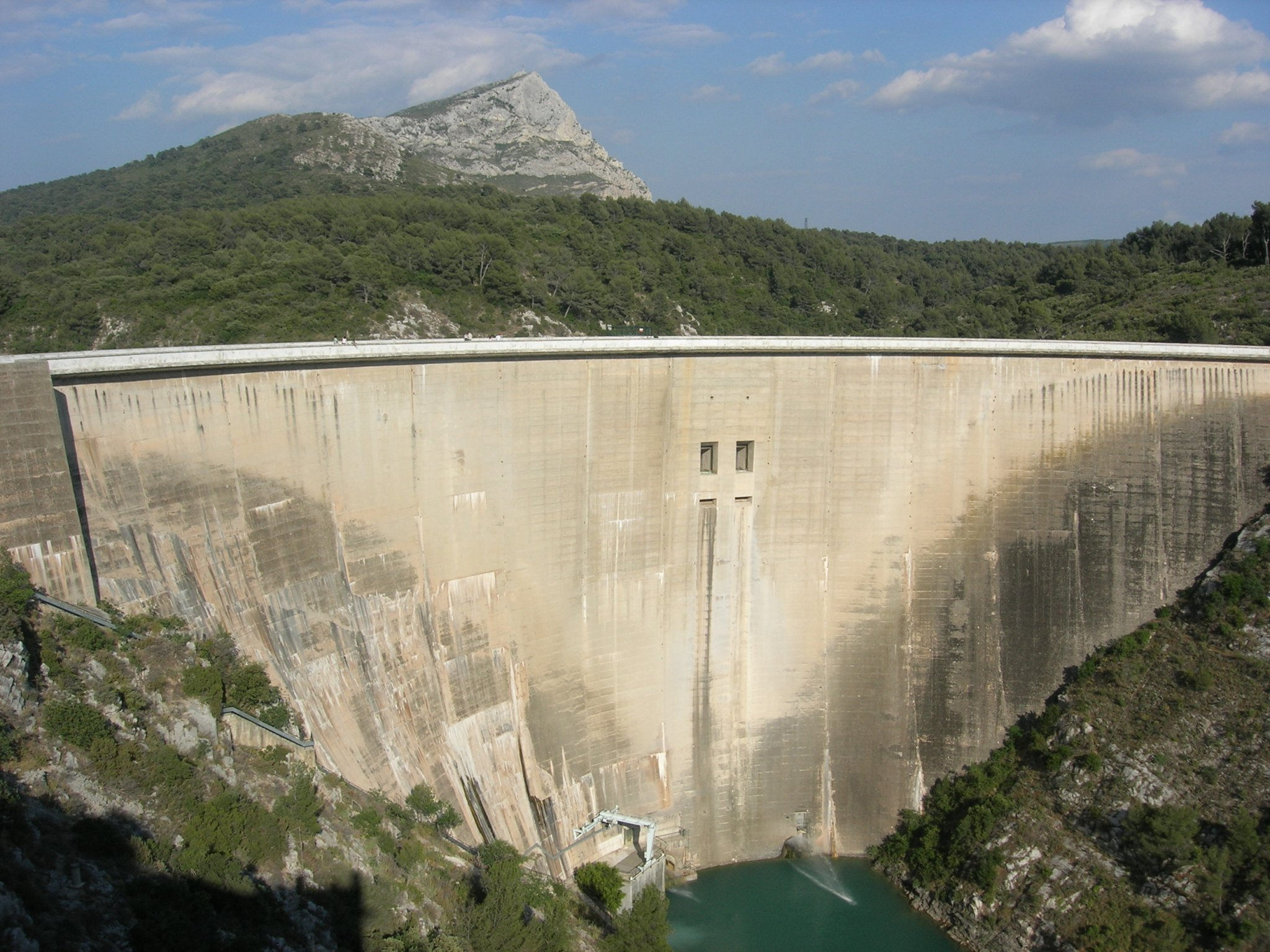
The Bimont Dam.

The Bimont Dam is a dam in Saint-Marc-Jaumegarde near Aix-en-Provence in France. It was completed in 1951.

== See also ==
- Renewable energy in France
