= Revin Pumped Storage Power Plant =

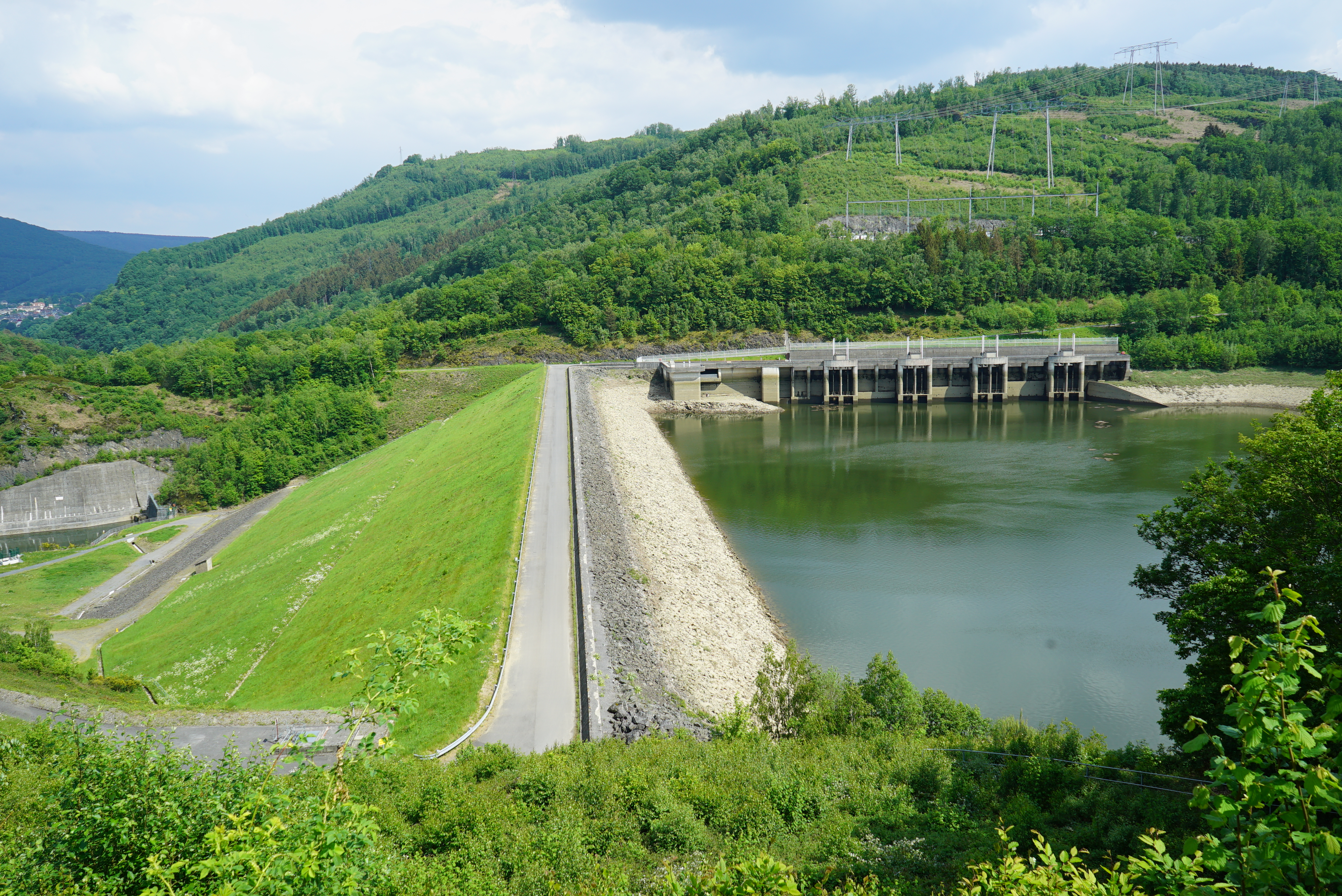
- Country: France
- Location: Revin, Département Ardennes
- Coordinates: 49°55′32″N 4°36′48″E
- Status: Operational
- Opening date: 1976
- Owner: Électricité de France (EDF)

Upper reservoir
- Creates: Bassin supérieur des Marquisades
- Total capacity: 8.5 mn m³

Lower reservoir
- Creates: Bassin inférieur de Whitaker
- Total capacity: 9 mn m³

Power Station
- Hydraulic head: 250
- Pump-generators: 4
- Installed capacity: 800 MW
- Annual generation: 1,000 GWh

The Revin Pumped Storage Power Plant is located in Grand-Est France, near Revin in the department of Ardennes and the Belgian border. The pumped storage power plant, commissioned in 1976, is owned by Électricité de France (EDF) and has a nameplate capacity of 800 megawatts (MW). Measured by capacity, it is the third largest pumped storage power plant in France.

== Characteristics ==
Revin Pumped Storage Power Plant was constructed as an underground power station: Four Francis turbines which are used for both generating and pumping with a capacity of 200 MW each are located in a 115 m long, 17 m wide and 16 m high cavern. Four transformers are installed on the surface to connect the generators (13 kV) to the electrical grid (400 kV).

There are three reservoirs which are connected to the Revin Pumped Storage Power Plant.

Dams and reservoirs of the Revin Pumped Storage Power Plant
| Name | Function | Dam | | Capacity |
| Name | Function | Length | Height | Capacity |
| Name | Function | in metres | in metres | in mn. cubic metres |
|---|---|---|---|---|
| Bassin supérieur des Marquisades | Upper reservoir | 4200 | 9–18 | 8.5 |
| Bassin inférieur de Whitaker | Lower reservoir | 300 | 35 | 9 |
| Lac des Vieilles Forges | Equalizing basin | 250 | 10 | 5 |

The upper and lower reservoirs are separated by a vertical distance of 250 m.

== See also ==
- Renewable energy in France
