= Marèges Dam =

Dam on the Upper Dordogne river in Liginiac (France)

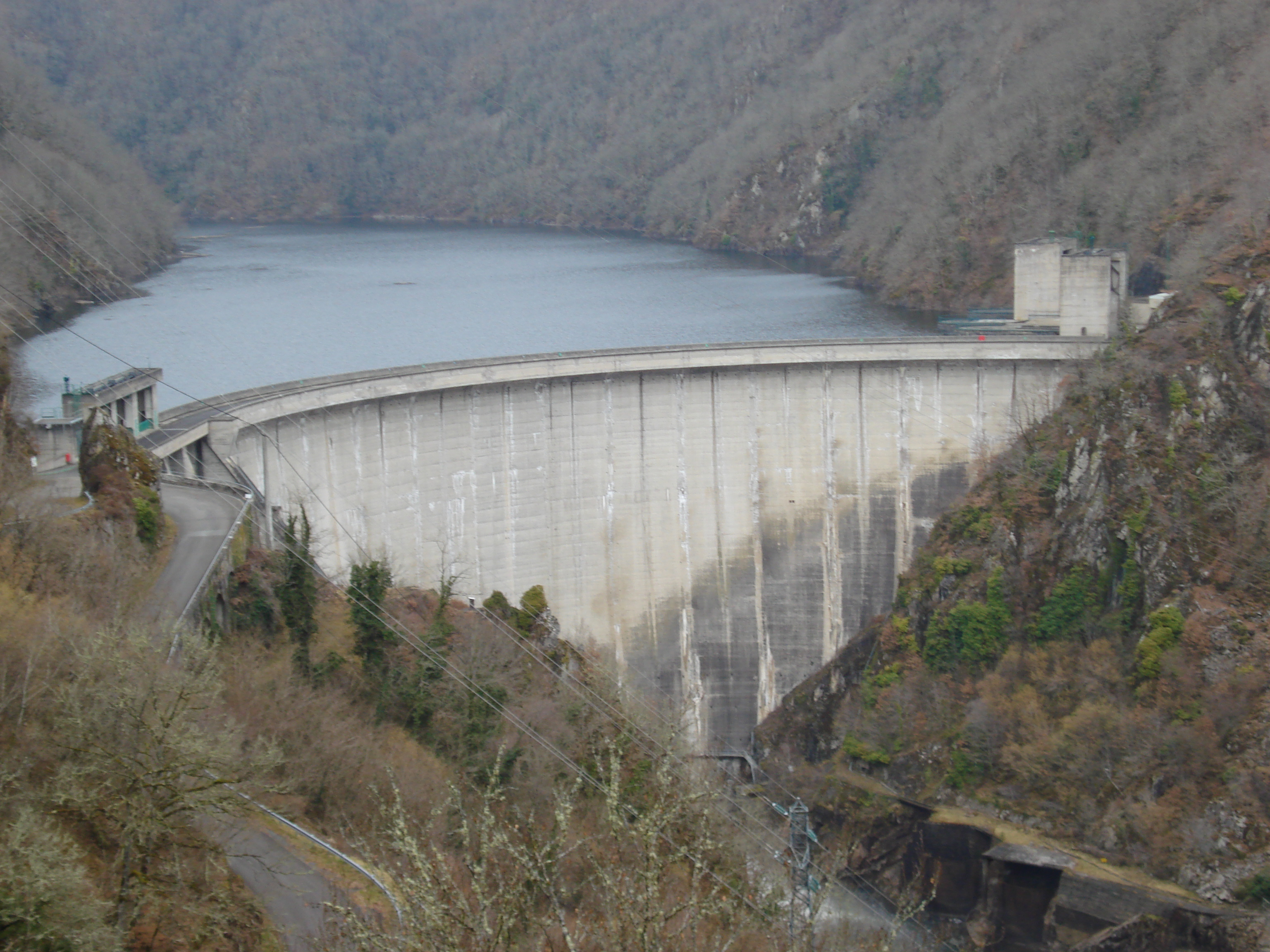

- Location within France
- Official name: Barrage de Marèges
- Country: France
- Location: Liginiac
- Coordinates: 45°23′30″N 2°21′51″E
- Status: Operational
- Construction began: 1932
- Opening date: 1935
- Owner: Société Hydroélectrique du Midi (SHEM)

Dam and spillways
- Type of dam: Concrete arch, double-curvature
- Height: 89.5 m (294 ft)
- Length: 198 m (650 ft)
- Elevation at crest: 408 m (1,339 ft)
- Width (crest): 3 m (10 ft)
- Width (base): 19 m (62 ft)
- Dam volume: 185,000 m^{3} (241,971 cu yd)

Reservoir
- Total capacity: 47,000,000 m^{3} (38,104 acre⋅ft)
- Catchment area: 2,540 km^{2} (981 mi^{2})
- Surface area: 1.2 km^{2} (297 acres)

Power Station
- Commission date: 1935/1988
- Turbines: 4 x 37.5 MW Francis-type, 1 x 122 MW Francis-type
- Installed capacity: 272 MW
- Annual generation: 338 GWh

The Marèges Dam is a concrete arch dam on the Dordogne River. It is located 4 km (2 mi) southeast of Liginiac in Corrèze department, France. It was constructed between 1932 and 1935 by the Railway Company du Midi. Its primary purpose is the generation of hydroelectricity and the original power station contained four Francis turbine-generators.

The dam and its power plant was built to help France become less dependent on costly energy resource imports after World War I. The fifth Francis turbine-generator, rated at 122 MW, at the Saint Pierre power station, on the left bank of the river, was commissioned in 1988.

The dam, designed by André Coyne, incorporated several innovative features to include a ski-jump spillway, the right abutment anchored with a prestressed cables and monitored with vibrating wire sensors (emitting an audible signals like a guitar), and a new cofferdam design.

== See also ==
- Renewable energy in France
