= André Coyne =

French civil engineer specialized in dam design and construction

André Coyne (10 February 1891 – 21 July 1960) was a French civil engineer who founded the consulting firm Coyne et Bellier and was President of the International Commission on Large Dams from 1945 to 1953. He designed 70 dams in 14 countries during his lifetime.

== Biography ==
Coyne was born in Paris on 11 February 1891. He received his education at École Polytechnique and its School of Civil Engineering afterwards.

He worked on the Plougastel Bridge and in 1928 was appointed as the chief engineer of dams in the Upper Dordogne River. While in that position, he designed the Marèges Dam which incorporated several innovative advancements in dam design (a.o., a spillway of the ski jumping ramp type). In 1935 he became the head of France's Large Dam Engineering Department and between 1945 and 1953 he served as President of the International Commission on Large Dams. In 1947 he departed civil service and started his own consulting firm, Coyne et Bellier.

Other dams he later designed in France include the Grandval and Roselend Dams. Abroad he designed the Kariba Dam on the Zimbabwe-Zambia border, the Daniel-Johnson Dam in Quebec and the Santa Luzia Dam in Portugal.

Coyne also designed the Malpasset Dam in Southern France. Nearly immediately after construction was completed on the dam, cracks were noticed at the base. A few years later, on 2 December 1959, the dam abruptly broke and collapsed, releasing a 50-meter-high (160 ft) wall of water that reached the nearby town of Fréjus, killing 423 people. It was said that Coyne was deeply affected by the dam's failure, and immediately blamed himself, claiming he was solely responsible. Indeed, Coyne did not implement the advice of Georges Corroy, a geologist, to build the dam 650 ft upstream, nor did he adapt the spillway gate to the flood flow. He died half a year later.

A study later found that factors for the dams failure included the location of the dam, the stability of the rock material, the fact that a geological fault was found on the site, and heavy rain that had raised the water level by 15 feet that year. Also, intense mining for a new highway nearby downstream is suspected to have weakened the dam site.

Coyne died in Neuilly-sur-Seine on 21 July 1960.
