= Tour Aurore =

Office skyscraper

Coordinates: 48°53′24″N 2°14′50.5″E

- Tour Aurore in 2024

General information
- Location: La Défense, France
- Inaugurated: 1970
- Height: 133 meters

Technical details
- Floor count: 27

Design and construction
- Architecture firm: Coyne et Bellier

Tour Aurore is a 133-metre, 27-story office building in the La Défense central business district outside of Paris. Empty since the 1990s, its destruction was announced a decade later, but its new owner since 2018 decided to keep and upgrade the building.

== History ==
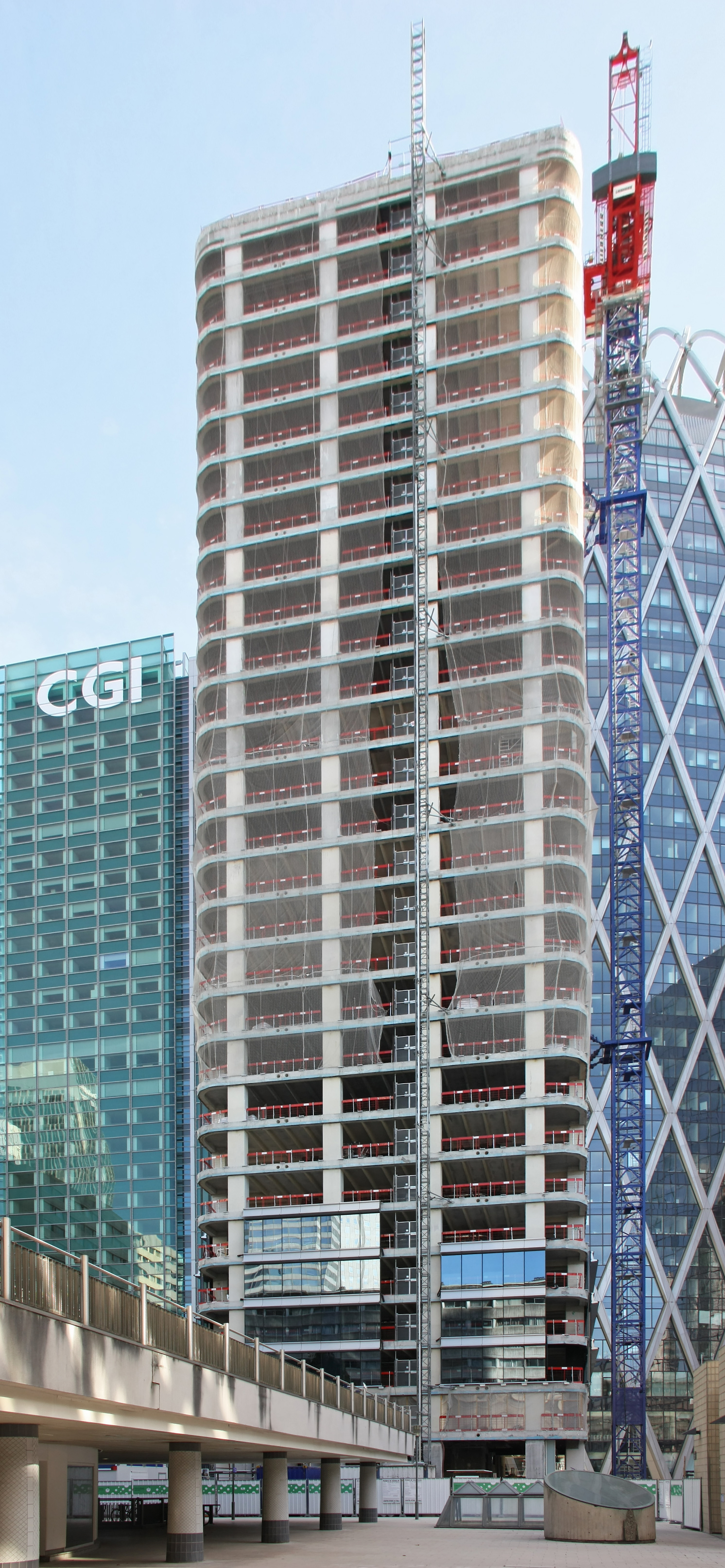
Tour Aurore being renovated in 2020

Tour Aurore was designed by Coyne et Bellier and constructed in 1970.

Since the 1990s, no tenants occupied the building. It became the property of The Carlyle Group who obtained in 2011 the permit to demolish Tour Aurore to erect a new building, Tour Air 2.

In March 2018, the investment firm Aermont bought the real estate development project from The Carlyle Group. A week later, it was announcement that the destruction project was abandoned after The Carlyle Group failed to get the necessary approvals to launch it. A project to restructure it and add top floors was announced. Its iconic copper windows would be replaced with a more contemporary look.
