= Wind power in France =

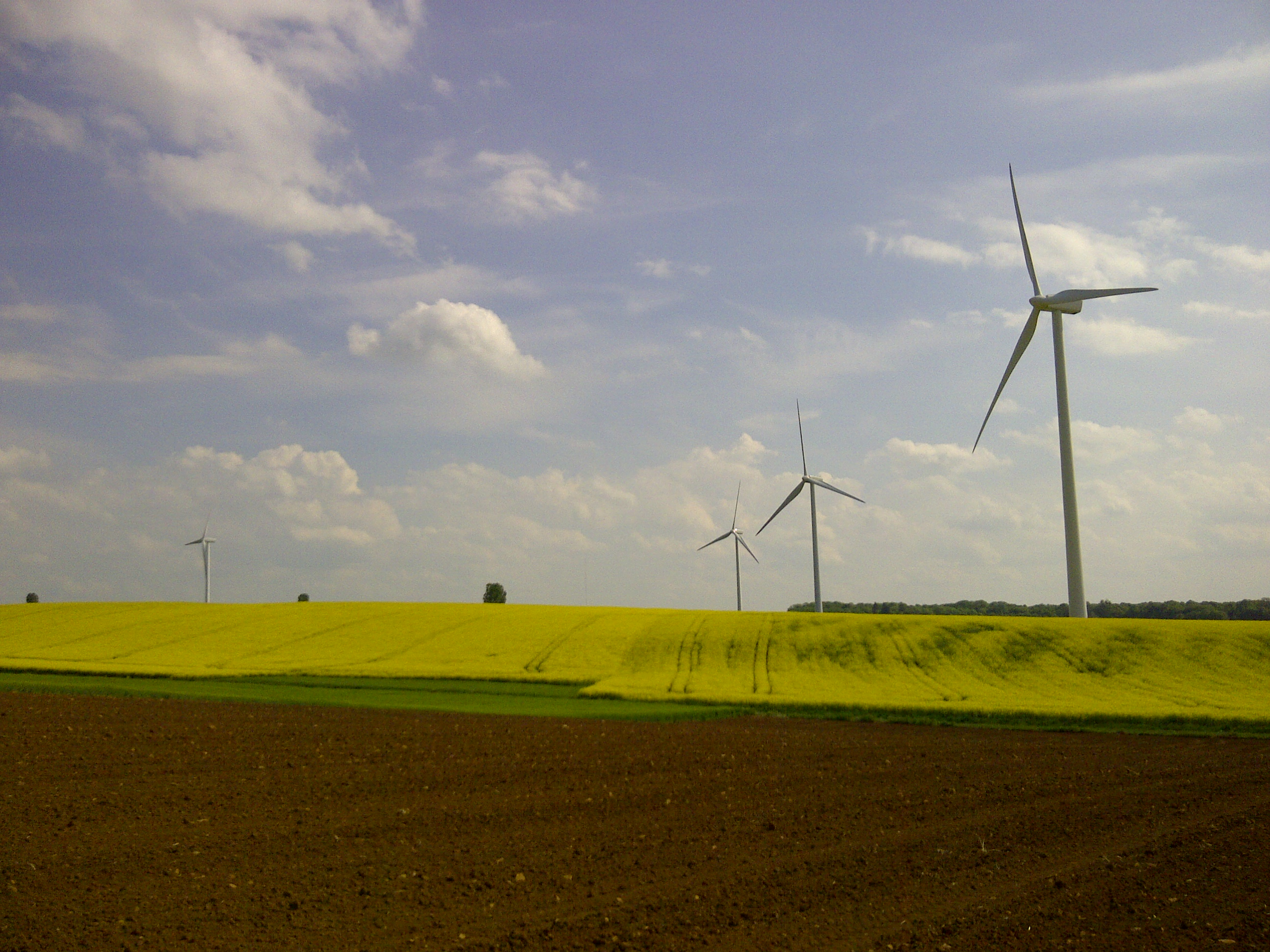
Wind turbines in Champagne-Ardenne.

In 2021, France reached a total of 18,676 megawatts (MW) installed wind power capacity placing France at that time as the world's seventh largest wind power nation by installed capacity, behind the United Kingdom and Brazil and ahead of Canada and Italy. According to the IEA the yearly wind production was 20.2 TWh in 2015, representing almost 23% of the 88.4 TWh from renewable sources in France during that year. Wind provided 4.3% of the country's electricity demand in 2015.

Wind energy capacity, 2014-2023 (MW)
2014	2015	2016	2017	2018	2019	2020	2021	2022	2023
9,201	10,298	11,567	13,499	14,900	16,427	17,535	18,551	20,811	22,196

Onshore wind energy capacity, 2014-2023 (MW)
2014	2015	2016	2017	2018	2019	2020	2021	2022	2023
9,191	10,287	11,556	13,497	14,898	16,425	17,533	18,549	20,809	22,194

France has the second largest wind potential in Europe. The country's wind power potential is due to its large land area and extensive agricultural landscape where turbines may be located more readily as well as access to considerable offshore resources.

== Timeline of developments ==
- In 2001 the French government initially planned to produce 21% of its electricity consumption with renewable energy in 2010 to comply with European directive 2001/77/CE of 27 September 2001. This means that France had to produce 106 TWh of renewable energy in 2010, up from 71 TWh in 2006. Wind power represents 75% of the 35 TWh additional production in 2010.
- In 2016 installed capacity rose above 1 GW for the first time during the year.
- By year-end 2015 the total onshore installed capacity of 10,358 MW consisted of 5,956 turbines, with the average turbine at just under 2 MW of power. The leading regions in France in 2015 were Champagne-Ardenne with an installed capacity of 1,682 MW, Picardie with 1,502 MW, Centre with 872 MW and Bretagne with 836 MW.
- In 2016 while France has been a relative late developer in wind power compared to other European countries it has set the target of more than doubling onshore wind power capacity from 2015 levels by 2023. Offshore wind power is scheduled to come online from 2018 for the first time and including marine energy could rise to up to 11.1 GW of power by 2023. Realisation of these plans would more than likely see France overtake highly ranked Spain in terms of installed capacity by 2023.
- 2018 saw France hold its first onshore wind auction, 500 MW in 22 projects at a strike price of €65.4 MWh.
- In 2019, Emmanuel Macron (President of France since May 2017) confirmed France's pledge to add 1 GW offshore wind every year between 2020 and 2024 as laid out in France's new draft energy plan (PPE).
- In February 2022, Macron announced that France was to build 50 offshore wind farms with a combined capacity of at least 40 GW by 2050.

== Installed capacity ==
Year	Installations (MW)	Ref.
2002	148	
2003	248	
2004	390	
2005	757	
2006	1,711	
2007	2,495	
2008	3,577	
2009	4,713	
2010	5,977	
2011	6,809	
2012	7,613	
2013	8,558	
2014	9,285	

Year	Installations (MW)	Ref.
2015	10,358	
2016	12,066	
2017	13,512	
2018	15,108	
2019	16,260	
2020	17,382	
2021	18,676	
2022	19,524	

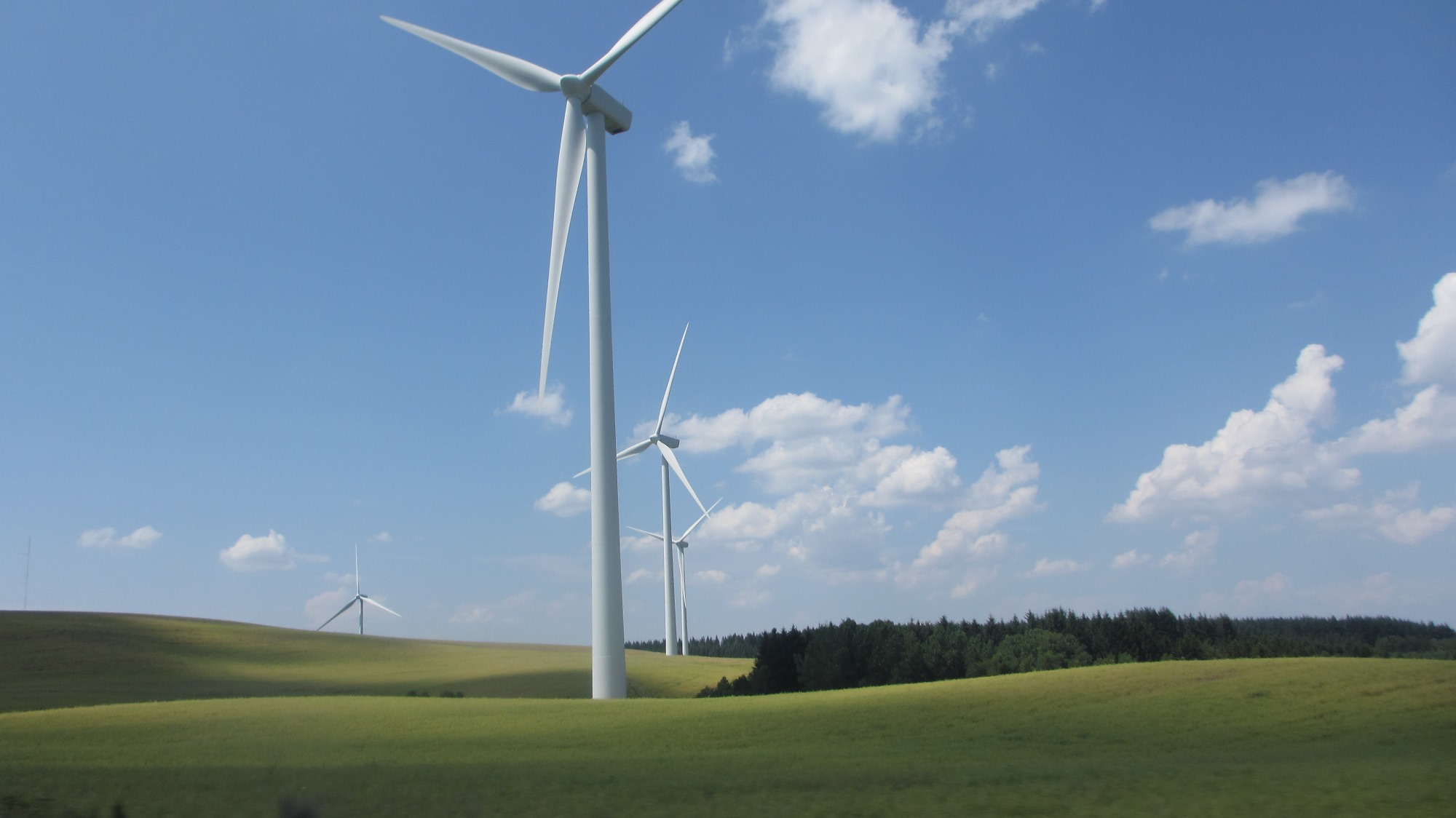
Wind turbines in the Aveyron department of the Midi-Pyrenees region of France

== Future projections ==
=== Onshore ===
Projected onshore windpower in France
	2014	2018	2023 low	2023 high
Onshore wind power	9,300 MW	15,000 MW	21,800 MW	26,000 MW

Onshore wind power is projected to rise to 15,000 MW by 2018 and between a low target scenario of 21,800 MW and a high target scenario of 26,000 MW by 2023.

=== Offshore ===
Between 2004 and 2011, high costs and local fishing communities prevented some projects in the public ocean domain. After 2013, information was improved, and permissioning was moved from local to national regulatory authority.

The first commercial offshore wind power project came on line in 2022 with 480 MW capacity. By 2023 another traditional 3,000 MW of capacity is expected to come online with an additional 500 to 6,000 MW of performance dependent installation planned. Marine energy including floating wind turbines will add an additional 100 MW as well as an additional 200 to 2000 MW of capacity by 2023. Overall including marine energy offshore installed capacity will rise to between 3,100 and 11,100 MW by 2023. French law requires owners to decommission facilities at their end-of-life.

The 2022 plan for 2050 is for 40 GW of offshore wind energy.

== Onshore auctions ==
Auctions started in 2018 and in 2021 France introduced a scheme to combine auctions for all types of renewables, called PPE2.

Onshore wind auctions
No. (PPE2)	Year	MW	Projects	Av. strike price	Ref.
1	2018	500	22	€65.4 MWh	
2	2018	118	5	€65.4 MWh	
3	2019	516	21	€63.0 MWh	
4	2019	576	20	€66.50 MWh	
5	2020	649	88	€62.11 MWh	
6	2020	749	23	€62.90 MWh	
7	2021	519	15	€59.5 MWh	
8 (1)	2021	404	26	€60.8 MWh	
9 (2)	2022	510	32	€59,52 KWh	
10 (3)	2022	293	17	€67,5 MWh	
	Total	4,454	216		

Onshore wind auctions
PPE2	Year	MW	Projects	Av. strike price	Ref.
	2023	54	4	€76.4 MWh	
4	2023	1,156	73	€85.29 MWh	
5	2023	931	54	€86.94 MWh	

== Offshore auctions ==
The following offshore windfarm projects listed have been successful at the auctions.

No.	Wind farm	Coordinates	Cap. (MW)	Turbines	Commissioned	Build cost/ Strike price	Depth range (m)	km to shore	Owner	Refs.
1; 2012	Saint-Nazaire Offshore Wind Farm	47.16°N 2.607°W	480	80 x 6 MW Haliade 150-6MW (GE Energy)	2022	€2 billion @€150MWh	10-21m	12 km	EDF, Enbridge and WPD	
1; 2012	Projet eolien en Mer de la Baie de Saint-Brieuc	48.854°N 2.537°W	496	62 x 8 MW AD8-180 (Adwen)	2024	€2.4 billion @€155MWh	28-36m	16.3 km	Iberdrola, Eole-RES and CDC	
1; 2012	Hautes Falaises (Fécamp)	49.892°N 0.227°E	498	83 x 6 MW Haliade 150-6MW (GE Energy)	2024	€2 billion @€150MWh	25-31m	13 km	EDF, Enbridge and WPD	
1; 2012	Calvados	49.470°N 0.522°W	448	75 x 6 MW Haliade 150-6MW (GE Energy)	2024 planned	€1.8 billion @€150MWh	21-30m	11 km	EDF, Enbridge and WPD	
2; 2014	Dieppe Le Tréport	50°09′N 1°07′E	496	62 x 8 MW Siemens Gamesa SG 8.0-167 DD	2025 planned	€2.7 billion @€150MWh	14-24m	15.5 km	Engie, EDPR, Sumitomo Corp and CDC	
2; 2014	Îles d'Yeu et de Noirmoutier	46°52′09″N 2°30′37″W	496	62 x 8 MW Siemens Gamesa SG 8.0-167 DD	2025 planned	€2.5 billion @€137MWh	19-36m	11.7 km	Engie, EDPR, Sumitomo Corp and CDC	
3; 2019	Dunkerque		600	46 x	2028 planned	€1.6 billion @€44MWh		11.4 km	Eoliennes en mer de Dunkerque (EDF, Innogy and Enbridge)	
4; 2023	Centre Manche 1		1,050	47 x	2031 planned	€2 billion @€44.9MWh		>32 km	EDF & Maple Power	
"Cap." is the rated nameplate capacity of the wind farm; "When" is the year when the windfarm was commissioned and put into service.; "Cost" is the total capital cost of the project up to commissioning.; "km to shore" is the average distance of the windfarm to shore, or (where available) the distance from the in-farm transformer/substation to the shore; "Depth range (m)" is the range of minimum to maximum depths of water that the windfarm is sited in; "Refs" cite the source references for the information. The [w ...] footnotes link to each windfarm's own home page

Offshore wind farm locations (interactive map)

=== Floating turbine test sites ===
France is operating a number of offshore test sites for prototype floating wind turbines which would allow turbines to be located in deeper waters. These include the Nenaphur test site, the Nenuphar twin float, the Floatgen Project and the Sem-Rev Site d'Experimentation en Mer which also tests wave energy converters.

On 30 April 2021, the French government launched a call for tenders for the first floating wind farm project in France. The wind farm is to be situated in southern Brittany and will generate between 230 and 270 MW when operating at capacity.

== Public opinion ==
=== Opinion surveys ===
Public opinion of wind power developments has remained quite popular among the French public. A 2021 Harris Interactive survey shows that 76% of the French public have a positive view of wind power. This survey also shows that 77% of the French public living within five kilometers of a wind farm have a positive view of wind power. This is backed up by a 2021 IFOP survey, which shows that 77% of the public has a positive view.

=== Reasons for support ===
==== Collective importance for an Energy Transition ====
91% of the French public believes that the energy transition is a very high stake for French society today. French President Emmanuel Macron announced France 2030, a plan which budgets €2.3 billion in renewable energy development until 2030. This pairs with the fact that 82% of French people believe that wind energy is an energy source for the future. The strong belief in wind energy being a viable source of energy in the future and the strong political salience of the energy transition, together, explain why many in the French public support the installation of wind energy.

==== Positive impact on the economy ====
A Harris Interactive survey showed that 77% of French people believe that wind turbines are a considerable source of revenue for the regions in which they are in place. Jobs in the wind energy sector are also projected to increase. In 2019, France's onshore wind sector was composed of around 900 companies, employing just over 20000 people. In 2021, this number is now over 25000 people. If Macron's France 2030 stays on track with its vision, jobs in the renewable energy industry, including wind, are projected to continue increasing until 2030. This fits public opinion, as 68% of French people believe that wind development will create jobs.

The economic benefits of expanding offshore wind capacity are highlighted by a €4.5 billion investment in three offshore substations. This significant contract, signed in 2024, supports essential infrastructure offshore and stimulates local economies, potentially boosting job creation and regional development.

=== Reason for opposition ===
==== Negative impact on living conditions ====
There have been many examples of resistance to wind power developments due to the negative living environment. Reasons may include increased noise, negative impact on the landscape, and tourist and heritage degradation. For example, in 2012, the construction of three offshore wind turbines had to be abandoned, due to a fear of patrimonial degradation of the Mont St. Michel. After fierce local protests, UNESCO threatened to demote the monument from its World Heritage status, prompting organizers to abandon these wind farms.

In 2023, a protest organized by "Vent Debout" in Dunkerque aimed to stop the ongoing development of offshore wind turbines 10 kilometers from the coast. The main reason for the opposition was the visual degradation of the coastline. A local inhabitant explained that wind turbines would remove the future generations' chance of experiencing the beautiful coast the way they were able to.

==== Impact on environment ====
There is significant worry about offshore wind projects harming the environment and other animals. According to an IFOP poll, 68% of the French public believes that offshore wind turbines are dangerous for birds, marine environments, and fishing. In 2021, a group of 400 fishermen protested against offshore wind turbines in the Le Havre region. The group claimed that since offshore wind turbines started to be developed 15 years ago, the number of fish in the sea has been decreasing. In response, protestors blocked ferry exits and dumped fish in front of a local fishing committee.

== See also ==
- Renewable energy in France
- Solar power in France
- Renewable energy by country
- Wind power in the European Union
