= Yazid Mansouri =

Algerian footballer (born 1978)

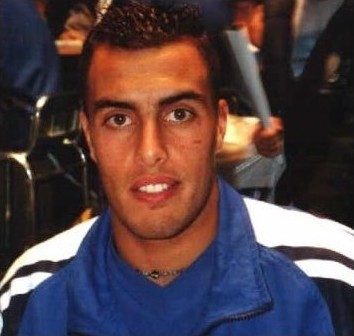

Personal information
- Date of birth: 25 February 1978 (age 48)
- Place of birth: Revin, France
- Height: 1.75 m (5 ft 9 in)
- Position: Midfielder

Team information
- Current team: JS Kabylie (sporting director)

Youth career
- 1994–1995: Tinqueux SC
- 1995–1997: Le Havre

Senior career*
Years	Team	Apps	(Gls)
1997–2004	Le Havre	134	(2)
2003–2004	→ Coventry City (loan)	14	(0)
2004–2006	Châteauroux	63	(2)
2006–2010	Lorient	112	(2)
2010–2011	Al Sailiya	15	(0)
2012–2013	CS Constantine	14	(0)
Total		352	(6)

International career
2001–2010	Algeria	67	(0)
- * Club domestic league appearances and goals

Yazid Mansouri (Arabic: يزيد منصوري, Yazīd Manṣūrī; Tamazight: ⵢⴰⵣⵉⴷ ⵎⴰⵏⵙⵓⵔⵉ; born 25 February 1978) is a former professional footballer who played as a midfielder. Born in France, he played for the Algeria national team, gaining 67 caps over ten years. He is the current sporting director of JS Kabylie.

== Club career ==
Born in Revin, Ardennes, France, Mansouri began his career at Tinqueux SC, a small team from Tinqueux who were playing in the sixth division. At age 17, he left the club and signed with Le Havre AC who were playing in Ligue 1, where he spent his first two seasons playing in the reserve side. He made his debut in the first game of the 1997–98 season, coming as a second-half substitute against Olympique de Marseille. He would slowly assert himself at the club and would eventually go on to make 134 appearances and scoring 2 goals in 6 seasons in both Ligue 1 and Ligue 2.

At the start of the 2003–04 season, Mansouri was loaned out for the season to English Championship side Coventry City F.C. Mansouri made 14 appearances in the first half of the season before leaving, against the clubs wishes, to play for Algeria at the 2004 African Cup of Nations in Mali. His contract was subsequently terminated and he remained without a club for the rest of the season.

In the summer of 2004, Mansouri signed with Ligue 2 side LB Châteauroux where he easily imposed himself in the middle of the park. He would go on to make 63 appearances for the club, starting every one of them, and scoring 2 goals. He was also the captain of the team in the 2005–2006 season.

At the beginning of the 2006 season, Mansouri signed a two-year contract with Ligue 1 side FC Lorient.

On 23 June 2010, Mansouri signed a Two-year contract with Qatari-side Al-Sailiya.

On 22 December 2011, Mansouri signed a contract until the end of the season with Algerian side CS Constantine.

== International career ==
Mansouri first featured for the Algerian national team in a set of friendlies against FC Zürich and ES Troyes in 1999. He received his first official call-up to the national team on 6 November 2001 in a friendly game against France in Paris. He was a member of the squad at the 2002 African Cup of Nations, 2004 African Cup of Nations and 2010 African Cup of Nations, where Algeria finished fourth.

Mansouri was a member of the Algerian squad at the 2010 World Cup; however, he lost the captaincy and a spot in the starting line-up prior to the first fixture against Slovenia and did not participate in any of the three games. Shortly after the 2010 World Cup, Mansouri announced his international retirement from international football on 26 June 2010, after mentioning to the media that he would not be participating in the friendly in August against Gabon and the 2012 African Cup of Nations qualifiers. With 67 appearances for the national team, he is the 9th most capped player in Algeria's history.

== Career statistics ==
=== International ===
Algeria national team
Year	Apps	Goals
2001	4	0
2002	6	0
2003	6	0
2004	9	0
2005	6	0
2006	5	0
2007	7	0
2008	7	0
2009	8	0
2010	9	0
Total	67	0
