= La Jourdanie (power station) =

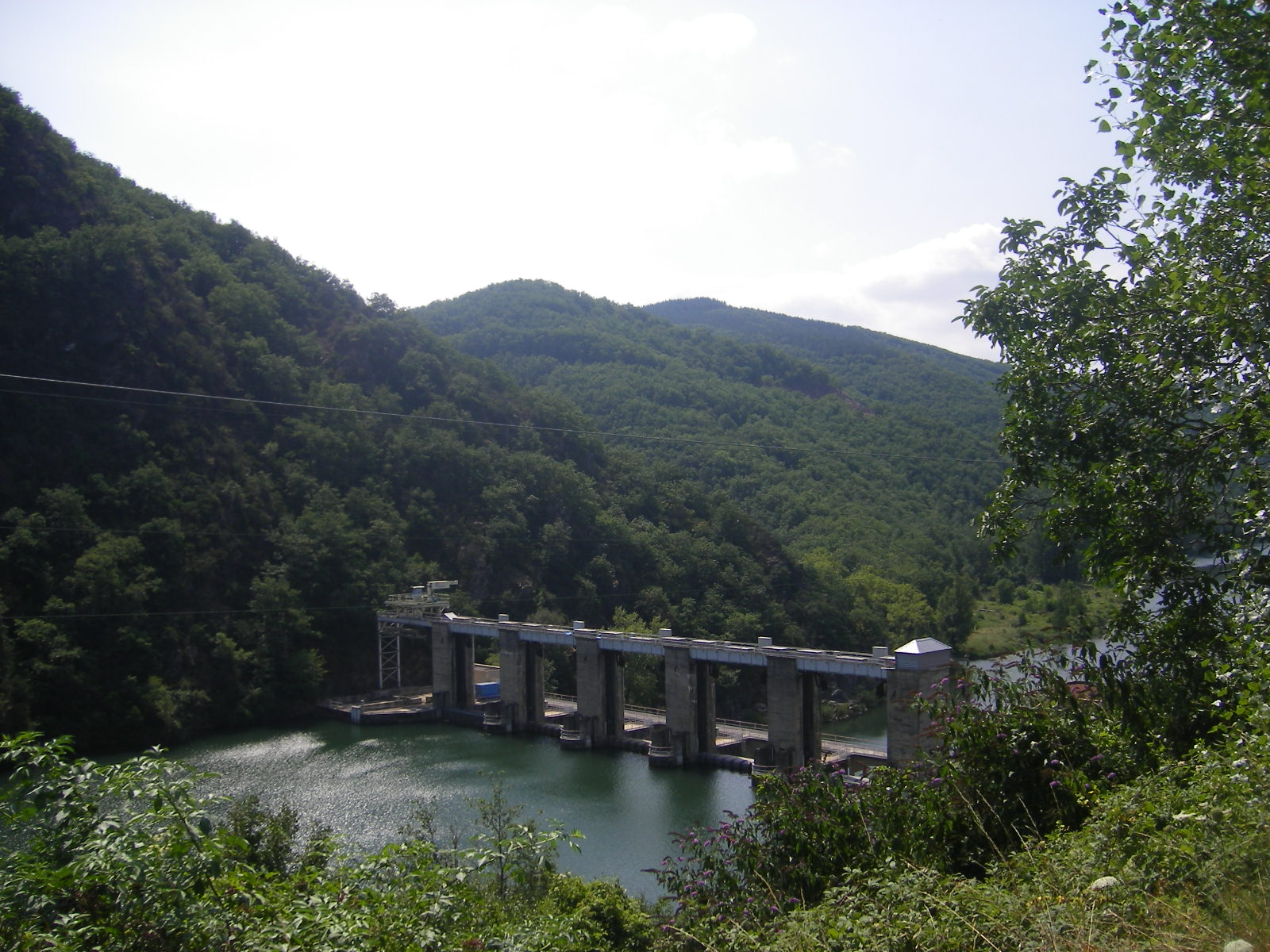
- La Jourdanie barrage and power station across the Tarn.
- Interactive map of La Jourdanie
- Country: France
- Location: Broquiès, Aveyron
- Coordinates: 44.0181°N 2.7141°E
- Construction began: 1932

Dam and spillways
- Height: 17 m (56 ft)
- Length: 100 m (330 ft)

Power Station
- Operator: EDF
- Type: Run-of-the-river
- Turbines: 2 x Kaplan turbine + 2 x helical turbine
- Installed capacity: 18 MW

La Jourdanie is a barrage and hydroelectric power station on the River Tarn in Broquiès in Aveyron, southern France.

The barrage was built in 1932, and the station has two Kaplan turbines and two helical turbines generating 18 megawatts (24,000 hp). The dam is 145 metres (476 ft) long and 17 metres (56 ft) high.

== See also ==
- Le Pouget (power station)
- Renewable energy in France
