= Viala-du-Tarn =

Commune in Occitanie, France

- Commune
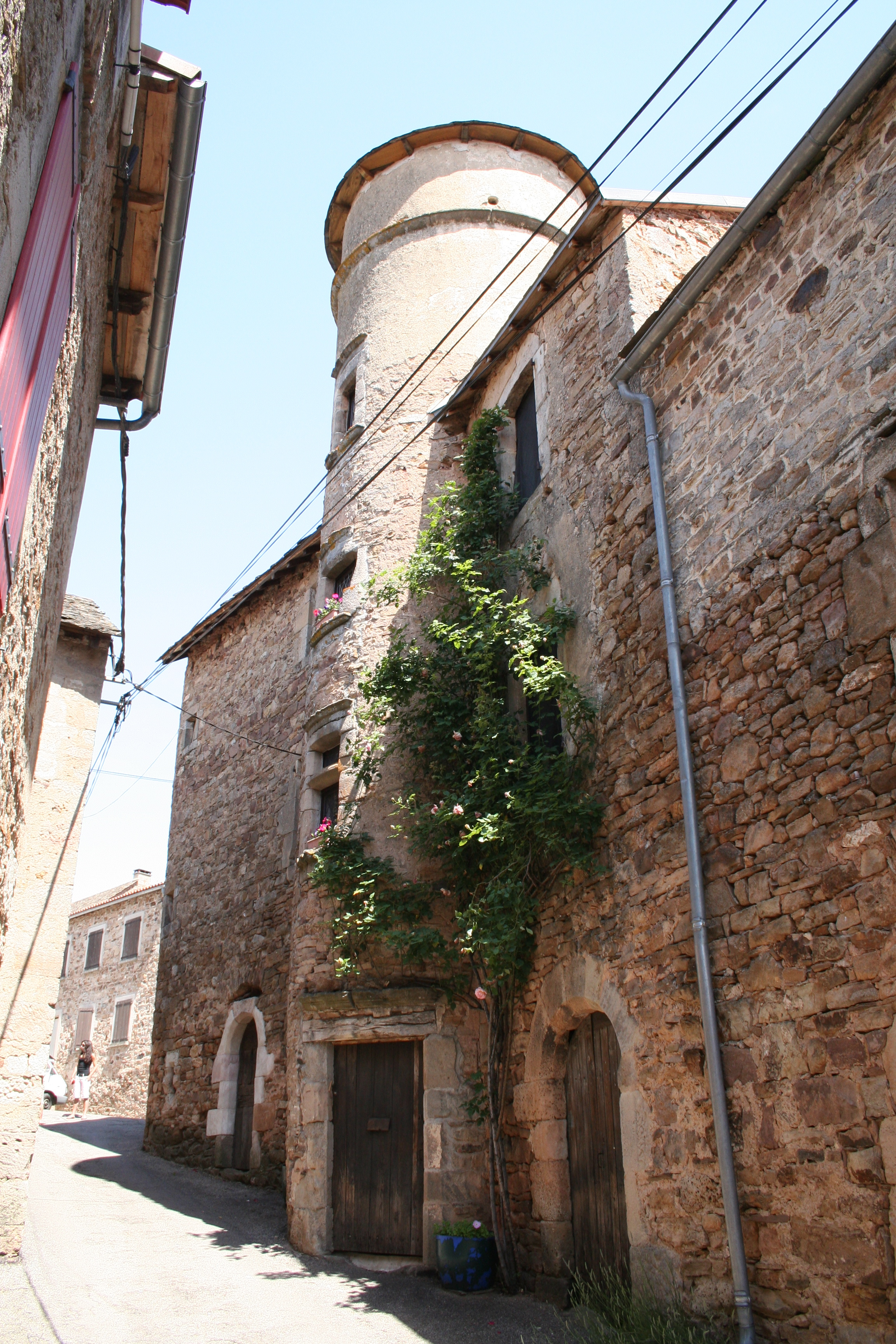
- Medieval tower in Viala-du-Tarn

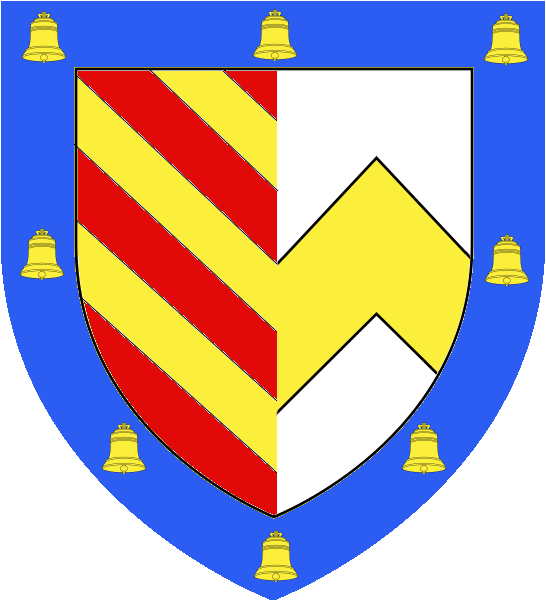
- Coat of arms
- Location of Viala-du-Tarn
- Location within France Location within Occitanie
- Coordinates: 44°04′23″N 2°52′42″E
- Country: France
- Region: Occitania
- Department: Aveyron
- Arrondissement: Millau
- Canton: Tarn et Causses
- Intercommunality: CC de la Muse et des Raspes du Tarn

Government
  - Mayor (2020–2026): Gérard Descotte
- Area^{1}: 38.56 km^{2} (14.89 sq mi)
- Elevation: 569 m (1,867 ft)
- Highest elevation: 1,050 m (3,440 ft)
- Lowest elevation: 300 m (980 ft)
- Population (2023): 529
  - Density: 13.7/km^{2} (35.5/sq mi)
- Time zone: UTC+01:00 (CET)
  - Summer (DST): UTC+02:00 (CEST)
- INSEE/Postal code: 12296 /12490
- ^{1} French Land Register data, which excludes lakes, ponds, glaciers > 1 km^{2} (0.386 sq mi or 247 acres) and river estuaries.

Viala-du-Tarn (French pronunciation: [vjala dy taʁn], literally Viala of the Tarn; Occitan: Lo Vialar de Tarn) is a commune in the Aveyron department in southern France.

The town of Le Viala dates from Medieval times and contains several interesting towers built in the 14th century. The administration of the Commune maintains a popular swimming beach and small boat access point on the Tarn.

== Population ==
Historical population
Year	Pop.	±% p.a.
1968	671	—
1975	581	−2.04%
1982	539	−1.07%
1990	533	−0.14%
1999	525	−0.17%
2007	539	+0.33%
2012	471	−2.66%
2017	504	+1.36%
2023	529	+0.81%
Source: INSEE

== See also ==
- Communes of the Aveyron department
