= Saint-Rome-de-Tarn =

Commune in Occitanie, France

- Commune
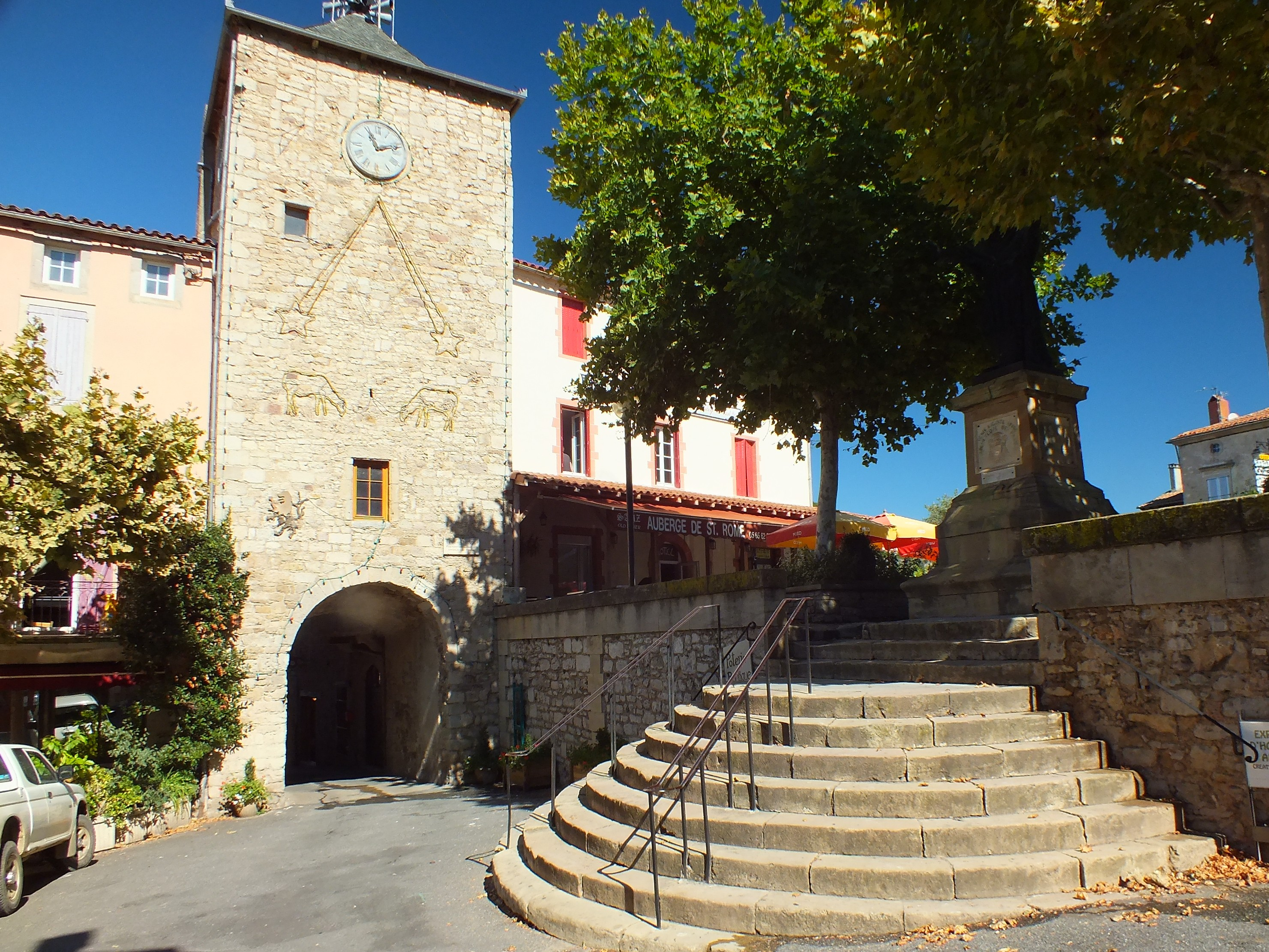
- The Place du Ravelin in Saint-Rome-de-Tarn

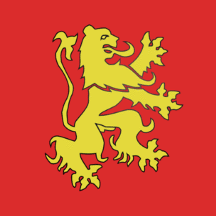
- Flag Coat of arms
- Location of Saint-Rome-de-Tarn
- Location within France Location within Occitanie
- Coordinates: 44°02′57″N 2°53′50″E
- Country: France
- Region: Occitania
- Department: Aveyron
- Arrondissement: Millau
- Canton: Raspes et Lévezou

Government
  - Mayor (2020–2026): Jacques Arlès
- Area^{1}: 52.06 km^{2} (20.10 sq mi)
- Elevation: 380 m (1,250 ft)
- Highest elevation: 665 m (2,182 ft)
- Lowest elevation: 300 m (980 ft)
- Population (2023): 904
  - Density: 17.4/km^{2} (45.0/sq mi)
- Time zone: UTC+01:00 (CET)
  - Summer (DST): UTC+02:00 (CEST)
- INSEE/Postal code: 12244 /12490
- ^{1} French Land Register data, which excludes lakes, ponds, glaciers > 1 km^{2} (0.386 sq mi or 247 acres) and river estuaries.

Saint-Rome-de-Tarn (French pronunciation: [sɛ̃ ʁɔm də taʁn], literally Saint-Rome of Tarn; Languedocien: Sant Roma de Tarn) is a commune in the Aveyron department in southern France.

== Population ==
Historical population
Year	Pop.	±% p.a.
1968	729	—
1975	669	−1.22%
1982	629	−0.88%
1990	676	+0.90%
1999	715	+0.63%
2007	835	+1.96%
2012	858	+0.54%
2017	871	+0.30%
2023	904	+0.62%
Source: INSEE

== See also ==
- Communes of the Aveyron department
