= Revin =

- Commune
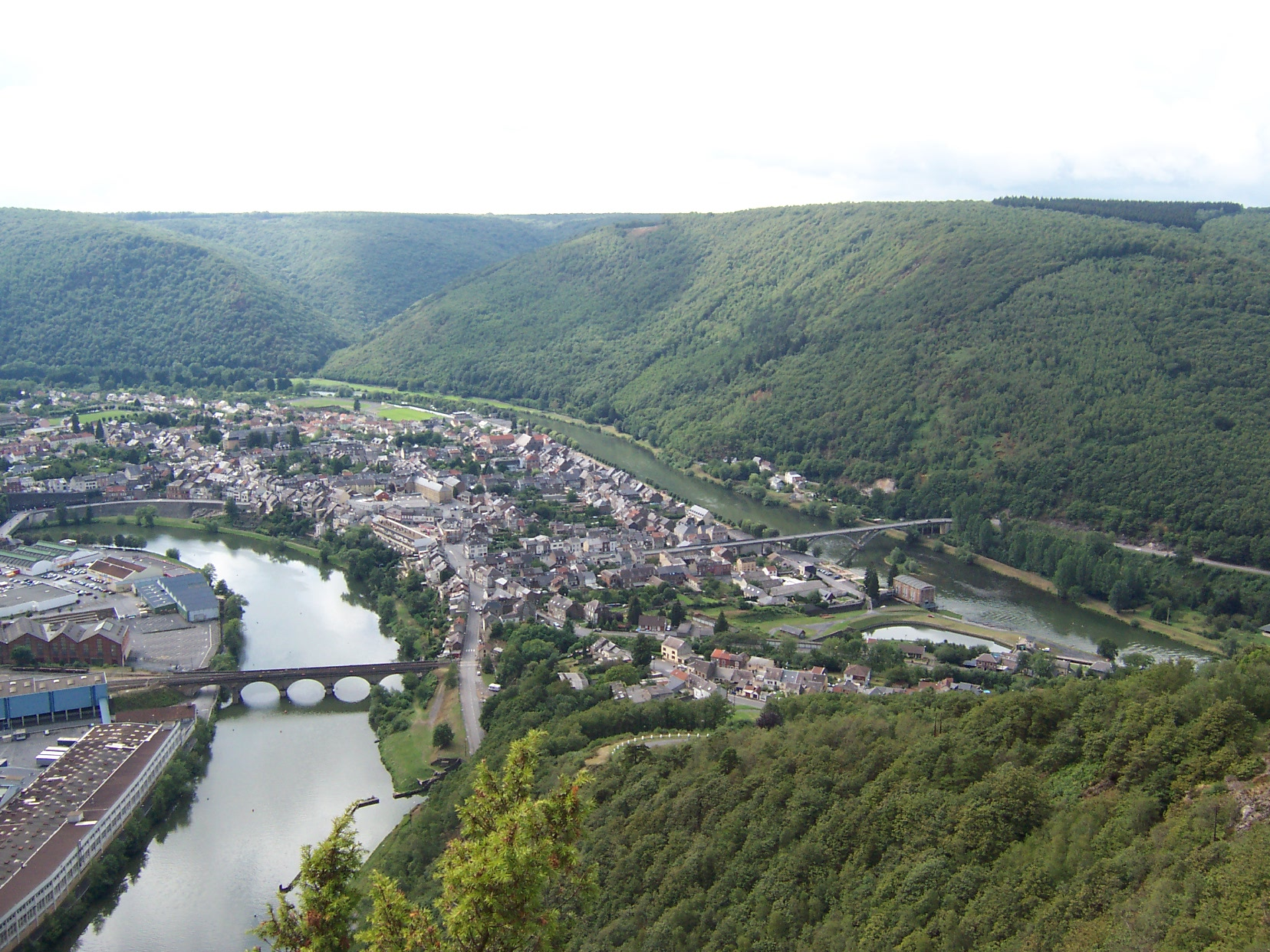
- A general view of Revin

- Coat of arms
- Location of Revin
- Location within France Location within Grand Est
- Coordinates: 49°56′00″N 4°38′00″E
- Country: France
- Region: Grand Est
- Department: Ardennes
- Arrondissement: Charleville-Mézières
- Canton: Revin
- Intercommunality: Ardenne rives de Meuse

Government
  - Mayor (2020–2026): Daniel Durbecq
- Area^{1}: 38.42 km^{2} (14.83 sq mi)
- Highest elevation: 469 m (1,539 ft)
- Lowest elevation: 117 m (384 ft)
- Population (2023): 5,716
  - Density: 148.8/km^{2} (385.3/sq mi)
- Time zone: UTC+01:00 (CET)
  - Summer (DST): UTC+02:00 (CEST)
- INSEE/Postal code: 08363 /08500
- ^{1} French Land Register data, which excludes lakes, ponds, glaciers > 1 km^{2} (0.386 sq mi or 247 acres) and river estuaries.

Revin (French pronunciation: [ʁəvɛ̃]) is a commune in the Ardennes department in the Grand Est region in northern France.

Revin is situated on the banks of the Meuse. The Revin Pumped Storage Power Plant is near Revin.

== Population ==
Historical population

Year	Pop.	±% p.a.
1793	1,787	—
1800	1,652	−1.12%
1806	1,812	+1.55%
1821	1,944	+0.47%
1831	2,123	+0.88%
1836	2,309	+1.69%
1841	2,631	+2.65%
1846	2,765	+1.00%
1851	2,947	+1.28%
1866	3,208	+0.57%
1872	3,367	+0.81%
1876	3,550	+1.33%
1881	4,136	+3.10%
1886	4,027	−0.53%
1891	4,292	+1.28%
1896	4,690	+1.79%
1901	5,038	+1.44%
1906	5,377	+1.31%

Year	Pop.	±% p.a.
1911	5,924	+1.96%
1921	5,513	−0.72%
1926	6,996	+4.88%
1931	7,999	+2.72%
1936	7,826	−0.44%
1946	6,551	−1.76%
1954	8,498	+3.31%
1962	11,244	+3.56%
1968	12,156	+1.31%
1975	11,607	−0.66%
1982	10,465	−1.47%
1990	9,371	−1.37%
1999	8,963	−0.49%
2007	7,687	−1.90%
2012	6,979	−1.91%
2017	6,239	−2.22%
2023	5,716	−1.45%

Source: EHESS and INSEE (1968-2023)

== Personalities ==
Yazid Mansouri, the Algeria national football team captain was born in Revin.

== See also ==
- Communes of the Ardennes department
- Former industrial areas in western Europe were hurting even before the economic crisis, by Paul Ames. 12 Feb 2010.
