= List of power stations in France =

The following page lists all power stations in France.

== Geothermal ==
Station	Location	Capacity (MW)
Bouillante 2 Power Plant	Bouillante, Guadeloupe	15

== Nuclear ==
Name	Location	Coordinates	Type	Capacity (MW)	Entered operation	Notes	Photo
Belleville NPP	Belleville-sur-Loire	47.510534°N 2.8761864°E	PWR (pressurized water reactor)	2,620 (2 x 1,310)	1987-1988	Reactor supplier Framatome; T/G supplier Alstom	Belleville NPP
Blayais NPP	Braud-et-Saint-Louis	45.255833°N 0.693056°W	PWR	3,640 (4 x 910)	1981-1983	Reactor supplier Framatome; T/G supplier Alstom	Blayais NPP
Bugey	Saint-Vulbas	45.798333°N 5.270833°E	PWR	3,580 (2 x 910, 2 x 880)	1979-1980	Reactor supplier Framatome; T/G supplier Alstom; One 550 MW GCR reactor operational from 1972-1994	Bugey NPP
Cattenom NPP	Cattenom	49.4158°N 6.2181°E	PWR	5,200 (4 x 1,300)	1986-1991	Reactor supplier Framatome; T/G supplier Alstom	Cattenom NPP
Chinon NPP	Avoine	47.230556°N 0.170556°E	PWR	3,620 (4 X 905)	1988	Reactor supplier Framatome; T/G supplier Alstom and 3 GCR reactors were retired (70 180 and 360 MW)	Chinon NPP
Chooz-B NPP	Chooz	50.09°N 4.789444°E	PWR	3,000 (2 x 1,500)	1998-2000	Reactor supplier Framatome; T/G supplier Alstom; Chooz-A is the first PWR reactor in Europe with capacity 310MWe; began operation Apr 1967 and retired 1991	Chooz NPP
Civaux NPP	Civaux	46.456667°N 0.652778°E	PWR	2,990 (2 x 1,495)	1998-2000	Reactor supplier Framatome; T/G supplier Alstom	Civaux NPP
Cruas NPP	Cruas	44.633056°N 4.756667°E	PWR	3,660 (4 X 915)	1983-1984	Reactor supplier Framatome; T/G supplier Alstom	Cruas NPP The power plant at night
Dampierre NPP	Dampierre-en-Burly	47.7336808°N 2.5172853°E	PWR	3,560 (4 x 890)	1980-1981	Reactor supplier Framatome; T/G supplier Alstom	Dampierre NPP
Flamanville NPP	Flamanville	49.536389°N 1.881667°W	PWR	4,230 (2 x 1,330, 1 x 1,570)	1985-2020	Reactor supplier Framatome; T/G supplier Alstom the first EPR (PWR 3rd generation) reactor in France, under construction, production's startup expected in 2020, the 100th reactor ordered from Framatome	Flamanville NPP (the third reactor is under construction)
Golfech NPP	Golfech	44.1067°N 0.8453°E	PWR	2,620 (2 x 1,310)	1991-1993	Reactor supplier Framatome; T/G supplier Alstom	Golfech NPP
Gravelines NPP	Gravelines	51.015278°N 2.136111°E	PWR	5,460 (6 x 910)	1980-1985	Reactor supplier Framatome; T/G supplier Alstom	Gravelines NPP
Nogent NPP	Nogent-sur-Seine	48.515278°N 3.517778°E	PWR	2,620 (2 x 1,310)	1987-1988	Reactor supplier Framatome; T/G supplier Alstom	Nogent-sur-Seine NPP
Paluel NPP	Paluel	49.858056°N 0.635556°E	PWR	5,400 (4 x 1,300)	1985-1986	Reactor supplier Framatome; T/G supplier Alstom	Paluel NPP
Penly NPP	Penly	49.976667°N 1.211944°E	PWR	2,660 (2 x 1,330)	1990-1992	Reactor supplier Framatome; T/G supplier Alstom	Penly NPP
Saint-Alban NPP	Saint-Alban-du-Rhône	45.4042957°N 4.7555351°E	PWR	2,670 (2 x 1,335)	1985-1986	Reactor supplier Framatome; T/G supplier Alstom	Saint-Alban NPP
Saint-Laurent-B NPP	Saint-Laurent-Nouan	47.72°N 1.5775°E	PWR	1,830 (2 x 915)	1981	Reactor supplier Framatome; T/G supplier Alstom and 2 GCR reactors were retired (500 and 530 MW)	Saint-Laurent-des-Eaux NPP
Tricastin NPC	Bollène	44.329722°N 4.732222°E	PWR	3,660 (4 x 915)	1983-1984	Reactor supplier Framatome; T/G supplier Alstom	Tricastin NPP in the foreground (the 2 cooling tower belong to the old uranium enrichment plant in the background (which consumes 3/4 of the Tricastin Plant output))
Retired reactors
Brennilis NPP	Brennilis	48.3533°N 3.872203°W	HWGCR (heavy water gas-cooled reactor)	70	1967 retired 1985	heavy water reactor, only one of its kind in France	Brennilis NPP
Fessenheim NPP	Fessenheim	47.9032247°N 7.5623059°E	PWR	1,760 (2x 880)	1977 (retired 2020)	Reactor supplier Framatome; T/G supplier Alstom; Unit 1 closed in February 2020 and Unit 2 in June.	Fessenheim NPP
Marcoule-G1	Bagnols-sur-Cèze	44.143333°N 4.709444°E	GCR (gas-cooled reactor)	5	1956 retired 1968	Reactor supplier SACM; T/G supplier Rateau	Marcoule nuclear site. G1 is the yellow building
Marcoule-G2 & G3	Bagnols-sur-Cèze	44.143333°N 4.709444°E	GCR	86 (2 x 43)	1959 retired 1984	Reactor supplier SACM; T/G supplier Rateau	G2 and G3 at Marcoule
Phénix	Bagnols-sur-Cèze	44.143333°N 4.711667°E	FBR (Fast Breeder reactor)	250	1973 retired 2009	Reactor supplier CEM; T/G supplier CEM	on the left : Phénix reactor; on the right G2 & G3
Superphénix	Creys-Mépieu	45.758333°N 5.472222°E	FBR	1,242	1986 retired 1998	Reactor supplier Novatome; T/G supplier Ansaldo	Superphénix reactor

== Thermal ==
Name	Location	Coordinates	Capacity (MW)	Operational	Notes
Provence Power Station	Gardanne	43.468°N 5.486°E	750 MW (600 MW (coal) + 150 MW (wood-fired))	1958-2021	297 m tall chimney, managed by GazelEnergie. Unit 4 b in partial operation with coal units decommissioned.
Le Havre Power Station	Le Havre	49.475°N 0.148°E	600 MW (coal)	1969-2021	managed by EDF
Cordemais Power Station	Cordemais	47.276°N 1.877°W	1,200 MW (2 × 600 MW (coal))	1967-today	managed by EDF
Émile Huchet Power Station	Saint-Avold	49.153°N 6.703°E	1,478 MW (1 × 618 MW (coal) + 2* 430 MW (gas))	1948-today	Unit 6 coal in partial operation, managed by GazelEnergie

== Hydroelectric ==
Station	Location	Coordinates	Capacity (MW)
Grand'Maison Dam	Isère		1800
Charmes Dam	Beauchastel	44.823757°N 4.811239°E	223
Bort-les-Orgues Dam	Bort-les-Orgues	45.413289°N 2.497512°E	240
La Roche de Glun Dam	Bourg lès Valence	45.010397°N 4.839448°E	186
Caderousse dam	Caderousse	44.095934°N 4.723075°E	156
Chastang Dam	Belvedere	45.151825°N 2.010005°E	282
Rochemaure Dam	Chateauneuf du Rhône	44.592568°N 4.726374°E	285
Donzère-Mondragon (Bollène) dam	Saint-Pierre de Senos	44.303735°N 4.742425°E	354
Eguzon dam	Éguzon-Chantôme	46.454778°N 1.612759°E	72
Génissiat Dam	Génissiat	46.052714°N 5.812862°E	396
l'Aigle Dam	Aynes	45.243727°N 2.224817°E	133
Marèges Dam	Marèges	45.391798°N 2.364335°E	272
Monteynard Power Station	La Motte Saint Martin	44.961181°N 5.688751°E	364
Le Pouget	Mas Audran	44.059990°N 2.768597°E	444.5
La Bâthie Power Station	Boudin	45.685437°N 6.622497°E	546
Sarrans dam	Sarrans	44.829479°N 2.740515°E	155
Saulce sur Rhône (Loriol Le Pouzin Dam)	Le Pouzin	44.737391°N 4.763410°E	211
Serre-Ponçon Power Station	Rousset	44.471644°N 6.270618°E	380
Tignes Dam (Brevieres/Malgovert)	Tignes	45.494815°N 6.932142°E	428
Vallorcine Power Station (Emosson Dam)	Vallorcine	46°04′03″N 6°55′56″E	189
Vogelgrun Power Station	Vogelgrun	48.020257°N 7.573829°E	140
Vouglans Dam	Vouglans	46.397417°N 5.665560°E	262
Revin Pumped Storage Power Plant	Revin	49.925556°N 4.613333°E	800
Montézic Power Station	Montézic	44.737778°N 2.643056°E	910
Bissorte Dam	Maurienne Valley	45.180278°N 6.579167°E	742

== See also ==
- List of power stations in Europe
- List of largest power stations in the world
