= Bissorte Dam =

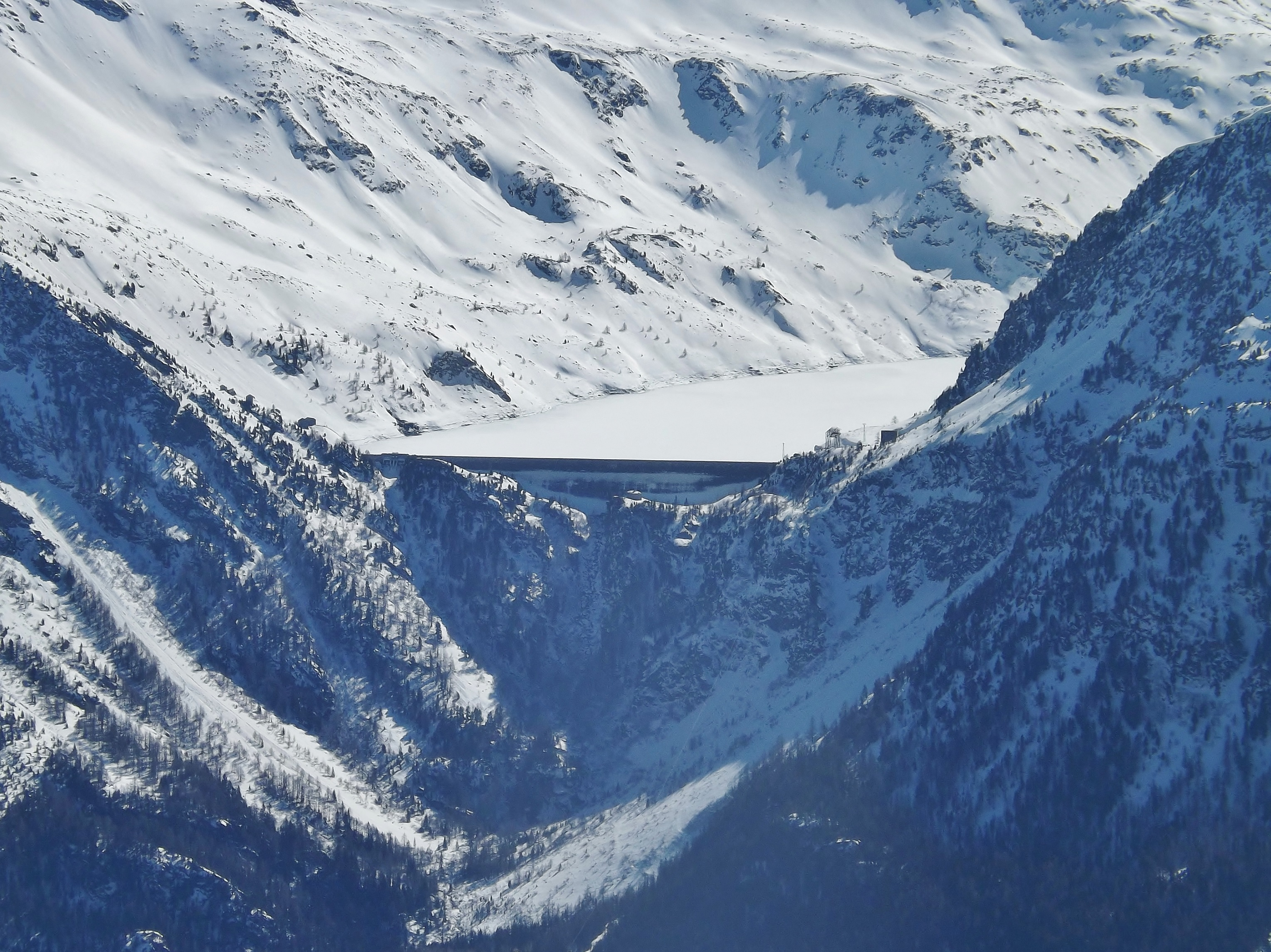
- View of the dam in winter, from the Cime de Caron

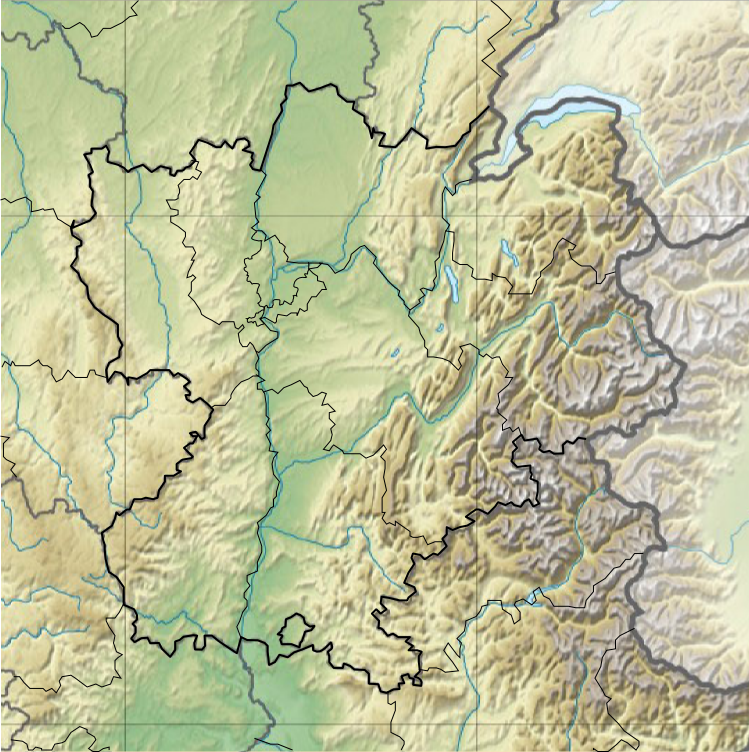
- Location of the Bissorte Dam in the Rhône-Alpes region of France
- Official name: Barrage de Bissorte
- Country: France
- Location: Valmeinier, Savoie
- Coordinates: 45°10′49″N 6°34′45″E
- Purpose: Power
- Status: Operational
- Construction began: 1930
- Opening date: 1935

Dam and spillways
- Type of dam: Gravity dam
- Impounds: Bissorte River, tributary of the Arc
- Height (thalweg): 63 m (207 ft)
- Length: 545 m (1,788 ft)
- Width (base): 49 m (161 ft)

Reservoir
- Creates: Bissorte Lake (Lac de Bissorte)
- Total capacity: 40,000,000 m^{3} (32,000 acre⋅ft)
- Normal elevation: 2,050 m (6,730 ft)

Bissorte and Super-Bissorte
- Operator: EDF
- Commission date: 1935 and 1986
- Type: Pumped-storage
- Hydraulic head: 1,144 m (3,753 ft)
- Turbines: Bissorte 1: 3 x 25 MW Pelton turbines Bissorte 2: 4 x 150 MW Francis pump-turbines Bissorte 3: 1 x 150 MW Pelton turbine
- Installed capacity: 800 MW (combined)

The Bissorte Dam (French: Barrage de Bissorte) is a gravity dam in the Maurienne Valley, in Savoie, France, about 7 km (4.3 mi) east of Valmeinier. It was built from 1930 to 1935 to supply a hydroelectric plant capable of generating 75 megawatts (MW) of power.

The complex was reconfigured from 1980 to 1986 in order to add a 750 MW pumped-storage power plant known as Super-Bissorte, the third-most-powerful in France after Grand'Maison and Montézic.

== Location ==
The Bissorte Dam is perched on an ancient glacial basin, now alpine tundra, in the Massif des Cerces. It is close to the Valfréjus ski resort in the commune of Modane, near the Italian border.

== History ==
During the 1920s, a period of intense stock market speculation on hydroelectricity in France, Bissorte's potential as a building site drew much attention. In 1930, work began on the construction of a 545-meter-long (1,788-foot) gravity dam with a stone facing to protect its concrete structure. The power plant, known today as Bissorte 1, was put into operation in 1935 and can output 75 MW in a matter of minutes thanks to its three Pelton turbines.

In 1980, the electric utility company Électricité de France (EDF, Electricity of France) built a second dam, the Pont des Chèvres, on the Arc River below Bissorte and reorganized the power plant into a pumped-storage facility. Through the use of a new underground penstock, water that had been released through the turbines during times of peak energy demand would be pumped from the lower reservoir back into the upper one during times of lower consumption, replenishing the plant's supply of water and enabling a balanced production of power. Super-Bissorte, the new addition to the complex, was commissioned in 1986. It comprises two underground facilities, called Bissorte 2 and Bissorte 3, which can generate 750 MW through the use of four 150 MW reversible Francis pump-turbines and a 150 MW Pelton turbine.

The Bissorte concession agreement, which grants EDF the rights to operate the facility, expired at the end of 2014 and will be put up for bid, according to the Law of 16 Octobre 1919.

== Design ==
The Bissorte Dam, which forms the upper reservoir (2,050 meters; 6,730 feet elevation), is a gravity dam on the Bissorte River (8.8 kilometers (5.5 miles) long). It is 545 meters (1,788 feet) long and 49 meters (161 feet) wide at the base. A stone facing protects its concrete structure. The reservoir, Lake Bissorte (Lac de Bissorte), holds a water volume of 40,000,000 m^{3} (32,000 acre⋅ft) that can now be brought to a maximum of 100,000,000 m^{3} (81,000 acre⋅ft) after additional work was completed in 1957.

A second reservoir, situated on the Arc River downstream from the Bissorte Dam, is formed by the Pont des Chèvres Dam (925 meters (3,035 feet) elevation), a gate-structure dam. It serves to stabilize the flow of tailwater from the Bissorte and Orelle plants, and functions as the lower reservoir in the pumped-storage system used by Super-Bissorte, one of France's major pumped-storage power stations, known as STEP (Stations de transfert d'énergie par pompage). The reservoir holds 1,500,000 m^{3} (1,200 acre⋅ft) of water.

== Penstocks ==
The original penstock, installed to pipe water into Bissorte 1, was a novelty at the time of its construction thanks to its stiffener rings, metal bands that provide reinforcement against the high pressure of the water. A second penstock was installed underground with the addition of Super-Bissorte.

== Hydroelectric plants ==
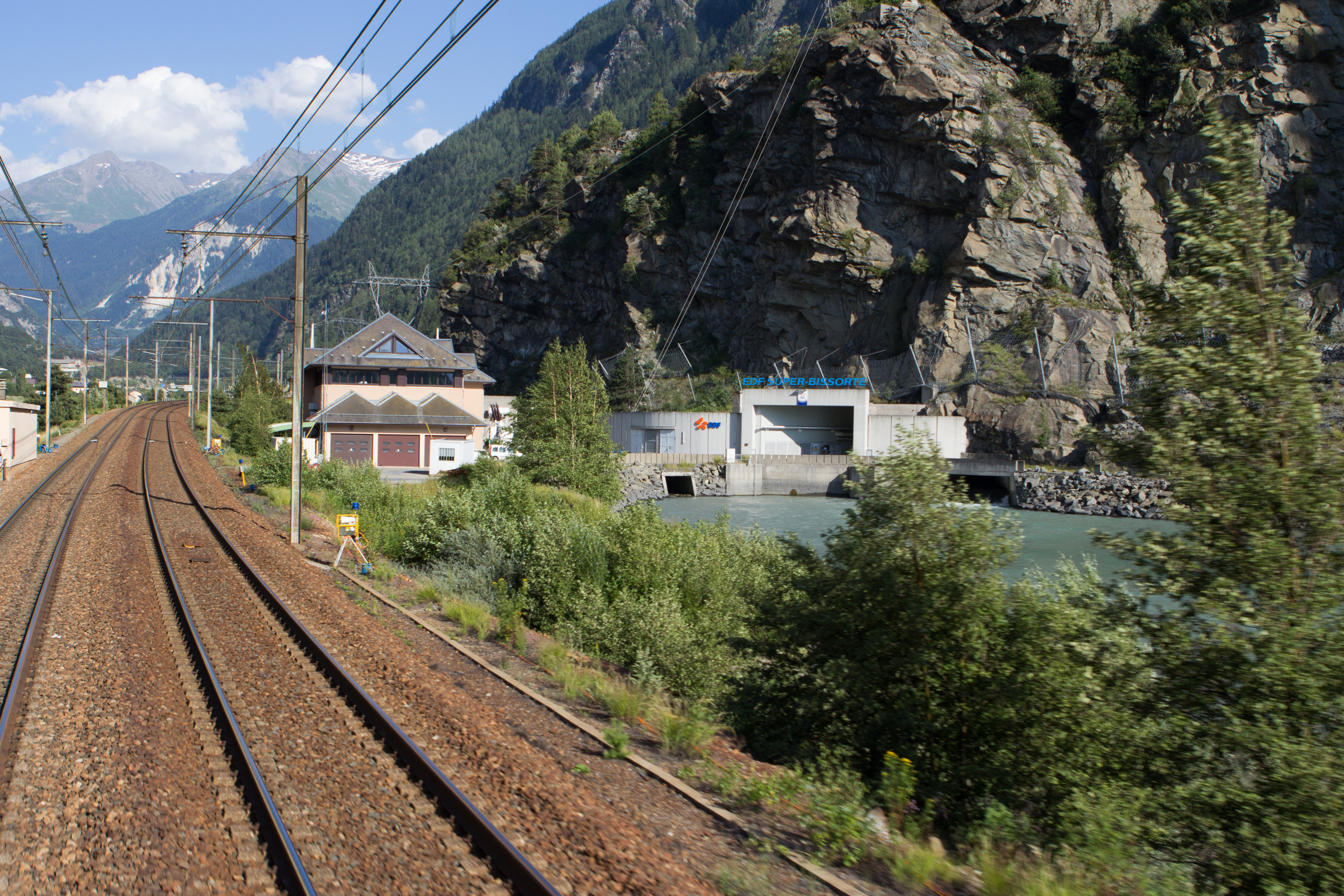
View of the Bissorte 1 power station and the entrance tunnel to Super Bissorte from the Culoz–Modane railway

Bissorte 1 is equipped with three horizontal Pelton turbines that can output 25 MW each. It is 1,144 meters (3,753 feet) below the water level of Lake Bissorte.

Super-Bissorte is composed of two underground facilities: Bissorte 2, outfitted with four 150 MW reversible Francis pump-turbines, and Bissorte 3, furnished with a 150 MW vertical Pelton turbine.

== Pumped-storage system ==
Super-Bissorte, like the other STEP facilities, is a strategic element of France's power grid. It provides a way to restore electricity in case of a power outage, like the one that occurred during the Europe-wide blackout on November 6, 2006. Due to an error of judgement on the part of a German electric company, French and Spanish power networks found themselves in abrupt isolation and unable to meet demand. However, the Réseau de Transport d'Électricité (RTE, Electricity Transmission Network) was able to offset the shortage by mobilizing nine hydroelectric dams: “At 22:15 hours, the hydroelectric plants of Bort, Montézic, Grand Maison, Villarodin, and Sarran-Bromat augmented production by 2,800 MW, followed by an increase of 1,140 MW at 22:20 hours from the Tignes, Super-Bissorte, La Bathie and Monteynard plants.”

== See also ==
- Renewable energy in France
