= Plogoff nuclear power plant project =

Plogoff nuclear power plant

Plogoff nuclear power plant
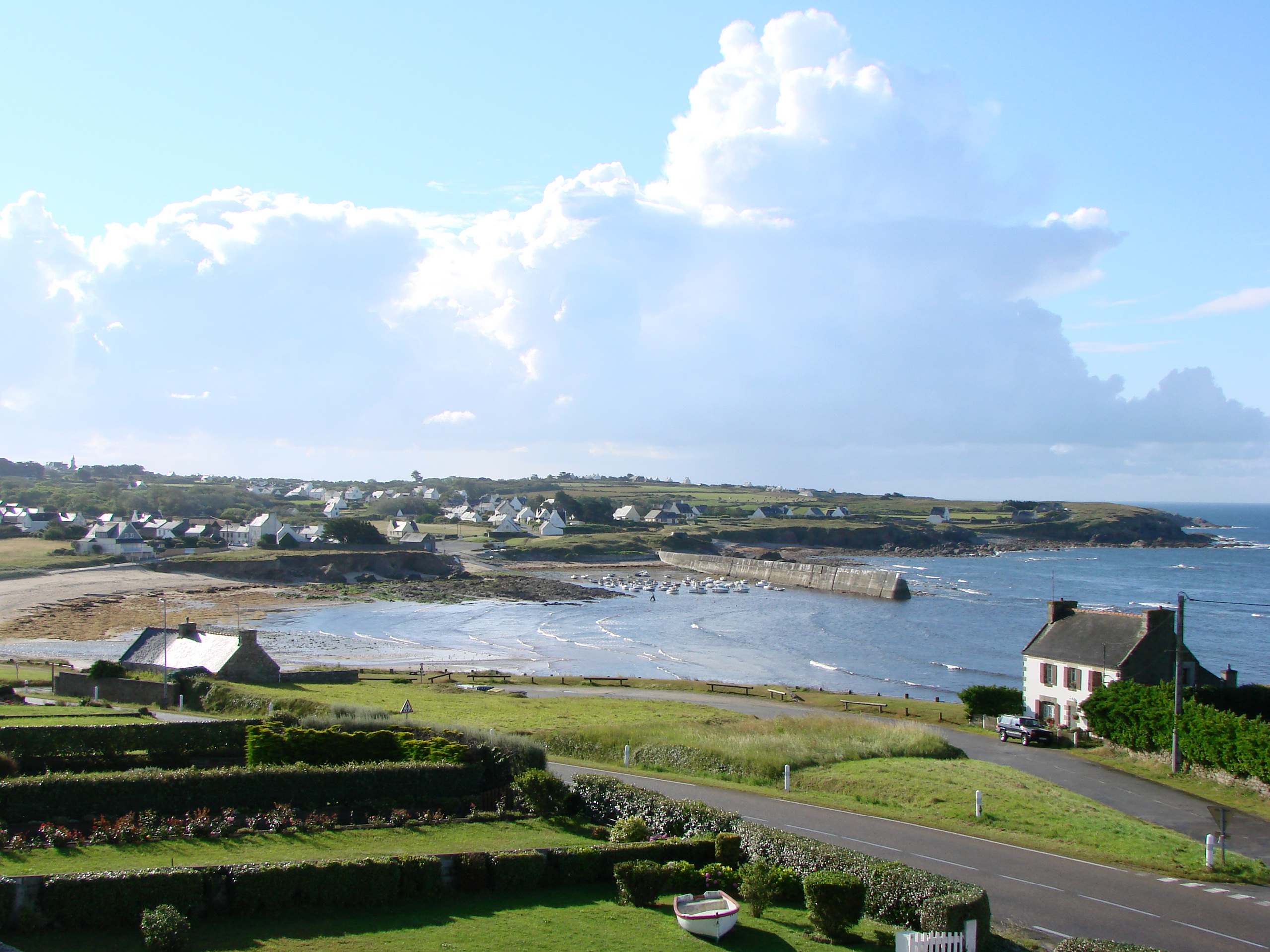
- Country: France
- Location: Plogoff, Finistère
- Coordinates: 48°02′15″N 04°39′53″W
- Status: Cancelled
- Operator: Électricité de France

The Plogoff nuclear power plant project was an EDF project to build a nuclear power plant in the commune of Plogoff in Finistère, Brittany. Popular mobilization against the project between 1978 and 1981 led to its abandonment. This anti-nuclear movement was part of a period marked by the birth of political ecology worldwide.

== Plogoff site ==
Plogoff is a commune in Basse-Bretagne, near the Pointe du Raz in Finistère. The nuclear power plant would have been located on the edge of Audierne Bay.

== Chronology of events ==
In response to the first oil crisis in October 1973, the first Pierre Messmer government accelerated the civil nuclear program, and on March 5, 1974, launched an ambitious program of 13 900-megawatt units over six years (at an estimated cost of 13 billion francs), with plans to build 200 power plants in France by 2000.

In 1975, the General Councils and the Economic and Social Council agreed in principle to build a nuclear power plant in Brittany on 167 hectares of Breton moorland (4 generating units of 1,300 MW each, for a total capacity of 5,200 MW). Five sites have been identified for prospecting in Brittany: Beg an Fry in Guimaëc, Ploumoguer, Plogoff (near Pointe du Raz), Saint-Vio in Tréguennec and Erdeven. In June 1976, EDF engineers began drilling the first exploratory boreholes, triggering the first major reactions from the local population, which until then had been largely uninformed. The mobilization in Erdeven and Ploumoguer (Note: What's more, Ploumoguer is considered too close to Brest, just as Le Pellerin is considered too close to Nantes.) was such that these sites were quickly ruled out.

A defense committee was formed on June 6, at the initiative of the mayor of Plogoff, Jean-Marie Kerloch. On June 8, Plogoffites set up barricades at the entrance to their commune for three days, as EDF geologists and technicians were forced to give way. On September 11, 1978, this committee decided to create a GFA (based on the Larzac model) to make expropriation procedures more difficult. Despite the structuring of the anti-nuclear movement, (Note: "The first demonstrations in France didn't take place until 1971, against the Fessenheim and Bugey power plant projects. The first anti-nuclear demonstration in Brittany didn't take place until 1973, in Brennilis, and attracted no more than 90 participants. Cf. Tudi Kernalegenn, "Bretagne et écologie: approche culturelle d'une dynamique identitaire", in Dugales (N.), Le Coadic (R.), Patez (F.) (dir.), Et la Bretagne? Héritage, identité, projets, Rennes, PUR, 2004, p. 217) notably through CLINs and CRINs, (Note: Comité Local d'Information Nucléaire and Comité Régional d'Information Nucléaire organize information campaigns and anti-nuclear festivals featuring concerts, debates and shows.) the Plogoff site was selected on September 12 and 25, 1978 by the Conseil économique et social de Bretagne and the Conseil général du Finistère. On November 29, 1978, the General Council of Finistère voted 28 to 17 in favor of building a nuclear power plant at Plogoff, marking the end of the period of the "strolling power plant".

Citizen opposition continued unabated: in early May 1979, the defense committee decided to install the Feunteun-Aod alternative sheepfold on the GFA. On January 30, 1980, the files for the public utility inquiry were received at Plogoff town hall, where they were burnt that very afternoon. The prefectural authorities responded by hiring vans to act as "annex town halls" (protected by gendarmes) to gather the population's favorable opinions, so that the public utility inquiry could begin on January 31, 1980.

During the public inquiry, a free radio station - Radio Plogoff - began broadcasting. It broadcast radio programs until the Socialist victory in 1981.

After the public inquiry, demonstrations took place, leading to sometimes violent clashes with the CRS. On several occasions, demonstrators were arrested and put on trial for damaging public buildings and throwing projectiles, with the struggle now seen as a battle of "stones against guns".

On March 16, 1980, 50,000 people demonstrated to mark the closure of the public utility inquiry. On May 24, 1980, 100 to 150,000 demonstrators celebrated the end of the procedure, with 50 to 60,000 staying on for the fest-noz that brought the festivities to a close.

On April 9, 1981, at his rally in Brest, candidate François Mitterrand declared that Plogoff "does not figure, nor will it figure" in the nuclear plan he would implement if elected. In keeping with his campaign promise, the press release of June 3, 1981, issued after the Council of Ministers of President Mitterrand's Mauroy government, confirmed the abandonment of plans to extend the Larzac military camp and build the Plogoff nuclear power plant. Instead, two coal-fired units, each rated at 600 MW, were added to the Cordemais power plant in 1983 and 1984. A 446 MW gas-fired combined-cycle power plant in the commune of Landivisiau, in the north of the Finistère département, goes into production on March 31, 2022.

== The Plogoff women ==
Women played a particularly important role in this mobilization. Many were seamen's wives, and therefore often single homemakers. Along with young people and pensioners, they are the most present in the village and very active in this struggle.

When the vans, protected by mobile guards, were set up to act as a town hall annex, the women began a war of nerves with the gendarmes. During the six weeks of the public inquiry, they mobilized daily, spending hours and sometimes days in front of the guards, talking to them and sometimes discouraging the younger ones. At 5 p.m., as the women leave the town hall, they are joined by men and anti-nuclear activists from the region. This "five o'clock mass" often takes a more violent turn, involving the use of Molotov cocktails, with the gendarmes retaliating with offensive grenades.

During the clashes, women were also in the front ranks, blocking the way of the gendarmes. They included Annie Carval, now president of the defense committee (in place of Jean-Marie Kerloc'h, who was accused of allowing himself to be influenced by EDF), and Amélie Kerloc'h, first deputy and then mayor of the commune. The latter encouraged residents to block access to Plogoff to make it "an island inaccessible to the police".

A film, Plogoff, des pierres contre des fusils, recounts the events and shows the mobilization of the women, who harassed the young mobile guards every day, causing several of them to break down. At the head of the Plogoff mobilization are Amélie Kerloc'h, Plogoff's first deputy mayor, who is seen in the film urging outraged demonstrators to "make Plogoff an island", and Annie Carval, president of the defense committee. Plogoff, des pierres contre des fusils was directed by Nicole Le Garrec, with Félix Le Garrec as a cinematographer and Jakez Bernard as a sound technician. Released in November 1980 (before the project was abandoned), the film was restored in 2019 and selected for Cannes Classics 2019 (the Cannes Film Festival's selection of heritage films). It was re-released in cinemas on February 12.

A book entitled Femmes de Plogoff (Women of Plogoff) has been published by Renée Conan and Annie Laurent. In it, they recount how they learned to fight, the violence they had to face, The changes in their family lives during this time, the courage they showed, and the connections they forged with each other and with other struggles elsewhere.

A show based on the book was staged by Laëtitia Rouxel (drawing), Brigitte Stanislas (reading), and Patrice Paichereau (music).

== Law enforcement ==
Seven squadrons of mobile gendarmes were stationed in Pont-Croix and Loctudy, and intervened in Plogoff. Gendarmes-parachutistes were deployed as reinforcements.

The mobile gendarmes sometimes use wheeled armored vehicles at Plogoff. A helicopter watched over the demonstrators. It was there to protect the movement of the annexed city halls. Military engineering vehicles from Angers were mobilized to breach the barricades.

In terms of weaponry, incapacitating grenades were used in large numbers, including "instant tear-gas grenades" (tolite + CS gas) (e.g. 85 on Friday, March 14, the last day of the public inquiry). Ethyl bromoacetate, although banned, seems to have been used by urban police during riots in Quimper, who are said to have disposed of old stocks.

== Consequences ==
Following a major mobilization, the project was abandoned, a first in France. The previous year, a demonstration at Creys-Malville had had tragic consequences: one demonstrator was killed, and many others injured, including a mobile guard whose hand was torn off. Parallel to this action, demonstrations occurred at Le Pellerin, near Nantes, where another nuclear power plant was planned. This was abandoned in 1983, as promised by Socialist candidate François Mitterrand, before being replaced by another project, the Le Carnet nuclear power plant, also abandoned in 1997.

== Posterity ==
The Tri Yann music group, opposed to the project, wrote the eponymous song for the album An heol a zo glaz, released in 1981. Kan ar kann (Breton for "song of combat") describes the struggle of the people of Plogoff to oppose the construction of a nuclear power plant.

The Iroise Marine Natural Park was created by decree on September 28, 2007. Covering an area of 3,500 km^{2}, it is likely to be extended, with a proposal to the communes of Cap Sizun (of which Plogoff is a part) to involve them in decision-making and take into account the ecological and socio-economic coherence of the professional and leisure activity basins.

On April 22, 2021, France 3 broadcast the film Plogoff, les révoltés du nucléaire (2021, France, 55 minutes) by François Reinhardt.

In 2022, Claire Trévien wrote a poetry collection, Our Lady of Tyres, based on the Affaire Plogoff. The bilingual edition was a Poetry Book Society Summer 2022 Translation Choice.

== See also ==
- Timeline of history of environmentalism
- Brennilis Nuclear Power Plant
- Plogoff

== Bibliography ==
- Borvon, Gérard (2004). Plogoff: un combat pour demain. Cloître. ISBN 978-2-35002-001-3.
- Conan, Renée; Laurent, Annie. Femmes de Plogoff. Quimperlé: La Digitale. ISBN 978-2-903383-05-3.
- Keraron, Marc. Réactions nucléaires sur Plogoff. Rennes.
- Kernalegenn, Tudi (2006). Luttes écologistes dans le Finistère (1967-1981). Les chemins bretons de l'écologie. Fouesnant: Yoran Embanner.
- Le Diouron, T.; Cabon, André; de Lignières, G. (1980). Plogoff-la-révolte. Le Signor.
- Pichavant, René (1980). Les pierres de la liberté: Plogoff, 1975-1980. Morgane.
- Simon, Gilles (2010). L'apprentissage de la mobilisation sociale. Rennes: PUR.
- Horellou, Alexis; Le Lay, Delphine (2013). Plogoff. Delcourt. ISBN 978-2-7560-3151-4.7

== Documentaries ==
- 1980: Plogoff, des pierres contre des fusils, Nicole Le Garrec (France, 112 minutes), theatrical feature documentary. The restored film has been selected for the 2019 Cannes Film Festival (Cannes Classics).
- 1980: Le Dossier Plogoff, François Jacquemain (France, 50 minutes), restored in 2018 by Synaps.
- 2000: L'affaire Plogoff (France, 52 minutes), Brigitte Chevet.
- 2018: Plogoff mon amour, mémoire d'une lutte, Dominique Agniel (France, 60 minutes).
- 2021: Plogoff, les révoltés du nucléaire, François Reinhardt (France, 55 minutes).
