= Refuge des Écrins =

Coordinates: 44°56′50″N 6°22′59″E

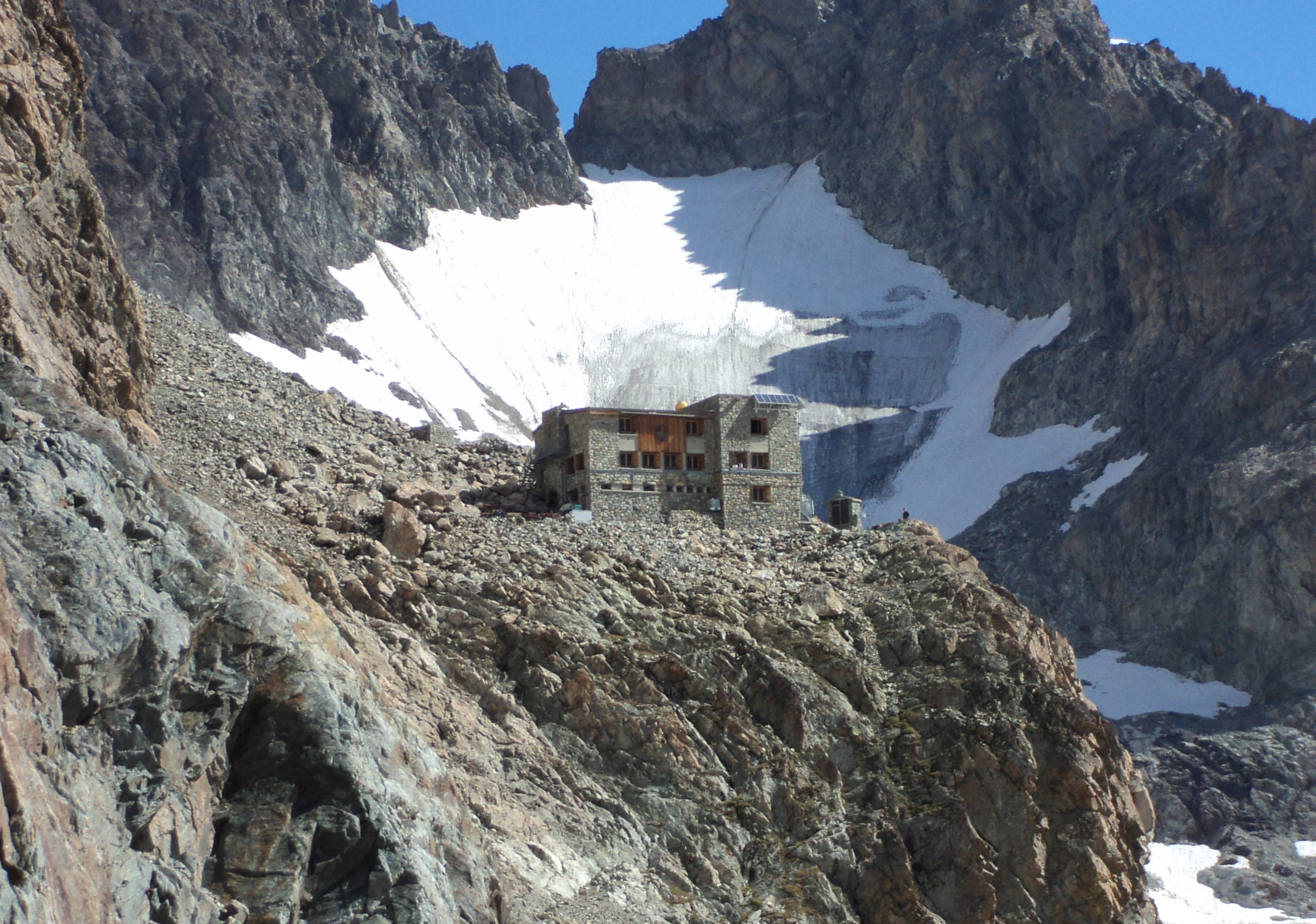
Refuge des Écrins

The Refuge des Écrins also known as Refuge Caron, or Refuge Ernest Caron, is a refuge in the Alps, in the French department of Hautes-Alpes, roughly 28 kilometres from Briançon. It stands at 3170 metres high, above the Glacier Blanc. Access is usually from the village of Ailefroide in the French Alps and a 2-hour hike further than the Refuge du Glacier Blanc.

The hut trail runs for the most part immediately above the glacier and should only be attempted by fully equipped high-altitude alpinists because of the danger of falling into a crevasse. The high alpine base with 119 beds is often overbooked during the peak season.

== History ==
The first iteration of the Caron shelter in the Massif des Ecrins was built in 1903, between the Emile Pic and Roche Faurio. The refuge was named after Ernest Caron (1840–1919) who, from 1898 to 1901, was president of the regional Briançon section of the Club Alpin Français or CAF, and from 1904 to 1907 the 10th president of the national CAF, now known as the Fédération Française des clubs alpins et de montagne or FFCAM.

The Cime de Caron, Col de Caron and Lac de la Cime Caron, in the Three Valleys of the Vanoise Massif range, are also named after Ernest Adolphe Caron.

During his time as treasurer and president of the Club Alpin Francais, Caron was particularly intent on increasing the number of women members. He is quoted in the French scientific reference library, Cairn.info, in 1898 saying; Many people imagine that to enter our association, one must take high-level or dangerous courses and tests. You know it's nothing of the kind. Membership is open to all those men and women who love the mountains, even from a distance. (translated from Caron, E. (1889). Chronique du club. Annuaire du CAF. 465–471).

Ernest Adolphe Caron was a lawyer and a politician, was President of the Conseil Municipal de Paris in 1909, and served as a councillor of the 2nd arrondissement (Vivienne) district of Paris on the Municipal Council of Paris for 25 years from 1890.

Caron was also president of the association of licensed attorneys at the Tribunal de commerce de Paris, at the time titled La Compagnie des Avocats Agrées au Tribunal de Commerce de la Seine" (Licensed Attorneys to the Commercial Court of Paris) from 1878 until his death, and a city councillor of the 2e arrondissement of Paris (Quartier Vivienne) from 1890 to 1919. Caron was closely involved with the building of the Rue Réaumur (2e), which became a symbol of the new architecture of the day, and a member of the Jury of the Concours de façades de la ville de Paris, which evolved from the rue Réaumur architectural revolution.

Caron was noted for his rousing speeches to the Paris Assembly during the devastating 1910 Great Flood of Paris known as La Crue de la Seine 1910, and was made Chevalier of the French Legion of Honour in 1889, and Officer of the Legion of Honour in 1897.

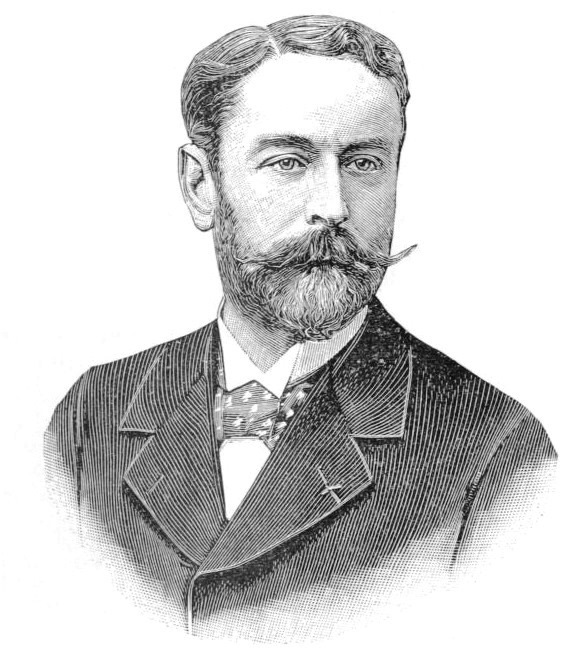
Ernest Adolphe Caron in 1895

The first 'Guardien' of the Refuge Caron was a local guide named Milou Cortial. The materials to build it were carried up by seven guides and six porters, earning 30 francs for every 100 kilos carried from L’Argentière-la-Bessée, to the construction place at an altitude of 3170 meters.

The first refuge, a wooden cabin, was destroyed by fire in 1921. In 1922 a larger wooden hut was built by the local firm Chalets Bayrou, which still exists today, and who exhibited the Refuge in the town of Briançon before constructing it on site. The second Refuge Caron had 36 beds, but often accommodated 70. In 1969 the refuge was enlarged to sleep 116 and renamed Refuge des Ecrins. A painting of the Refuge Caron by fr:Charles-Henri Contencin (1898–1955) titled The Refuge Caron (or Ecrins) above the Glacier Blanc, Dauphiné Alps, France, shows the wooden hut perched in a spectacular setting, precariously situated above the Glacier Blanc at over 3,000 metres. Contencin was an active member of the Paris-based Society of Mountain Painters which was founded in 1898, and eventually its president. His paintings were often displayed in regional and national exhibitions and more recently by licensed online image dealers.
