= Top station =

A top station or upper station is usually the highest station of an aerial lift, a funicular, a T-bar lift or a rack railway. The lowest station is the valley station. Passengers or skiers usually alight at the top station.

Top stations on a cable car may be ordinary buildings with a docking bay or open steel structures. Gondola lifts have horizontally arranged top stations. The top stations on chair lifts may have a simple jump-off point or a more substantial design.

== Gallery ==
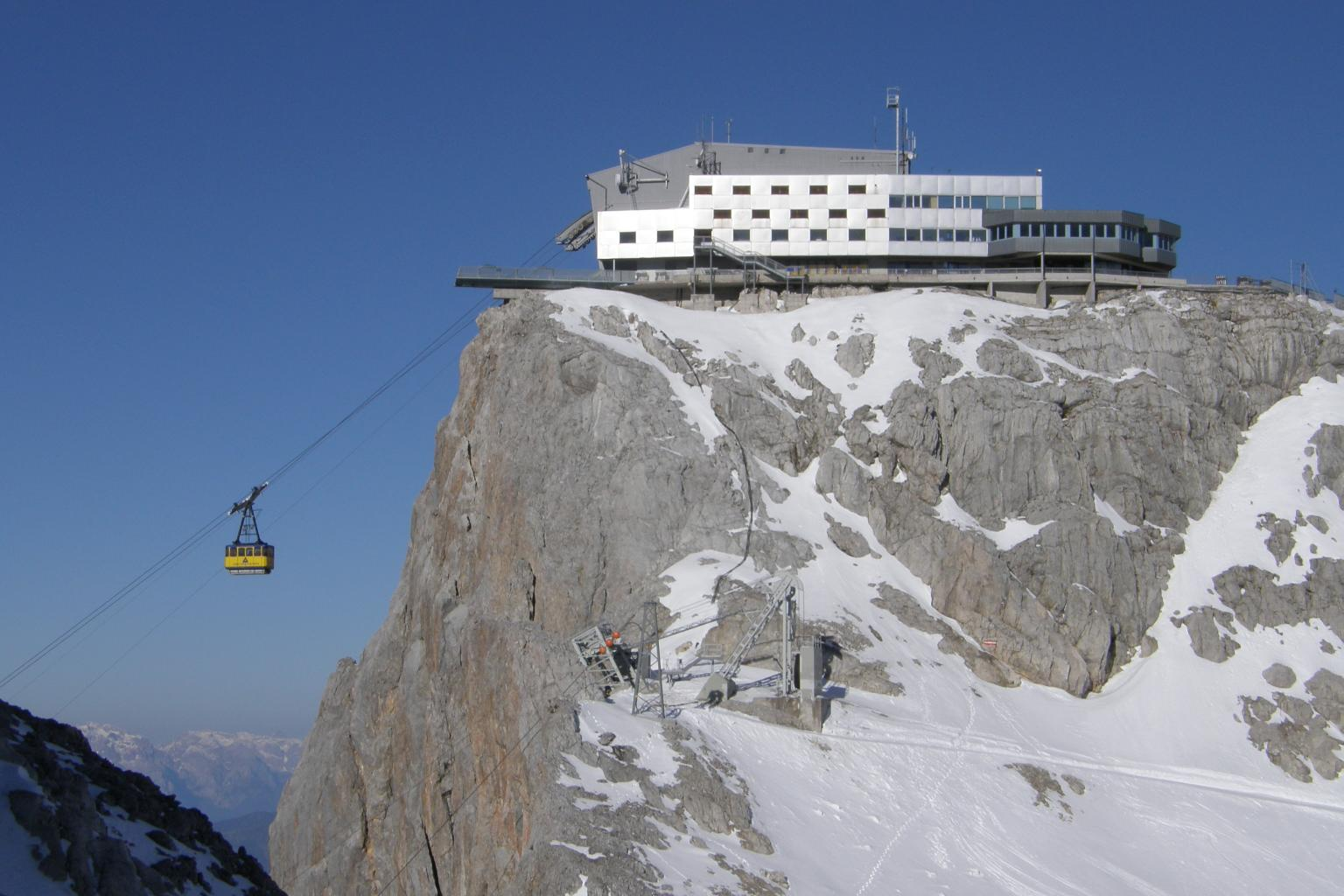
Dachstein cable car, Austria

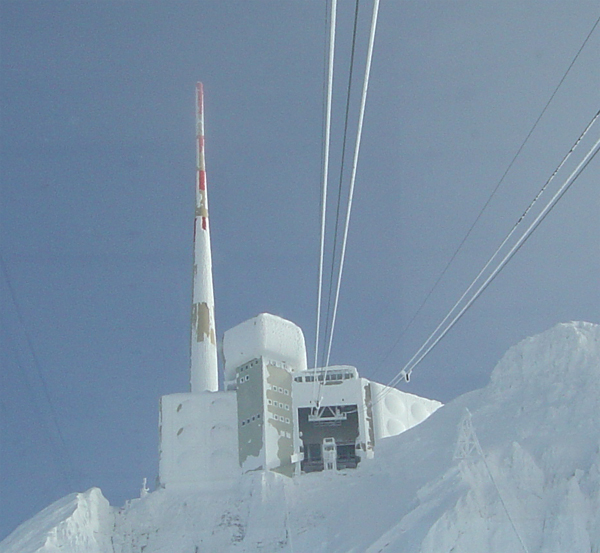
The Saentisbahn, Switzerland

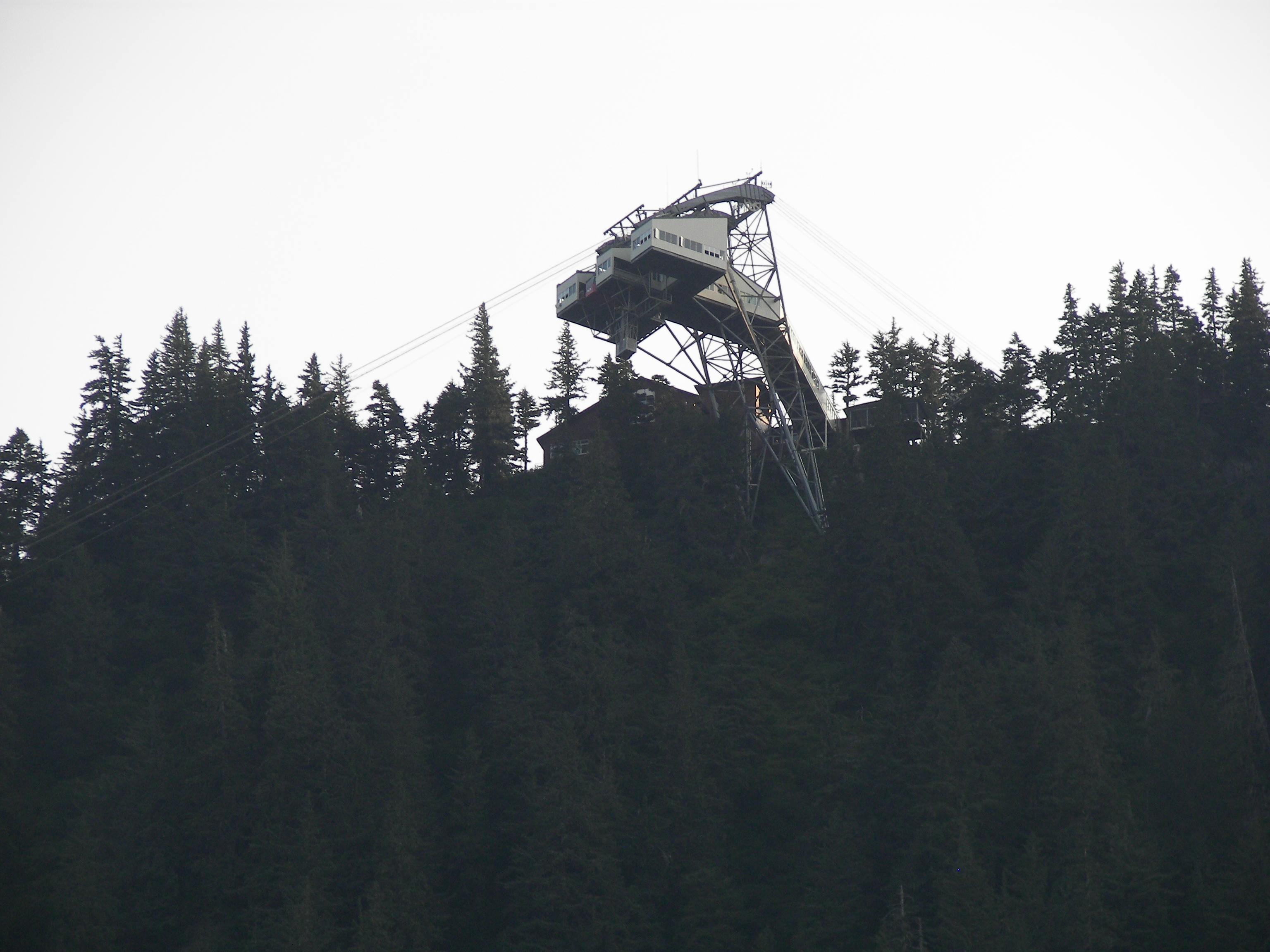
Mount Roberts Tramway, Juneau, Alaska

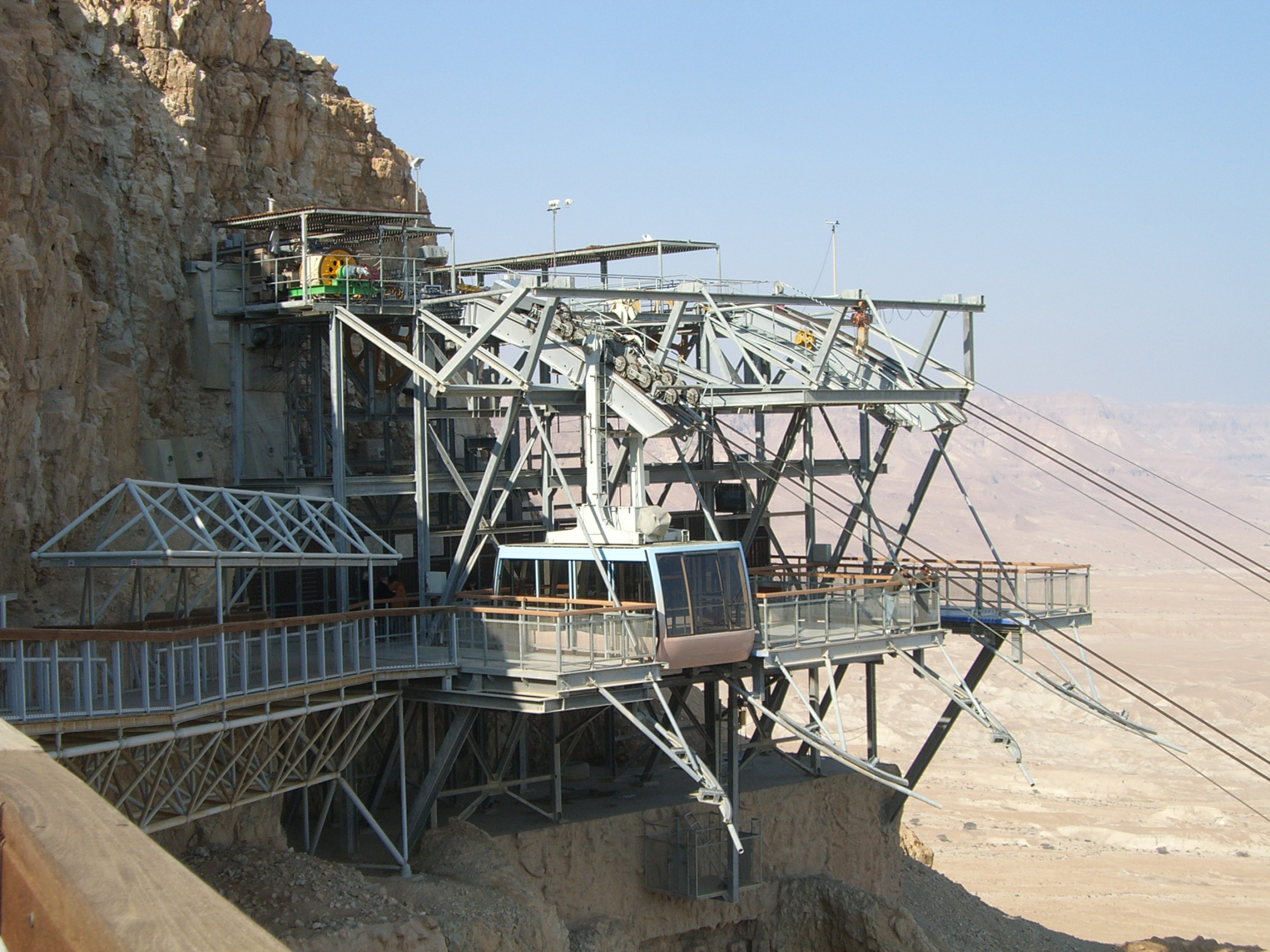
Masada cableway, Israel

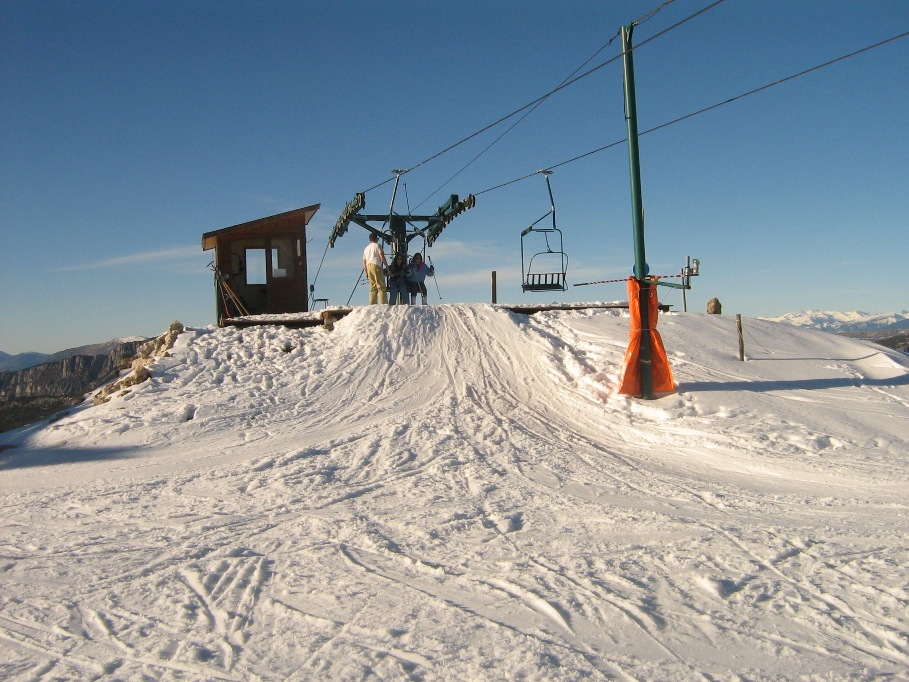
Top station of a simple chair lift

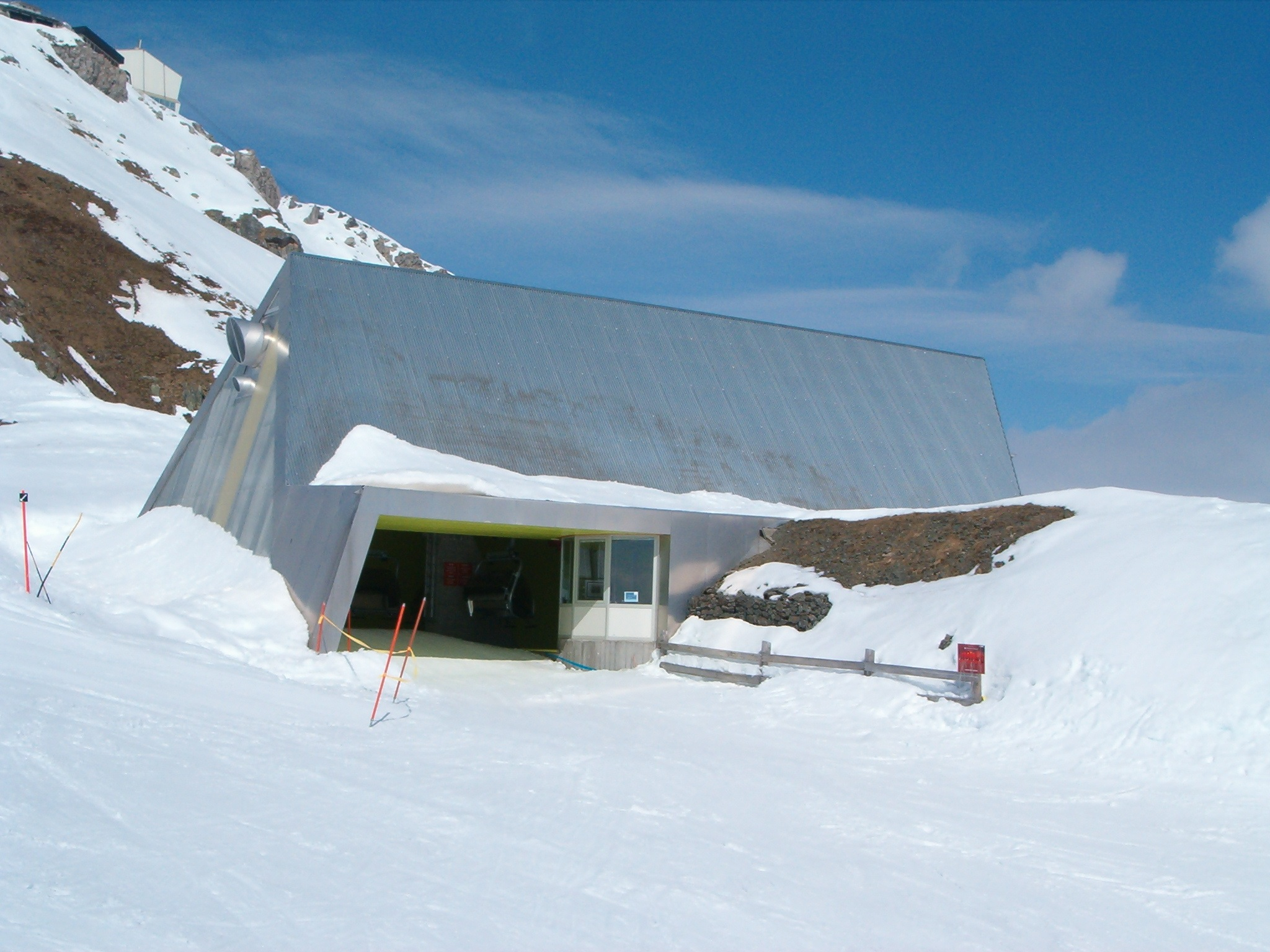
Top station of the Carmenna Chairlift, Arosa

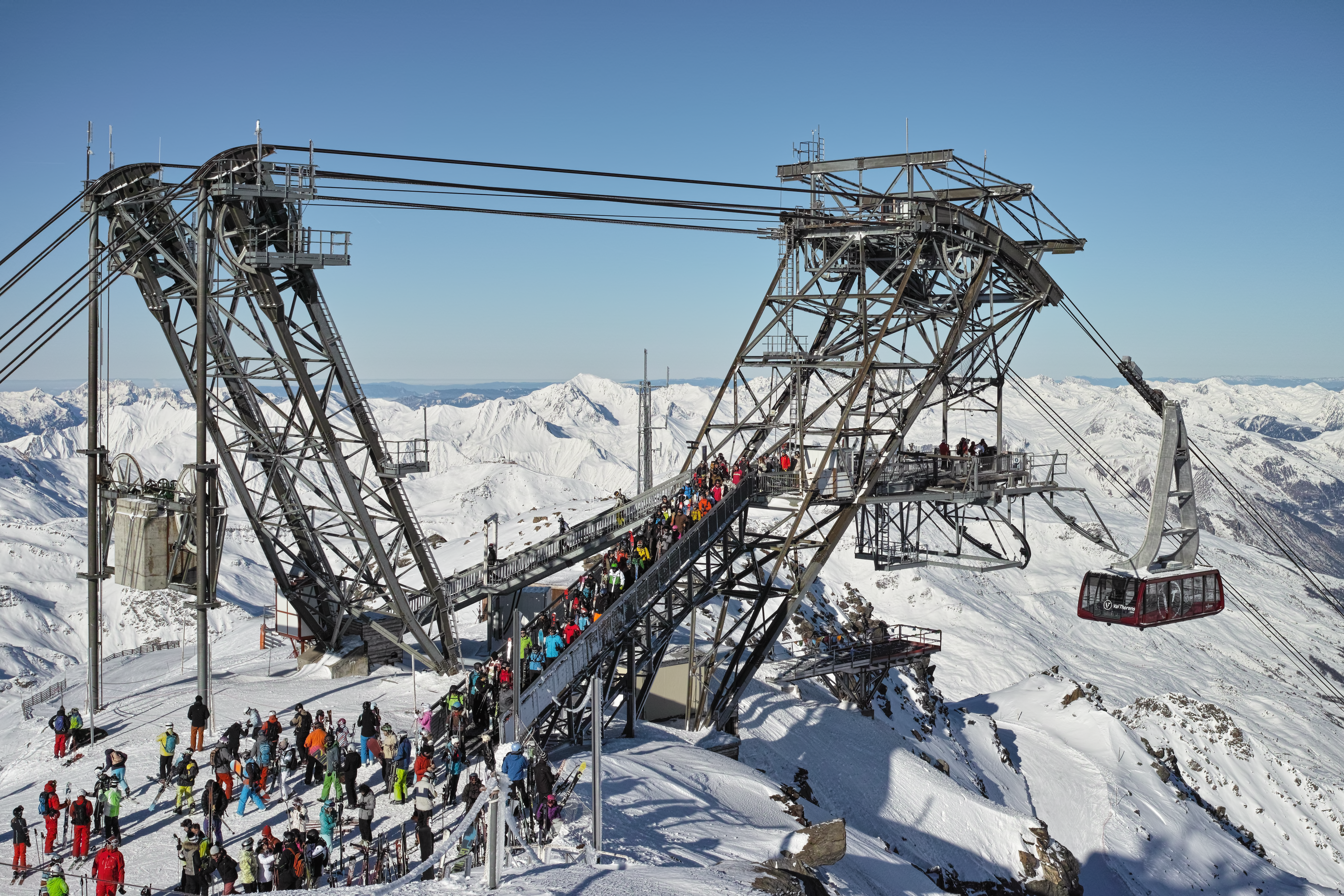
Top station on Cime de Caron, France
