= Montézic =

Commune in Occitanie, France

- Commune
- Coat of arms
- Location of Montézic
- Location within France Location within Occitanie
- Coordinates: 44°43′N 2°38′E
- Country: France
- Region: Occitania
- Department: Aveyron
- Arrondissement: Rodez
- Canton: Aubrac et Carladez

Government
  - Mayor (2020–2026): Pauline Cestrieres
- Area^{1}: 18.87 km^{2} (7.29 sq mi)
- Elevation: 630 m (2,070 ft)
- Highest elevation: 773 m (2,536 ft)
- Lowest elevation: 284 m (932 ft)
- Population (2023): 226
  - Density: 12.0/km^{2} (31.0/sq mi)
- Time zone: UTC+01:00 (CET)
  - Summer (DST): UTC+02:00 (CEST)
- INSEE/Postal code: 12151 /12460
- ^{1} French Land Register data, which excludes lakes, ponds, glaciers > 1 km^{2} (0.386 sq mi or 247 acres) and river estuaries.

Montézic (French pronunciation: [mɔ̃tezik]; Occitan: Montasic) is a commune in the Aveyron department in southern France.

The Montézic Power Station, a pumped-storage hydroelectricity plant, is located near the commune.

Charles de Louvrié, inventor of the jet engine, was born in the commune.

== Population ==
Historical population
Year	Pop.	±% p.a.
1968	238	—
1975	240	+0.12%
1982	297	+3.09%
1990	226	−3.36%
1999	240	+0.67%
2007	250	+0.51%
2012	258	+0.63%
2017	226	−2.61%
2023	226	+0.00%
Source: INSEE

== See also ==
- Communes of the Aveyron department
