= Cordemais Power Station =

Thermal power station in France

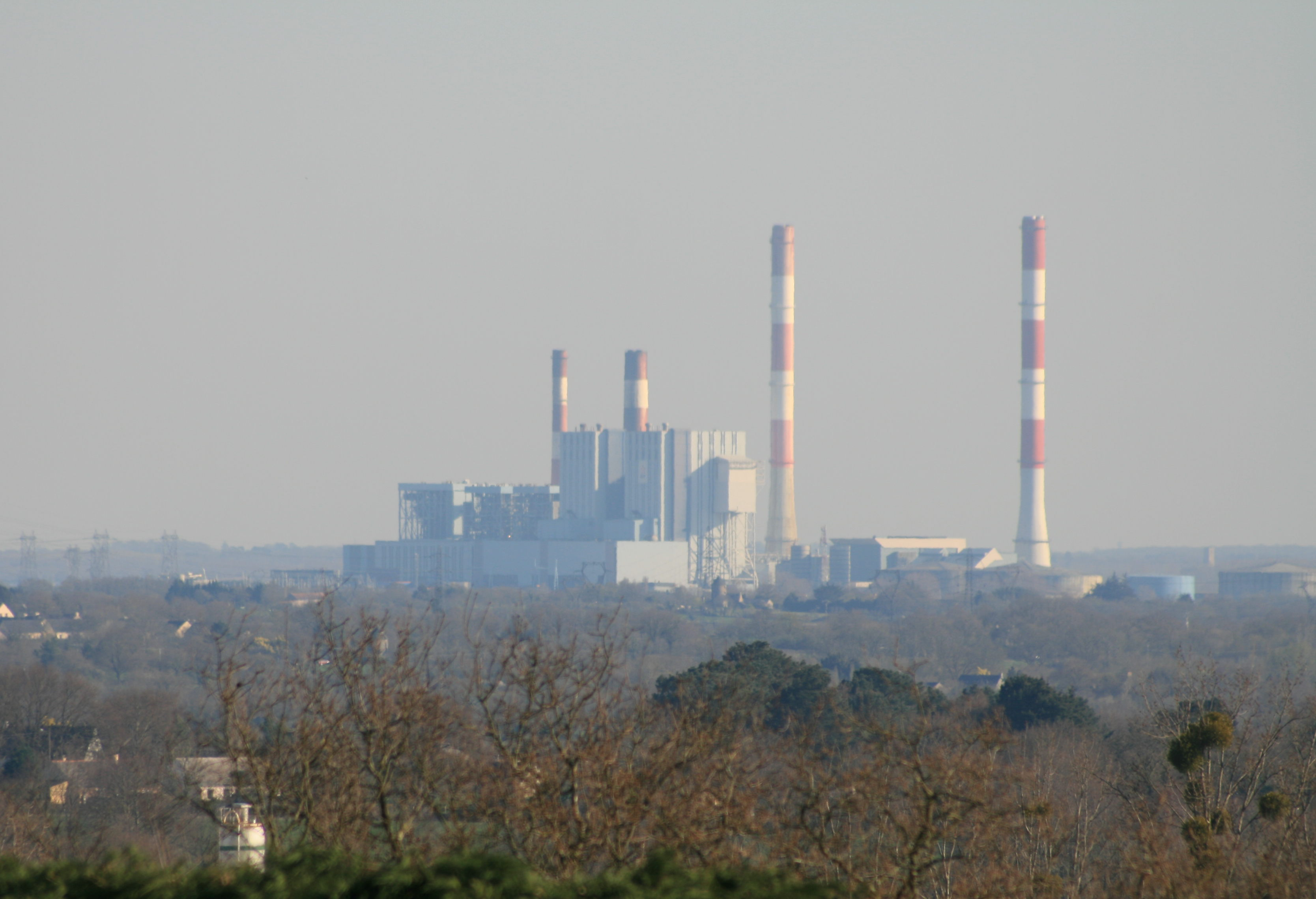
- Country: France
- Location: Cordemais
- Coordinates: 47°16′48″N 1°52′48″W
- Status: Operational
- Commission date: 1970
- Owner: Électricité de France
- Operator: Électricité de France

Thermal power station
- Primary fuel: Coal

Power generation
- Units operational: 2
- Units decommissioned: 3
- Nameplate capacity: 1,200 MW
- Capacity factor: 16%
- Annual net output: 1.693 TWh (2022)

External links
- Website: www.edf.fr/centrale-thermique-cordemais
- Commons: Related media on Commons

The Cordemais Power Station is a thermal power station in France. It has two coal-fired units with a capacity of 600 MW each. It previously had three oil-fired units; a 585 MW generating unit that was decommissioned in 1996 and two 700 MW generating unit decommissioned in 2017 and 2018

The station is in the western part of France at Cordemais in the department of Loire-Atlantique, Pays de la Loire. With an annual electricity production of 1.69 TWh in 2022 it is an important source of electricity supply for Brittany represents 6% of the electricity production of the region.

It has four chimneys, two of which at 220 m (720 ft), are some of the tallest structures in France. It is fully owned by the French energy giant Électricité de France.

The station consumes between 1.3 and 2 million tonnes of coal per year. The coal, imported from South Africa, Poland, the United States and Australia, arrives at port facilities at Montoir-de-Bretagne and is conveyed to the power station by barge.

== History ==
The Cordemais power station was commissioned in 1970 with a single oil-fired generating unit with a nameplate capacity of 585 MW. It was extended in 1976 with another two oil-fired units of 700 MW each, and in 1983 with one coal-fired unit of 600 MW. Its last expansion, another 600 MW coal-fired unit, was added in 1984. The station then functioned at a capacity of 3,185 MW until 1996, when the 1970s-built unit was decommissioned. In 2017 then in 2018, the other two oil-fired groups were decommissioned, resulting in its current capacity of 1,200 MW.

== See also ==
- List of tallest structures in France
- List of power stations in France
