= Belleville-sur-Loire =

- Commune
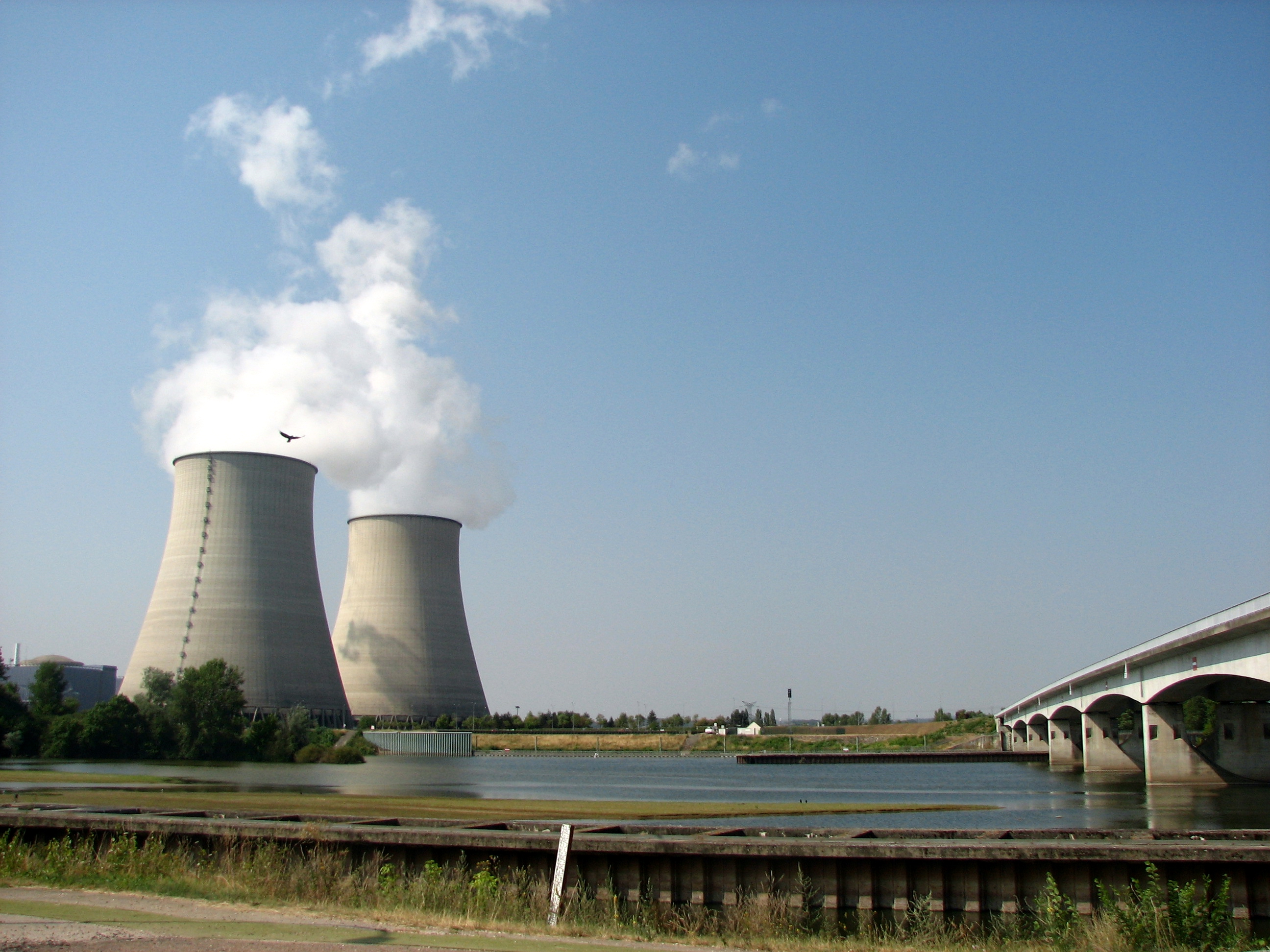
- The nuclear plant at Belleville

- Coat of arms
- Location of Belleville-sur-Loire
- Location within France Location within Centre-Val de Loire
- Coordinates: 47°30′22″N 2°51′05″E
- Country: France
- Region: Centre-Val de Loire
- Department: Cher
- Arrondissement: Bourges
- Canton: Sancerre
- Intercommunality: CC Pays Fort Sancerrois Val de Loire

Government
  - Mayor (2021–2026): Bruno Van Der Putten
- Area^{1}: 11 km^{2} (4.2 sq mi)
- Population (2023): 989
  - Density: 90/km^{2} (230/sq mi)
- Time zone: UTC+01:00 (CET)
  - Summer (DST): UTC+02:00 (CEST)
- INSEE/Postal code: 18026 /18240
- ^{1} French Land Register data, which excludes lakes, ponds, glaciers > 1 km^{2} (0.386 sq mi or 247 acres) and river estuaries.

Belleville-sur-Loire (French pronunciation: [bɛlvil syʁ lwaʁ], literally Belleville on Loire) is a commune in the Cher department in the Centre-Val de Loire region of France.

== Geography ==
A farming village with a nuclear power station situated by the banks of the river Loire, some 33 miles (53 km) northeast of Bourges at the junction of the D82, D951 and the D751 roads. The canal latéral à la Loire flows through the centre of the commune.

== Population ==
Historical population
Year	Pop.	±% p.a.
1968	352	—
1975	288	−2.83%
1982	448	+6.52%
1990	1,009	+10.68%
1999	1,088	+0.84%
2007	1,030	−0.68%
2012	1,029	−0.02%
2017	1,058	+0.56%
2023	989	−1.12%
Source: INSEE

== Sights ==
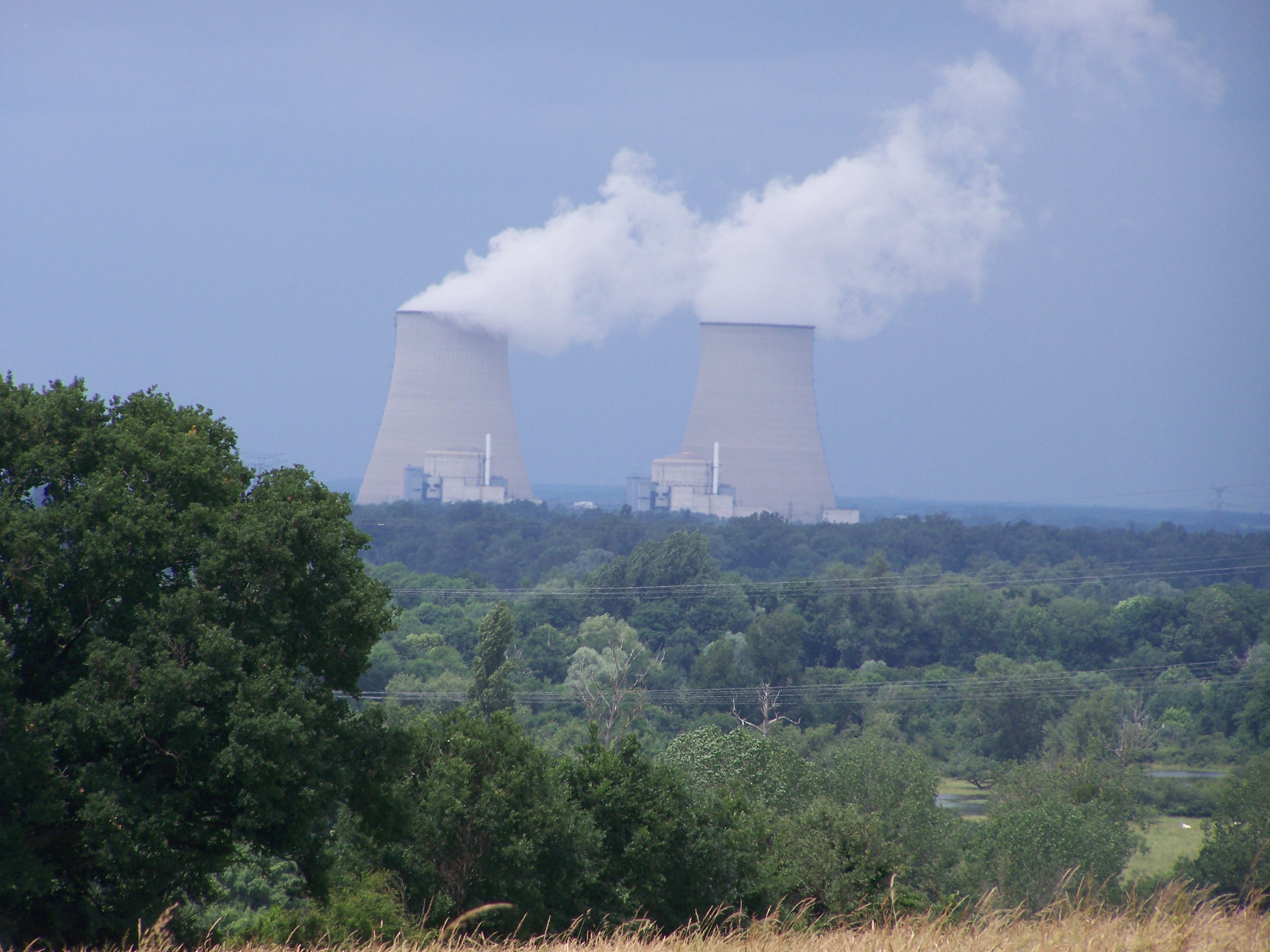
Nuclear power station

- The church, dating from the twelfth century.
- Two chateaux, dating from the 15th and seventeenth century.
- Vestiges of Roman occupation.
- The nuclear power plant.

== See also ==
- Belleville Nuclear Power Plant
- Communes of the Cher department
