= Montézic Power Station =

Montézic Hydroelectric Power Station
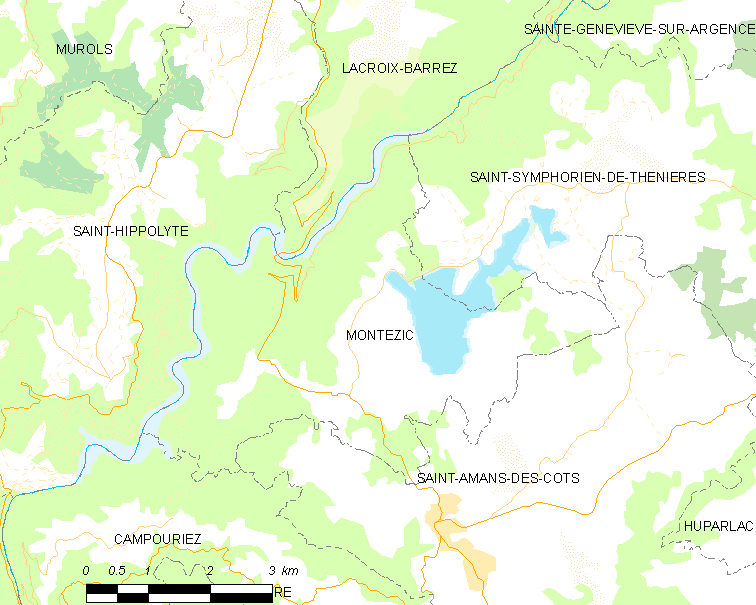
- Map showing the Montézic Reservoir.
- Interactive map of Montézic Hydroelectric Power Station
- Official name: Centrale hydroélectrique de Montézic
- Country: France
- Location: Montézic, Aveyron
- Coordinates: 44°44′16″N 2°38′35″E
- Status: Operational
- Construction began: 1976
- Opening date: 1982
- Operator: EDF

Upper reservoir
- Creates: Montézic Reservoir
- Total capacity: 30,000,000 m^{3} (24,000 acre⋅ft)

Lower reservoir
- Creates: Couesques Reservoir
- Total capacity: 56,000,000 m^{3} (45,000 acre⋅ft)

Power Station
- Hydraulic head: 423 m (1,388 ft)
- Pump-generators: 4 reversible Francis turbines
- Installed capacity: 910 MW

The Montézic Power Station (French: Centrale de Montézic) is a pumped-storage power plant near the commune of Montézic in northern Aveyron, France. Its 910-megawatt capacity ranks it second among France's main pumped-storage facilities, and is the only one situated on the Massif Central.

Montézic is a pure pumped-storage plant, which means that its upstream reservoir receives little to no natural inflow of water. The station has a weekly time cycle.

== History ==
The construction of the power station started in 1976, and it was commissioned in 1982. The following are some key dates from this period:

In August 1976, the power station's access tunnel was bored, and between November 1977 and July 1978, grading work for the plant, the connecting tunnels, and the dams was carried out. In July 1979, assembly of the turbine generators took place.

In May 1981, the Etang Dam (Barrage de l'Etang) was completed, and from June to August, the upper reservoir was filled.

- October 1981: Completion of the Monnès Dam (Barrage de Monnès).
- January 1982: Filling of the penstock tunnels.
- April 1982: Commissioning of turbine assembly 1
- June 1982: Commissioning of turbine assembly 2
- October 1982: Commissioning of turbine assembly 3
- December 1982: Commissioning of turbine assembly 4

== Operation ==
The power station was built by the electric utility company Électricité de France (EDF, Electricity of France), which operates it under a concession agreement.

== Reservoirs ==
The power station receives water from an upper basin, the Montézic Reservoir, whose active capacity is 30,000,000 cubic meters (24,000 acre-feet). Two rock-fill embankment dams form the reservoir:

- the Monnès Dam, 820 meters (2,690 feet) long and 57 m (187 ft) high
- the Etang Dam, 680 m (2,230 ft) long and 30 m (98 ft) high

Under normal conditions, the Montézic Reservoir sits at a 703 m (2,306 ft) elevation and covers a surface area of 245 hectares (0.95 square miles).

Due to the fluctuating water level, the reservoir is unsuitable for leisure activities. In order to remedy this problem, EDF created the Saint Gervais Lake (Lac de Saint Gervais) through the installment of another embankment, providing a stable body of water for the promotion of aquatic tourism.

The lower basin was already in existence as a result of the Couesques Dam, a 70-meter-tall (230 ft) arch dam on the Truyère River built between 1945 and 1950. This reservoir holds a volume of 56,000,000 m^{3} (45,000 acre⋅ft).

The Montézic power station utilizes a water volume of 30,000,000 m^{3} (24,000 acre⋅ft). If the four turbine generator assemblies are in pump mode, the Couesques Reservoir can be emptied in 40 hours. Both the turbine and pump modes are used on a regular basis.

== Penstocks ==
The penstocks are 5.3 m (17 ft) in diameter and 630 m (2,070 ft) in length. They carry water from the upper reservoir to the power station through the high-pressure tunnel. The water intake, located on the Liaussac Embankment (next to the Monnès Dam), has two sluice gates, which allow the high-pressure tunnel to be closed off. Once the water has passed through the turbines, it is evacuated through the 541-meter-long (1,775 ft) low-pressure tunnel towards the Couesques Reservoir.

== Power station ==
The Montézic station lies 400 m (1,300 ft) under the earth, dug out of granite. It has all of the electrical and hydraulic equipment necessary for the operation of its four turbine-pump assemblies, which are each capable of generating 230 MW in turbine mode and consuming 210 MW in pump mode, and permit the transfer of energy between the upper Montézic Reservoir and the lower Couesques Reservoir. The generator's 18 kV of power are raised to 400 kV by 250 MVA transformers and then sent on to the Ruyères Substation.

The 22 MW static frequency converter (SFC) is used to launch the turbines in pump mode. It performs a progressive increase in speed (from 0 to 428 rpm) as well as the coupling of the pumps to the power grid. Made up of an array of thyristors, the converter enables a gradual start-up by varying the frequency and thus the speed of the machines. When the synchronization speed is reached, the turbine-pump assembly can be coupled to the grid. The start-up phase is performed dry, with no load.

Each machine has a flow rate of 60 m^{3}/s (2,100 cu ft/s) in both directions. The pump-turbines are located 60 m (200 ft) below the maximum level of the Couesques Reservoir, which is 40 m (130 ft) below the minimum level. This placement is essential to prevent the cavitation in the intake tunnel.

As one of France's pumped storage facilities, known as STEP (Station de transfer d'énergie par pompage), Montézic plays a key role in the supply of the French power grid, as it provides a way to quickly restore electricity during a blackout.

== See also ==
- List of power stations in France
- Electricity sector in France
- Renewable energy in France
- List of largest hydroelectric power stations
- Hydropower
