= Brennilis Nuclear Power Plant =

Decommissioned nuclear power plant in France

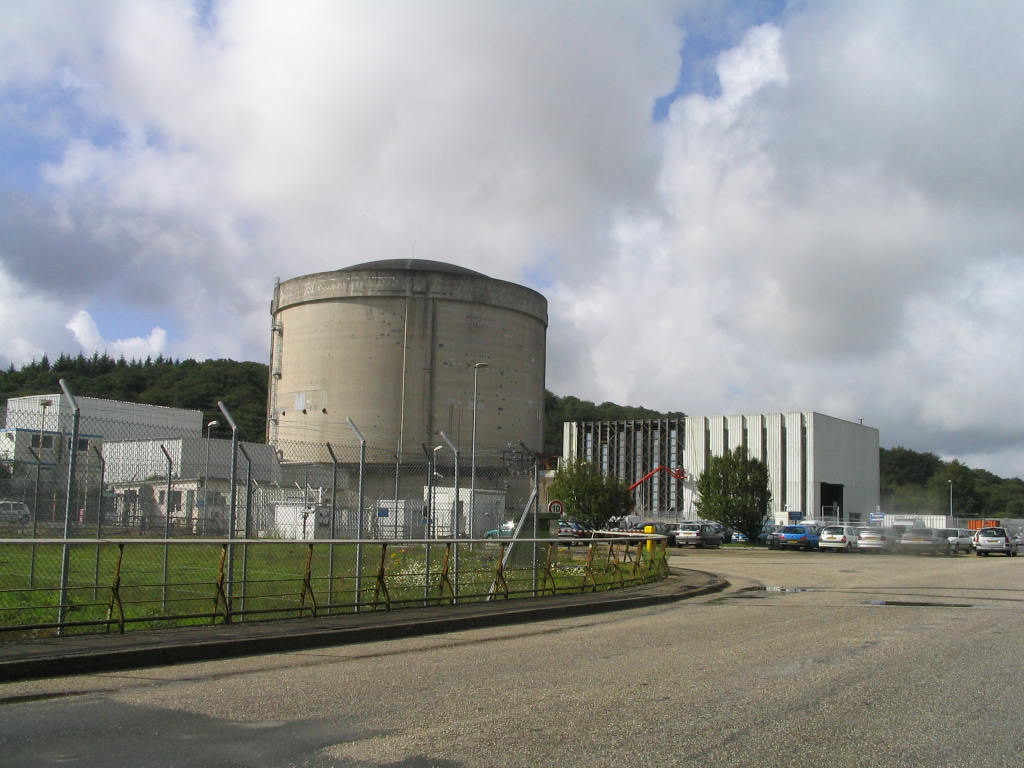
- Nuclear Power Plant Brennilis
- Official name: Centrale nucléaire de Brennilis
- Country: France
- Location: Monts d'Arrée, Brennilis
- Coordinates: 48°21′11.88″N 3°52′19.93″W
- Status: Decommissioned
- Construction began: 1962
- Commission date: July 9, 1967; 59 years ago
- Decommission date: July 31, 1985; 41 years ago
- Operators: CEA; EDF

Nuclear power station
- Reactor type: HWGCR

Power generation
- Units decommissioned: 1 x 70 MW
- Nameplate capacity: 70 MW

External links
- Commons: Related media on Commons

The Brennilis Nuclear Power Plant (EL-4) is a decommissioned site located in the Monts d'Arrée in the commune of Brennilis in Finistère, France.

== History ==
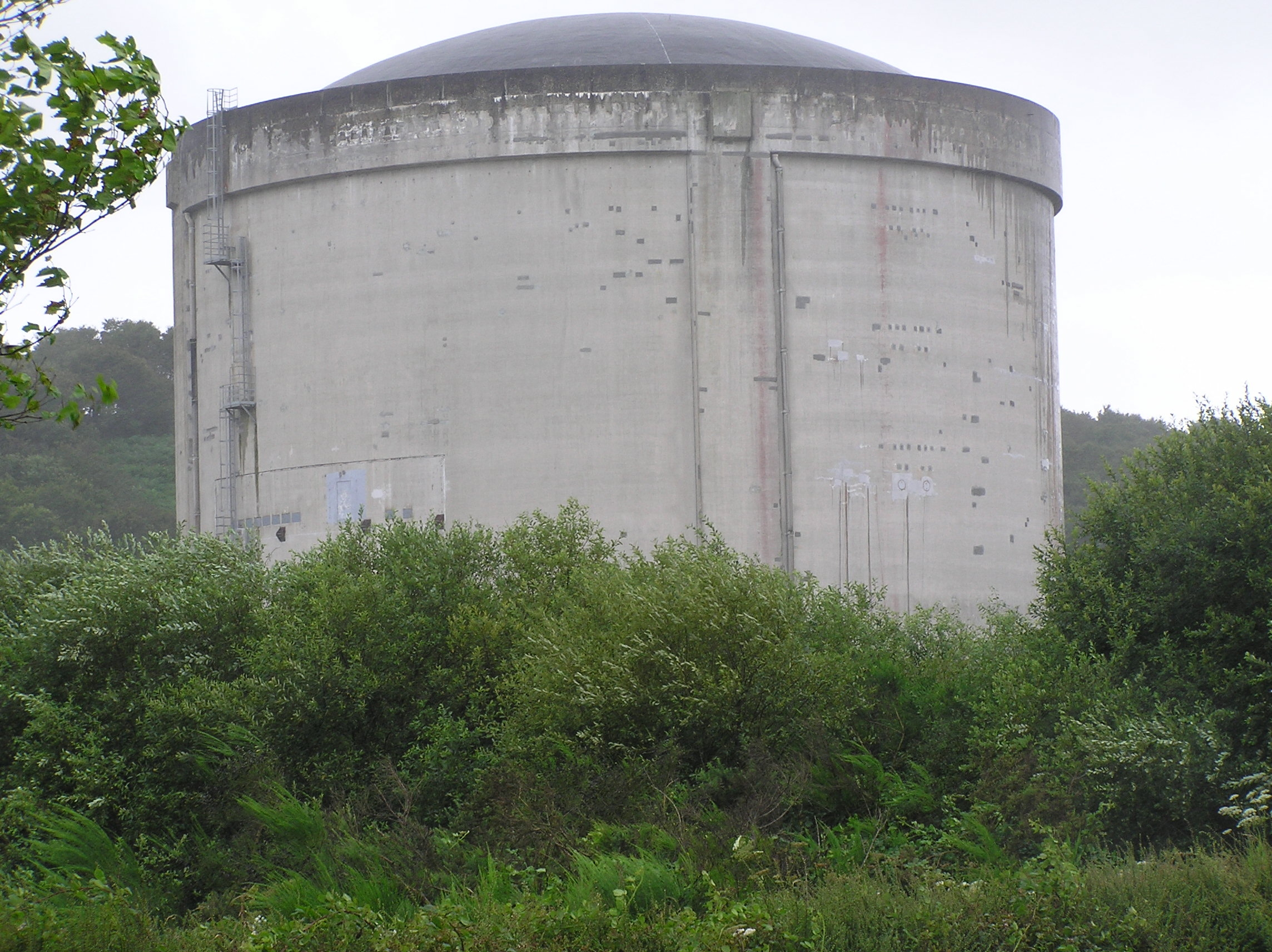
The reactor containment structure

The Commissariat à l'énergie atomique began construction of this experimental reactor moderated with heavy water and cooled with carbon dioxide (HWGCR) in 1962. The reactor had a planned output power of 70 MWe. The plant achieved criticality in December, 1966.

In 1971, however, the French government elected to use pressurized water reactor technology developed in the United States as their model design.

On August 15, 1975, two explosions slightly damaged a turbine and destroyed a telephone circuit. The Liberation Front of Brittany claimed responsibility. In 1979 the group destroyed electrical lines going from the plant to the grid, and with there being no grid to supply power to, the plant shut down. This was the only time in history that a terrorist group successfully stopped operation of a nuclear power plant.

In 1985 the reactor was shut down permanently. The cost of decommissioning is estimated to be €482 million, much greater than initial estimates.

== Decommissioning experience ==
This nuclear plant marks the first decommissioning of a complete nuclear power station in France. EDF and CEA announced their intention to make this a transparent process so that it can be used as a model for future decommissioning operations at other plants.

The process is divided into 3 stages.

=== Stage 1 ===
This stage began in 1985, and is similar to a refueling outage; the fuel is moved to the spent fuel pool, but new fuel is not loaded, and the fuel on site is eventually transported elsewhere. It consists of:

- final shut-down
- discharge of the nuclear fuel
- draining of cooling circuits

=== Stage 2 ===
In 1995, a public inquiry was held. In 1996, it was decided that a feasibility study for the "greening" of the site would be submitted by the end of 1999. Stage 2 began in 1997, consisting of:

- decontamination and disassembling of the buildings except for the reactor itself
- evacuation of the nuclear waste
- containment of the reactor pressure vessel

On December 13, 2000, a rise in the ground water level caused a flood in the chemical processing building. In January 2001, a fire broke out in the joint inner building. In 2005, stage 2 was officially complete.

=== Stage 3 ===
Stage 3 consists mostly of containing the reactor pressure vessel (RPV) and is underway. The full decommission is planned to be finally totally complete in year 2040.

- dismantling of the steam generators
- dismantling of the reactor pressure vessel
- demolition of the containment building

== See also ==
- Plogoff nuclear power plant project
