= Belleville Nuclear Power Plant =

Nuclear power plant in Belleville-sur-Loire, France

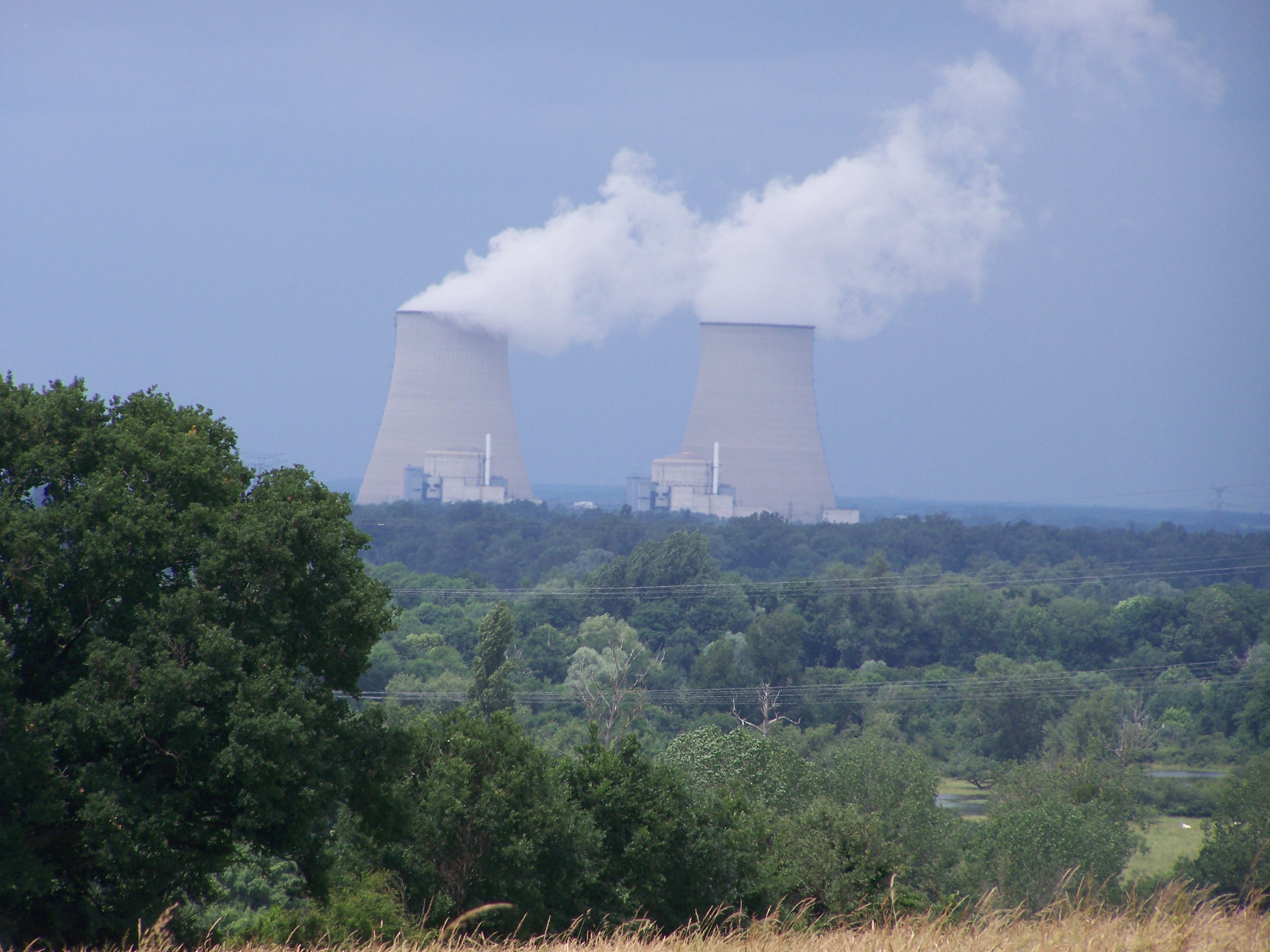
- The Belleville NPP
- Official name: Centrale Nucléaire de Belleville
- Country: France
- Location: Belleville-sur-Loire
- Coordinates: 47°30′35″N 2°52′30″E
- Status: Operational
- Construction began: Unit 1: 1 May 1980; Unit 2: 1 August 1980
- Commission date: Unit 1: 1 June 1988; 37 years ago Unit 2: 1 January 1989; 36 years ago
- Owner: Électricité de France
- Operator: EDF

Nuclear power station
- Reactor type: PWR
- Reactor supplier: Framatome
- Cooling towers: 2 × Natural Draft
- Cooling source: Loire River
- Thermal capacity: 2 × 3817 MW_{th}

Power generation
- Units operational: 2 × 1310 MW
- Make and model: P4 REP 1300
- Nameplate capacity: 2620 MW
- Capacity factor: 72.60%
- Annual net output: 16,662 GW·h (2016)

External links
- Website: www.edf.fr/centrale-nucleaire-belleville
- Commons: Related media on Commons

The Belleville Nuclear Power Plant is located in Belleville-sur-Loire (Cher) near Léré, along the river Loire between Nevers (75 kilometres (47 mi) upstream) and Orléans (100 kilometres (62 mi) downstream). It employs approximately 620 people and consists of two large 1,300 MW P4 nuclear reactors. Its cooling water comes from the Loire River.

== Key information ==
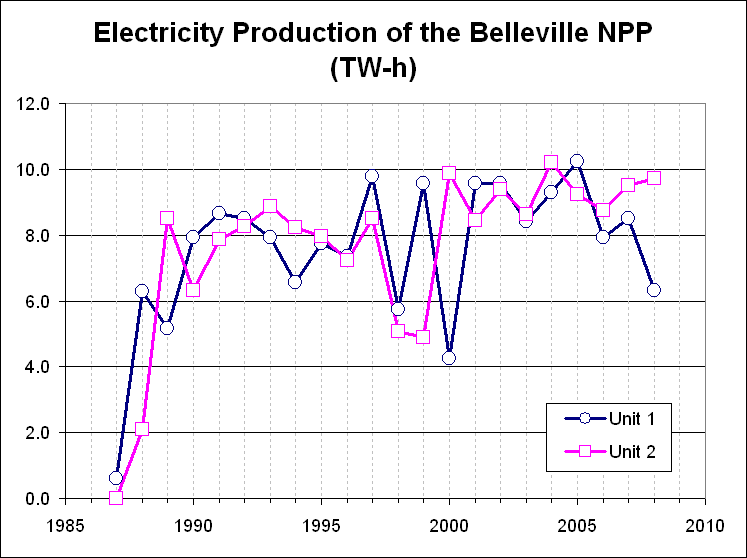
Plant performance

The site spans 170 hectares and is located on a flood-safe, 4.6-meter-high platform. Each year it produces an average of 19 billion kilowatt hours fed to the electricity grid, and thus covers about four percent of French electricity production.

With the construction of the first reactor was started on 1 May 1980, and it began operation 14 October 1987. The second unit started construction 1 August 1980 and began operation 6 July 1988. The shutdown of the reactors is planned for the years 2028 and 2029 for unit 1 and 2 respectively.

== Safety ==
In May 2001 construction-related defects were observed in this plant, along with four other sites.

The emergency cooling system of the two-phase nuclear power plant has a reserve water tank at the bottom of the reactor building. In the event of a defect in the primary cooling circuit that causes it to no longer contribute to cooling, the water from the reserve tank is automatically fed into the cooling system. Inspections in May 2001 showed, however, that this automatic feeding of the water was unreliable, because under some circumstances the pressure of the heated water may block the water slide.

The French nuclear regulatory authority ASN initially classified this disruption of the emergency cooling systems as stage 1 on the international scale of nuclear events (INES), but later assigned it the stage 2 classification. The operating company EDF then built the slider so that excess pressure can no longer lead to a blockage.

In 2017 the French nuclear regulator Autorité de sûreté nucléaire (ASN) placed Belleville under increased supervision because of "several failures by the operator in identifying and analysing the consequences of anomalies affecting certain safety-critical equipment". Belleville has had eight Level 1 events on the International Nuclear Event Scale.

On 2 December 2021, the International Atomic Energy Agency (IAEA)'s Operational Safety Review Team (OSART), concluded an 18-day mission to Belleville and concluded the plant's operators had demonstrated a commitment to safety by introducing additional methods to prepare for accident management and using innovative approaches in the training of plant staff. OSART also identified areas for further enhancement, for example in operation, maintenance and operating experience. The mission was carried out at the request of the Government of France.

== Reactor characteristics ==
Reactor name	Model	Capacity [MW]			Operator	Constructor	Start of construction	Grid connection	Commercial operation
Reactor name	Model	Thermal (MWt)	Gross (MWe)	Net (MWe)	Operator	Constructor	Start of construction	Grid connection	Commercial operation
Belleville-1	P'4 REP 1300	3,817	1,363	1,310	EDF	Framatome	May 1980	October 1987	June 1988
Belleville-2	P'4 REP 1300	3,817	1,363	1,310	EDF	Framatome	August 1980	July 1988	January 1989

== Gallery ==
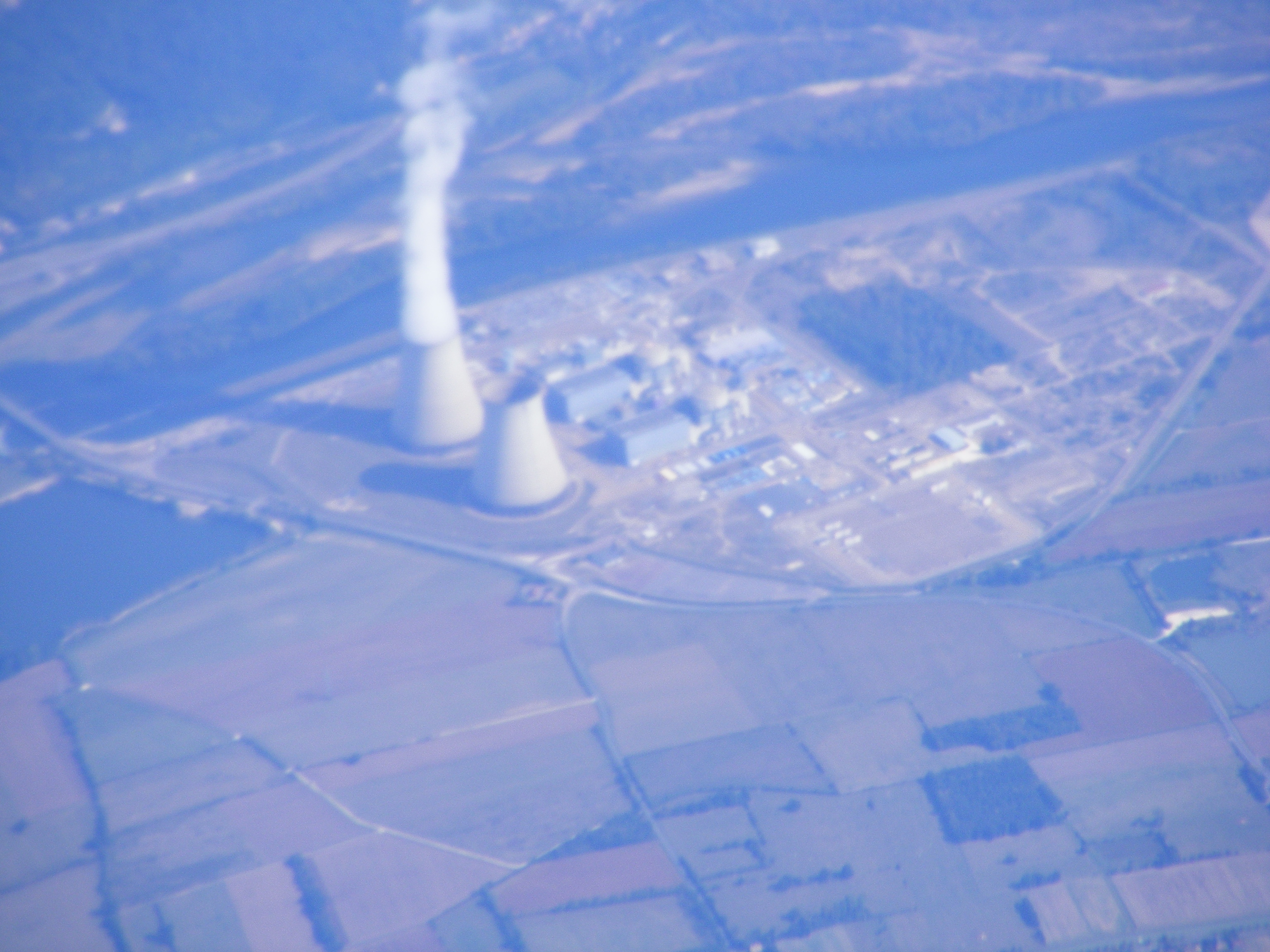
Aerial view of the plant.

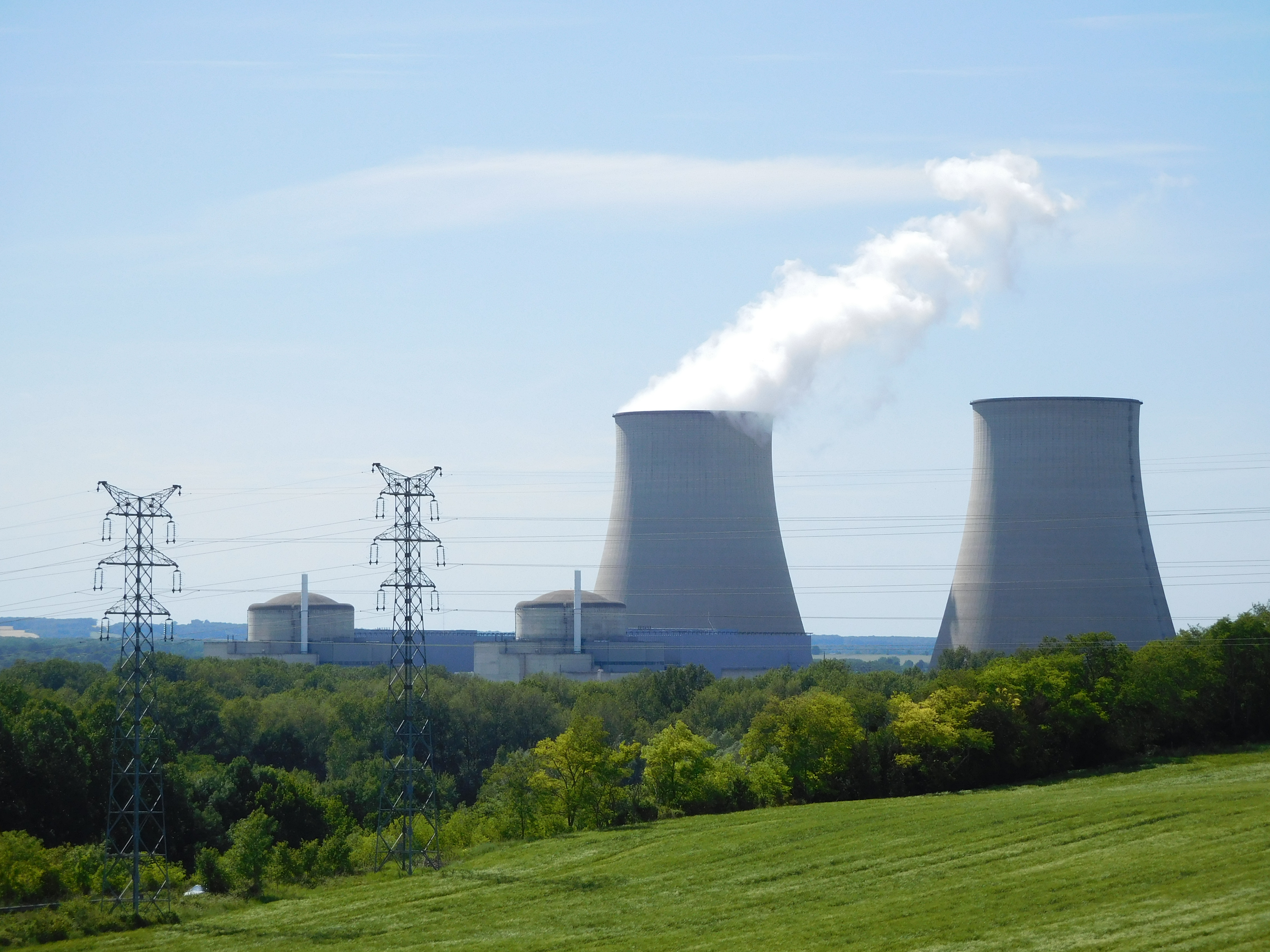
From the right bank of the Loire, upstream.

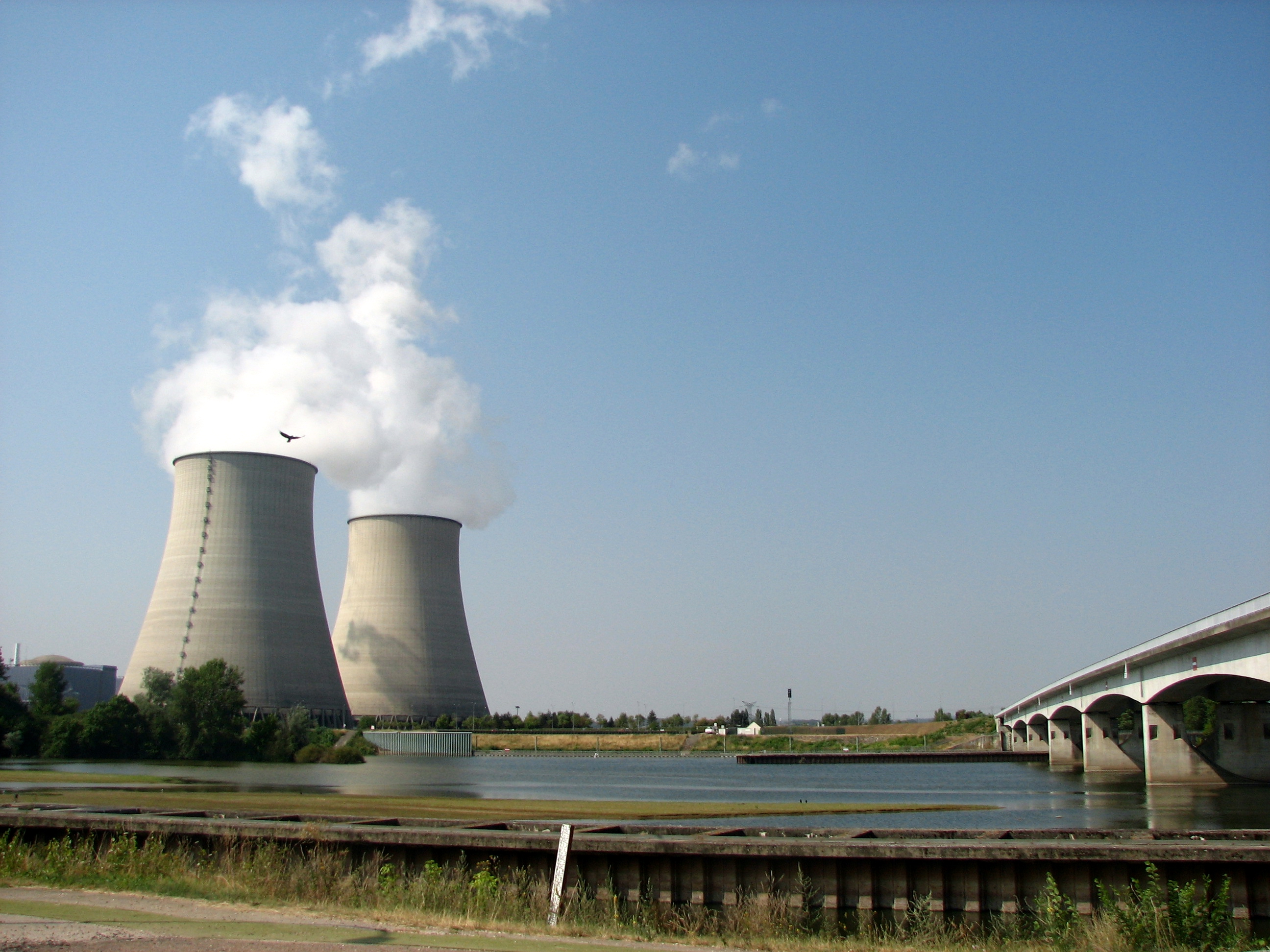
From the right bank of the Loire, downstream.

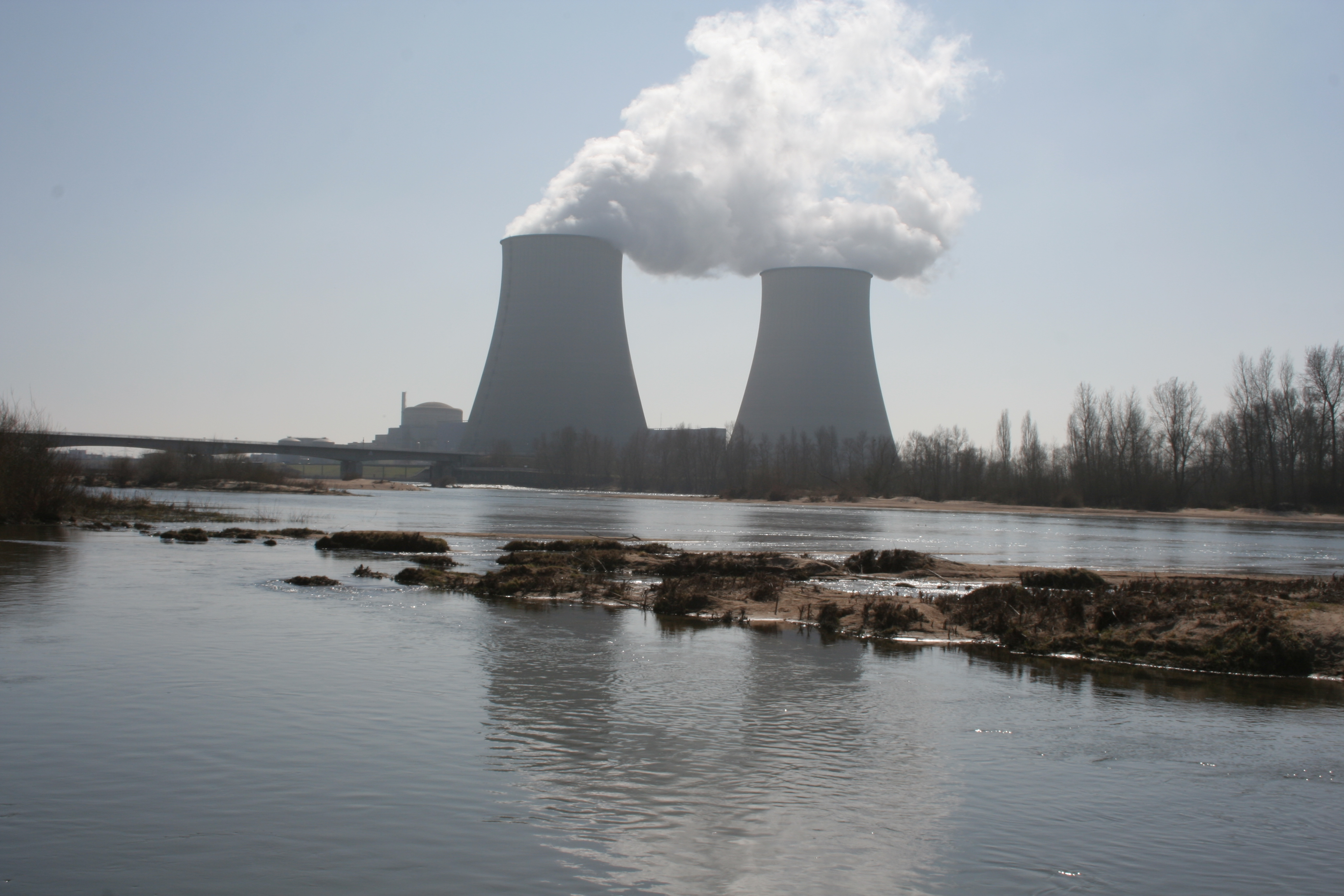
From the right bank of the Loire, downstream.

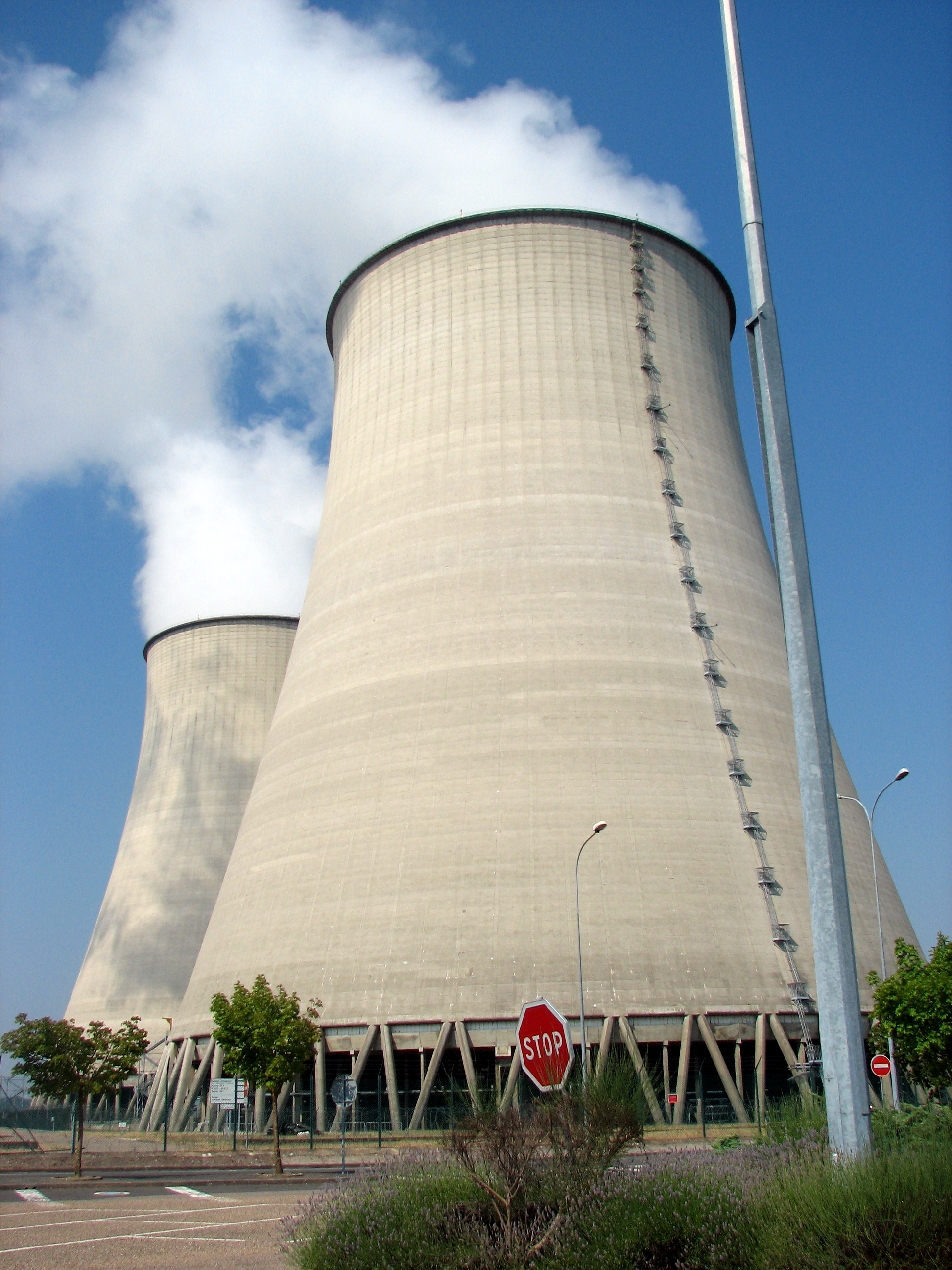
The two cooling towers.

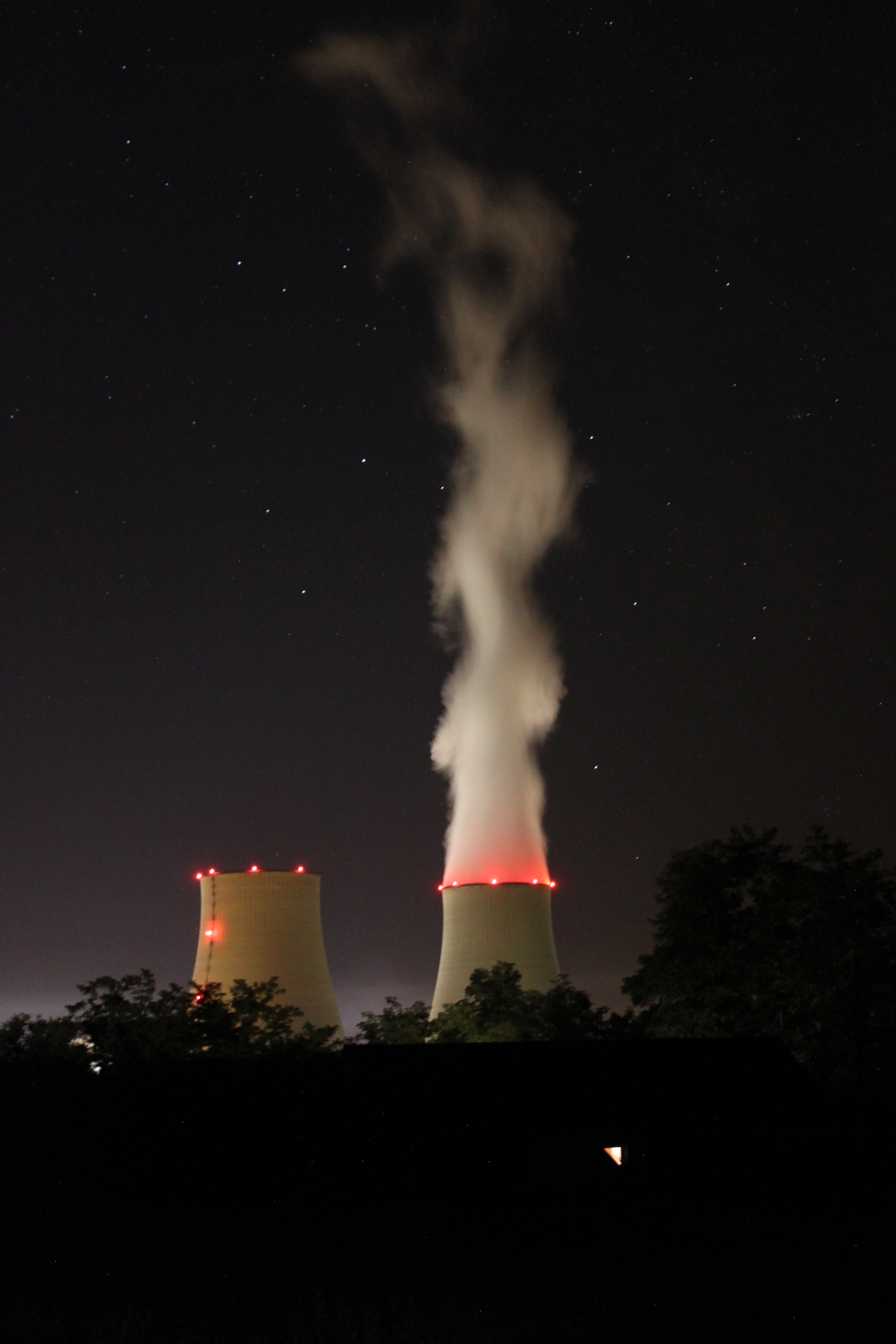
Night view of the cooling tower
