= Cordemais =

Cordemais Cordemaè (Gallo) Kordevez (Breton)
- Commune
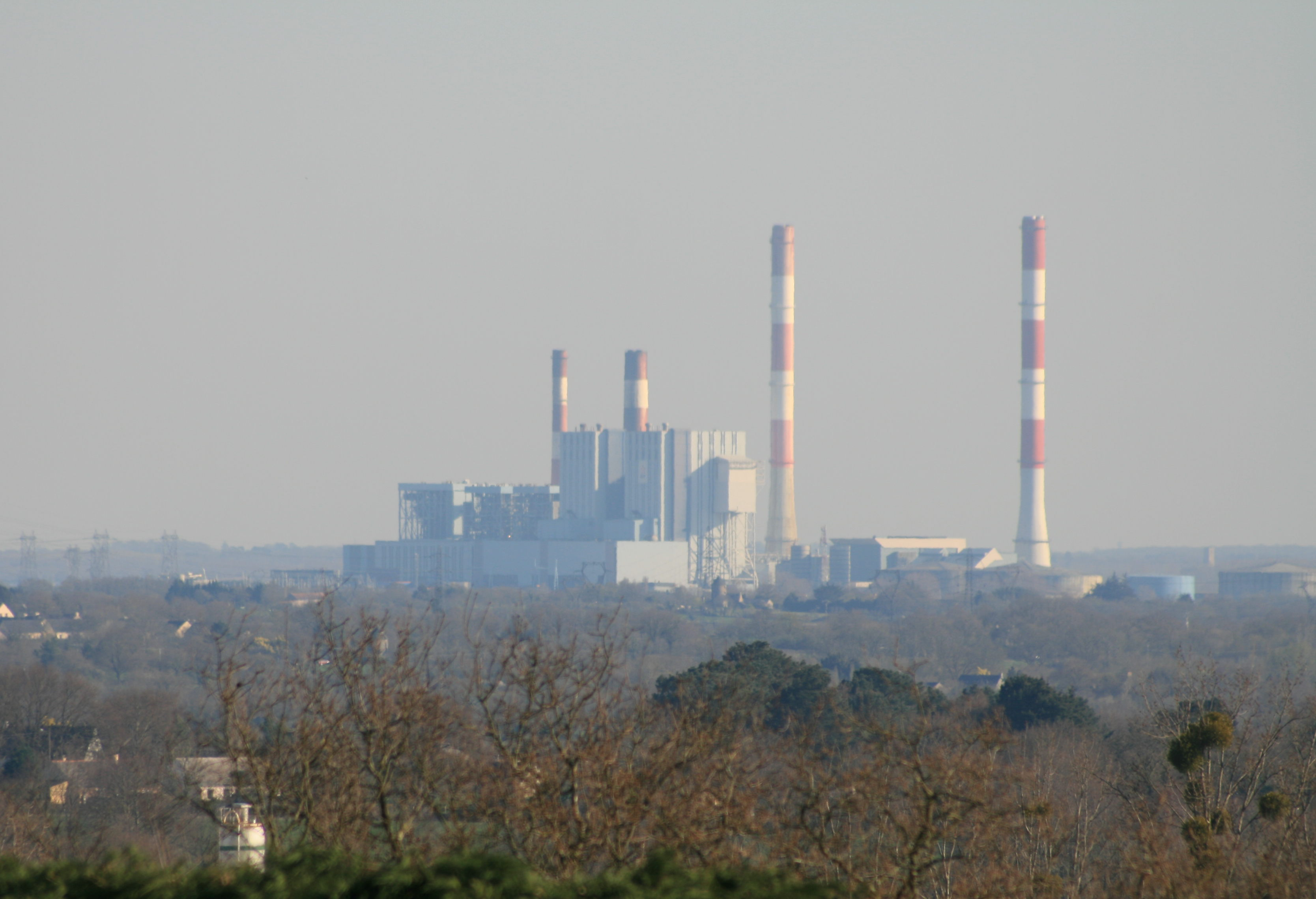
- Cordemais power station

- Coat of arms
- Location of Cordemais
- Location within France Location within Pays de la Loire
- Coordinates: 47°17′28″N 1°52′40″W
- Country: France
- Region: Pays de la Loire
- Department: Loire-Atlantique
- Arrondissement: Nantes
- Canton: Blain
- Intercommunality: Estuaire et Sillon

Government
  - Mayor (2020–2026): Daniel Guillé
- Area^{1}: 37.15 km^{2} (14.34 sq mi)
- Highest elevation: 91 m (299 ft)
- Lowest elevation: 0 m (0 ft)
- Population (2023): 4,012
  - Density: 108.0/km^{2} (279.7/sq mi)
- Time zone: UTC+01:00 (CET)
  - Summer (DST): UTC+02:00 (CEST)
- INSEE/Postal code: 44045 /44360
- ^{1} French Land Register data, which excludes lakes, ponds, glaciers > 1 km^{2} (0.386 sq mi or 247 acres) and river estuaries.

Cordemais (French pronunciation: [kɔʁdəmɛ]; Gallo: Cordemaè, Breton: Kordevez) is a commune situated in the Loire-Atlantique department in western France.

== Economy ==
Cordemais Power Station is located in the town.

== Population ==
Historical population

Year	Pop.	±% p.a.
1793	2,346	—
1821	2,511	+0.24%
1846	2,542	+0.05%
1872	2,559	+0.03%
1901	2,042	−0.78%
1926	1,653	−0.84%
1946	1,211	−1.54%
1962	1,360	+0.73%
1968	1,439	+0.95%

Year	Pop.	±% p.a.
1975	1,817	+3.39%
1982	2,004	+1.41%
1990	2,374	+2.14%
1999	2,515	+0.64%
2007	2,823	+1.45%
2012	3,294	+3.13%
2017	3,705	+2.38%
2023	4,012	+1.34%

Source: EHESS and INSEE (1968-2023)

== See also ==
- Communes of the Loire-Atlantique department
