= Cime de Caron =

Mountain in France

- Location within France

Highest point
- Elevation: 3,195 m (10,482 ft)
- Coordinates: 45°15′47″N 06°33′42″E

Geography
- Location: Savoie, France
- Parent range: Massif de la Vanoise

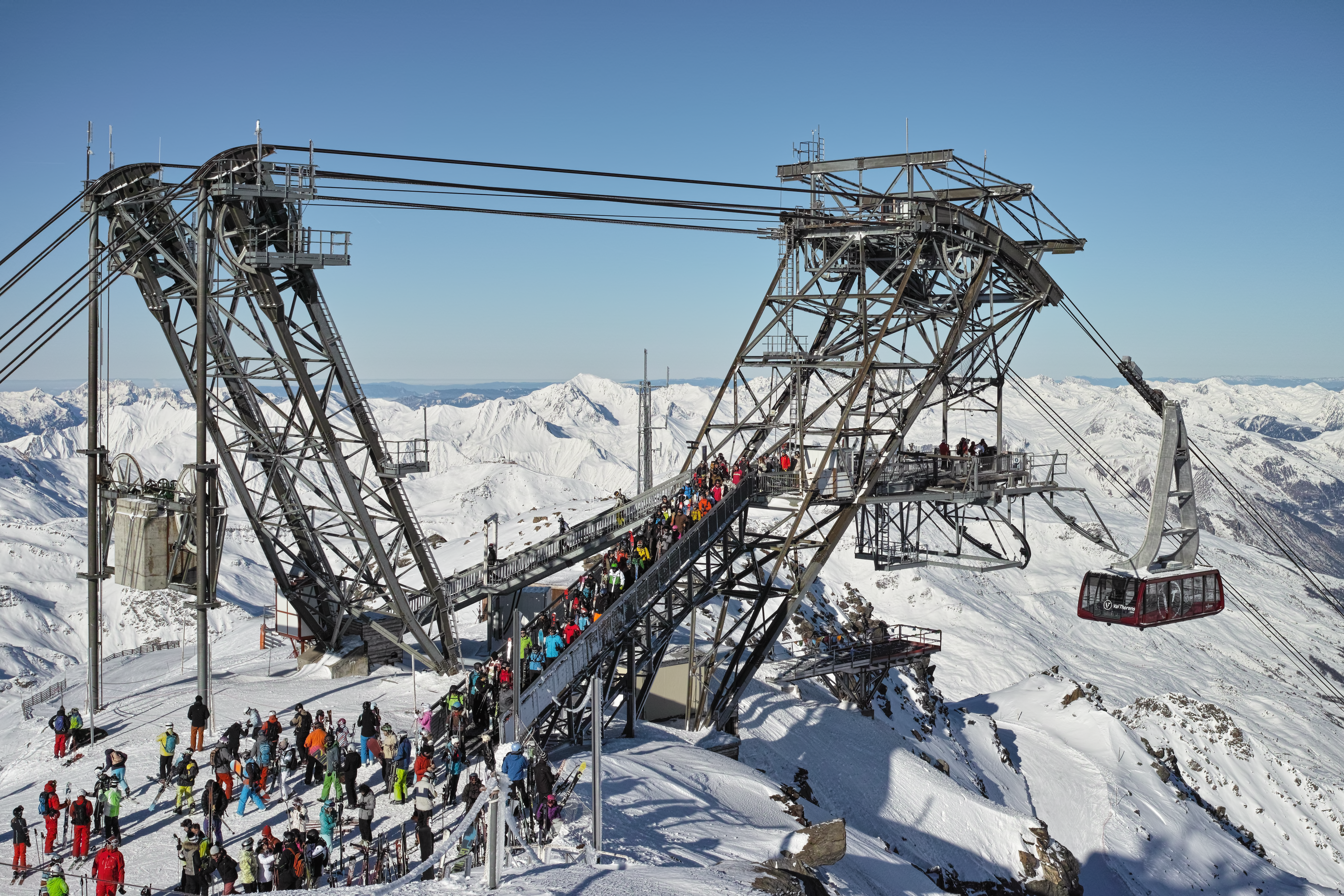
Top station

Cime de Caron is a mountain of Savoie, France. It lies in the Massif de la Vanoise range. It has an elevation of 3,195 metres (10,482 ft) above sea level. It is a mountain in the Three Valleys (Les Trois Vallées) a popular ski resort, in the valley of Les Belleville, in the resort of Val Thorens. It has four ski slopes: three black, and one red. One of the blacks (Combe de Rosael) goes into the secret fourth valley, in the three valleys, Orelle. Cime de Caron is the second-highest skiing point in the Three Valleys. A cable car was built on the mountain in 1982.
