= Lists of curling clubs =

This list contains lists of curling clubs worldwide:

== Canada ==
- List of curling clubs in Canada
  - List of curling clubs in Alberta
  - List of curling clubs in British Columbia
  - List of curling clubs in Manitoba
  - List of curling clubs in New Brunswick
  - List of curling clubs in Newfoundland and Labrador
  - List of curling clubs in Nova Scotia
  - List of curling clubs in Ontario
  - List of curling clubs in Prince Edward Island
  - List of curling clubs in Quebec
  - List of curling clubs in Saskatchewan
  - List of curling clubs in the Yukon, the Northwest Territories and Nunavut

== Other countries ==
- List of curling clubs in China
- List of curling clubs in Czech Republic
- List of curling clubs in Denmark
- List of curling clubs in France
- List of curling clubs in Germany
- List of curling clubs in Japan
- List of curling clubs in Lithuania
- List of curling clubs in New Zealand
- List of curling clubs in Norway
- List of curling clubs in Poland
- List of curling clubs in Russia
- List of curling clubs in Scotland
- List of curling clubs in Sweden
- List of curling clubs in Turkey
- List of curling clubs in the United States
