= Žabovřesky =

Žabovřesky may refer to places in the Czech Republic:

- Žabovřesky (České Budějovice District), a municipality and village in the South Bohemian Region
- Žabovřesky nad Ohří, a municipality and village in the Ústí nad Labem Region
- Žabovřesky, a village and part of Chlístov (Benešov District) in the Central Bohemian Region
- Brno-Žabovřesky, a borough of Brno in the South Moravian Region
