= Varney =

Varney may refer to:

== Places ==
- Varney, Ontario, a community in Canada
- Varney, Kentucky, an unincorporated community in the US
- Varney, West Virginia, an unincorporated community in the US
- Varney Nunatak, Victoria Land, Antarctica

== People ==
- Varney (surname)
- Varney (given name)

== Businesses ==
- Varney Air Lines, a former airline in Idaho, US, predecessor of United Airlines
- Varney Scale Models a maker of model railroad equipment

== Other ==
- "Varney the Vampire", a horror story

== See also ==
- Verney (disambiguation)
