= List of curling clubs in China =

== National Associations ==
- Chinese Curling Association
- Hong Kong Curling Association

== Clubs ==
- CSO Curling Club - Huairou, Beijing
- 奥星冰壶俱乐部 - Harbin, Heilongjiang
- KSR Curling Club 錦上路冰壶俱乐部 (In Construction/在建)
