= Verny, Russia =

Verny (Russian: Ве́рный; masculine), Vernaya (Ве́рная; feminine), or Vernoye (Ве́рное; neuter) is the name of several rural localities in Russia:

- Verny, Republic of Bashkortostan, a village in Kaltymanovsky Selsoviet of Iglinsky District of the Republic of Bashkortostan
- Verny, Belgorod Oblast, a khutor in Tishansky Rural Okrug of Volokonovsky District of Belgorod Oblast
- Verny, Saratov Oblast, a settlement in Pitersky District of Saratov Oblast
- Verny, Stavropol Krai, a khutor under the administrative jurisdiction of the Town of Novoalexandrovsk in Novoalexandrovsky District of Stavropol Krai
- Vernoye, a selo in Ukrainsky Rural Settlement of Seryshevsky District of Amur Oblast
