= Verny =

Verny may refer to:

- Verny, France, a commune in France
- Verny, Russia, a list of localities in Russia
- Almaty, Kazakhstan, known as Verny until 1921
- Verny (surname)

== See also ==
- Vernay (disambiguation)
- Verney (disambiguation)
