= Verney =

Verney may refer to:

== People ==
- Verney (surname)
- Verney family

== Places ==
- Beth-Eden, also known as Verney, a heritage-listed house in Brisbane, Queensland, Australia
- Verney Junction, a hamlet in Buckinghamshire, England
- Verney Junction railway station, a disused railway station in Buckinghamshire, England
- Verney Lake, a lake in Aosta Valley, Italy
- Lac du Verney, a lake in Isère, France

== Business ==
- Verney-Carron, a French weapon manufacturer

== See also ==
- Verny (disambiguation)
- Vernay (disambiguation)
- Varney (disambiguation)
