= Wheelchair curling classification =

Disability sport classification system

Wheelchair curling classification is the disability classification system for wheelchair curling, which is governed by the World Curling Federation. Only curlers with lower limb mobility problems are allowed to compete.

== Definition ==
Unlike skiing, there is a sport specific approach to classification for curling. It includes a medical examination. For wheelchair curling, there is only one class. Competitors go through a classification test to determine if they are eligible.

According to the Canadian Paralympic Committee, "Wheelchair curling is generally open to individuals, both male and female, with significant impairments in lower leg/gait function, who usually require a wheelchair for daily mobility (i.e. spinal injury, cerebral palsy, multiple sclerosis, or double leg amputation). More specifically, these are athletes who are non-ambulant or only able to walk short distances. Authorised international sports classifiers determine the minimum disability and appropriate classification."

== Governance ==
Classification is handled by the World Curling Federation. While the CP-ISRA has an interest in the sport because it is open to people with cerebral palsy, it is not governed by them. In the United States, classification is overseen by USA Curling. In Canada, classification is governed by the Canadian Curling Association.

== Eligibility ==
Only curlers with lower limb mobility problems are allowed to compete. The expectation is that most curlers will use a wheelchair in their daily life. Lower leg amputation competitors are allowed to participate in wheelchair sport following classification rules for them based on functional mobility.

== Process ==
In most countries, classification for national competitions is done through the local national Paralympic committee. For Australian competitors in this sport, the sport is not supported by the Australian Paralympic Committee. There are three types of classification available for Australian competitors: Provisional, national and international. The first is for club level competitions, the second for state and national competitions, and the third for international competitions.

== At the Paralympic Games ==
It was first played at the 2006 Winter Paralympics. Canada repeated as gold medal winners at the 2010 Winter Paralympics in Vancouver.

== Future ==
Going forward, disability sport's major classification body, the International Paralympic Committee, is working on improving classification to be more of an evidence-based system as opposed to a performance-based system so as not to punish elite athletes whose performance makes them appear in a higher class alongside competitors who train less.
