= List of curling clubs in the Czech Republic =

The following is a list of curling clubs in the Czech Republic. They are organized by the Czech Curling Association, a member of the World Curling Federation.

- 1. CK Brno - Brno
- Curling Brno - Brno
- SKN Brno - Brno
- 1. KCK Trutnov - Trutnov
- Handicap Sport Club Velké Meziříčí - Velké Meziříčí
- CC Citadela - Prague
- CC Savona - Prague
- CC Letící Kameny - Prague
- CC Kolibris - Prague
- CC Silscrap Zlatá Praha - Prague
- Klub z Viktorky - Prague
- CC Dion - Prague
- CC Kladno - Kladno
- Valící se šutráky - Brno
- Curling skid club Sušice - Sušice
- CC Zbraslav - Prague
- CC Prague Tee Party - Prague
- CC Demion - Prague
- Relax sport club Zbraslav - Prague
- Rychlopalná košťata - Brno
- CC Ledoborci - Prague
- CC Sokol Liboc - Prague
- CC Riper - Hradec Králové
- CC Karviná - Karviná
- VSK Přírodověda - Prague
- CC Loupežníci Jičín - Jičín
- Pražský lední club - Prague
- Sportovní Club Jedličkova Ústavu O.S. - Prague
- CC Meteorite Z.S.
- CC Kamenný Újezd
- Centrum Třešnovka Z.S. - Žabovřesky
