= Lac du Verney =

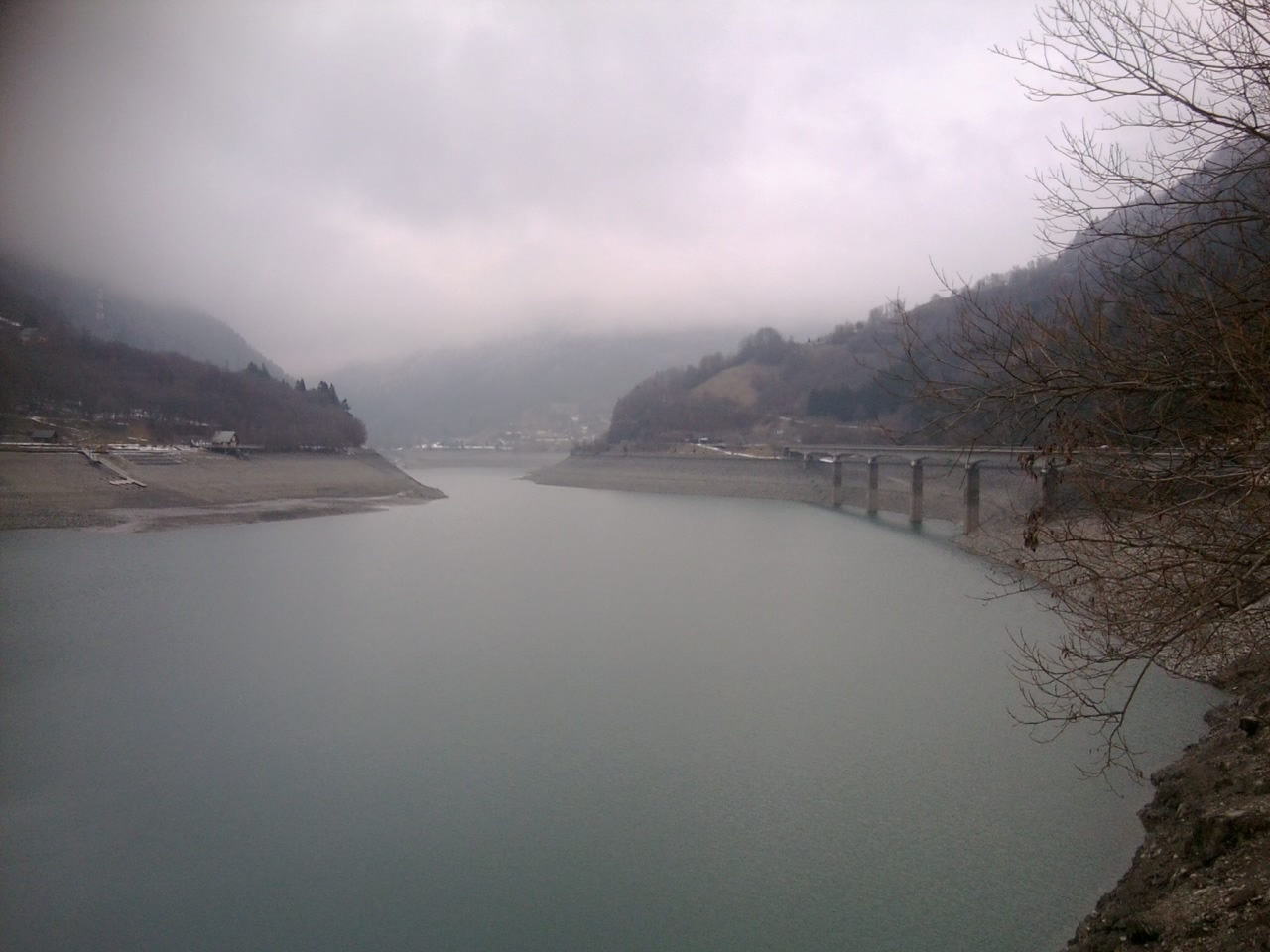
- Lac du Verney

- Location within France
- Location: France
- Coordinates: 45.138889°N 6.047222°E
- Type: reservoir
- Primary inflows: L'Eau d'Olle, & other small streams
- Primary outflows: River Romanche
- Basin countries: Isère, (Rhône-Alpes)

Lac du Verney (French pronunciation: [lak dy vɛʁnɛ]) is an artificial reservoir in the department of Isère, in the Rhône-Alpes of France. It serves as the lower reservoir for the Grand'Maison Dam pumped-storage scheme.

Neighbouring lakeside communities include Oz and Allemond.

Since 2006 it has hosted the opening swim of the Alpe d'Huez Triathlon.

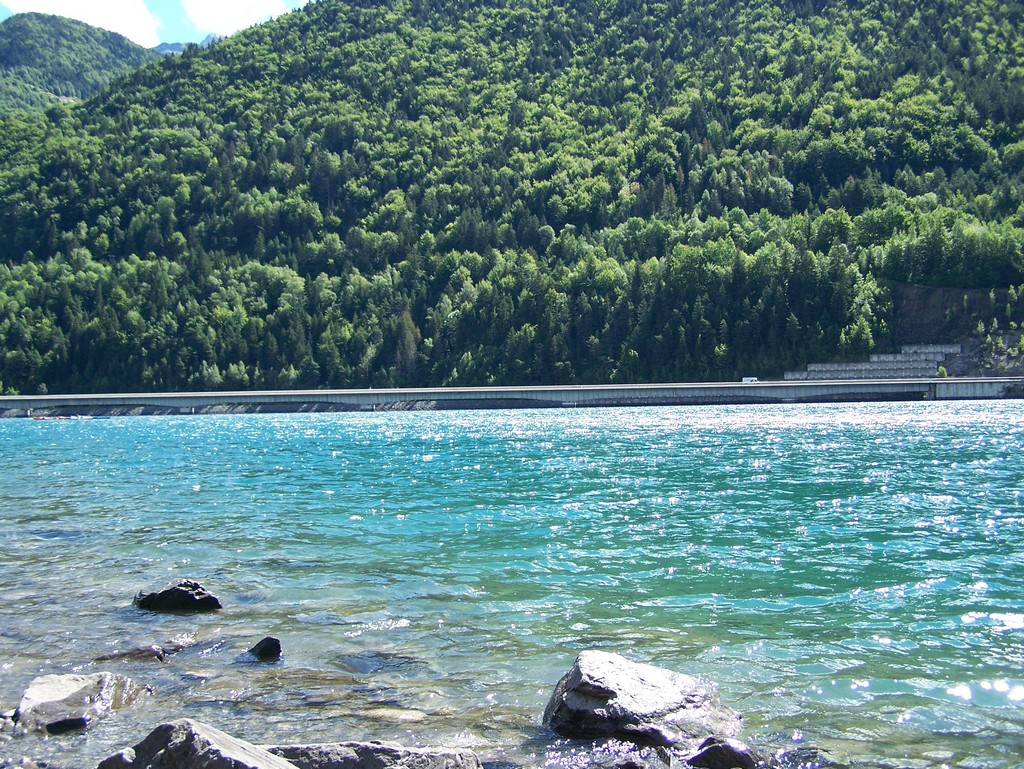
Dam wall of the Lac du Verney
