= List of curling clubs in Poland =

This is a list of curling clubs in Poland:

== Clubs ==
- City Curling Club, Warsaw
- Karkonosze Curling Club, Piechowice
- Media Curling Club, Warsaw
- Warsaw Curling Club, Warsaw
- Cracow Curling Club, Kraków
- KS Spójnia, Warsaw
- Silesian Curling Club, Katowice
- KS EURO 6, Warsaw
- Sopot Curling Club Wa ku'ta, Sopot
- AZS Łódź, Łódź
- Klub Środowiskowy AZS Politechniki Śląskie, Gliwice
- Toruński Klub Curlingowy, Toruń
- Ruda Śląska Curlik Curling Club, Ruda Śląska
- Gdański Curling Club, Gdańsk

== See also ==
- List of curling clubs
