= Lac de Grand Maison =

Lake in Isère, France

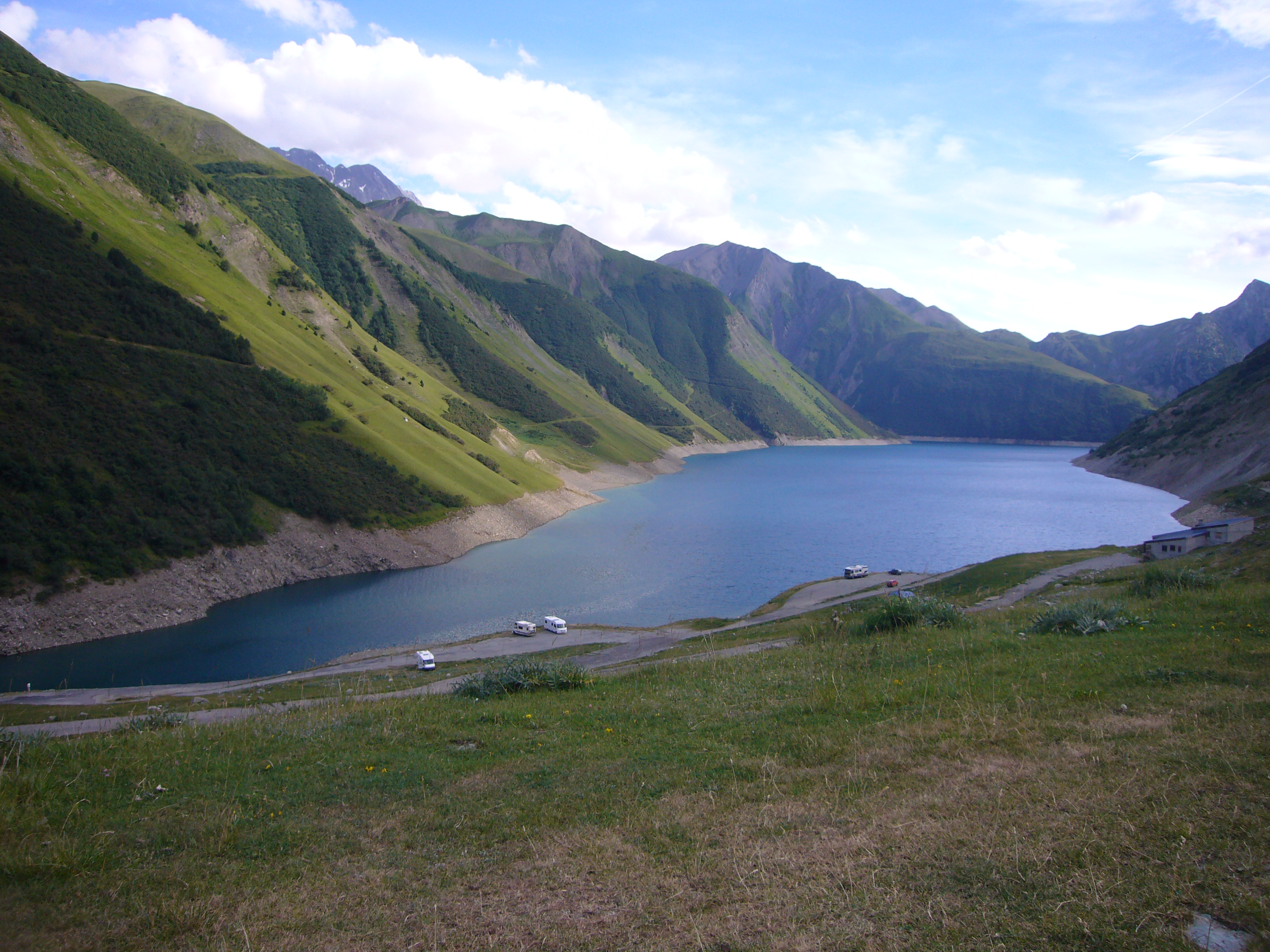

- Location within France
- Location: Isère
- Coordinates: 45°12′20″N 6°7′30″E
- Type: artificial
- Primary inflows: Eau d'Olle
- Basin countries: France
- Surface area: 2.19 km^{2} (0.85 sq mi)
- Max. depth: 90 m (300 ft)
- Surface elevation: 1,698 m (5,571 ft)

Lac de Grand Maison is a lake in Isère, France. At an elevation of 1698 m, its surface area is 2.19 km^{2}. It is created by the Grand'Maison Dam (constructed between 1978 and 1985) and serves as the upper reservoir in a pumped-storage hydroelectric scheme.

== Geography ==
Lake Grand'Maison is located between the Belledonne and Grandes Rousses mountain ranges, below the Col du Glandon pass. It extends across the communes of Vaujany in the Isère department (major part of the lake) and Saint-Colomban-des-Villards in the Savoie department.
