= Varney (surname) =

Varney is a surname, and may refer to:

- Allen Varney (born 1958), American writer and game designer
- Alphonse Varney (1811–1879), French conductor and composer, father of Louis
- Bill Varney (1934–2011), American motion picture sound mixer
- Carleton Varney (1937–2022), American decorator, designer, lecturer, and author
- Christine A. Varney (born 1955), American lawyer, lobbyist, public official
- Sir David Varney (born 1946), chairman of HM Revenue and Customs
- Dike Varney (1880–1950), American baseball pitcher
- Edmund Varney (1778–1847), New York politician
- Edward L. Varney (1914–1998), American Modernist architect
- Fallah Varney (1957–1981), Liberian soldier and coup leader
- George Varney (1834–1911), American soldier
- George D. Varney Sr. (1903–1982), American politician
- George J. Varney (1836–1901), American historian
- Harold Lord Varney (1893–1984), American author
- Janet Varney (fl. 2000s–2020s), American actress
- Jim Varney (1949–2000), American actor
- Louis Varney (1844–1908), French composer, son of Alphonse
- Luke Varney (born 1982), English football player
- Mike Varney (fl. 1980s–2020s), American record producer
- Pete Varney (born 1949), American baseball player
- Peter Varney (politician) (fl. 1990s–2020s), New Hampshire politician
- Reg Varney (1916–2008), English actor
- Stuart Varney (born 1948), economic journalist
- Walter Varney (1888–1967), American aviation pioneer
- William F. Varney (1884–1960), Prohibition Party politician from New York
