= Curling Hong Kong China =

- Sport: Curling
- Jurisdiction: Hong Kong
- Founded: 2014
- Affiliation: World Curling
- Affiliation date: 2014 (conditional); 2016 (full)
- President: John Li
- Secretary: Kelvin Cheung

Official website
- curling.org.hk
- (Hong Kong)

Curling Sports Federation of Hong Kong China (Chinese: 中國香港冰壺運動總會), or simply Curling Hong Kong China (Chinese: 中國香港冰壺), is the national governing body of the sport of curling in Hong Kong. It is responsible for promoting and developing the sport throughout the city, managing national curling teams, and representing the Hong Kong in international curling events.

== History ==
Curling Hong Kong China was established as the Hong Kong Curling Association (HKCurling). It was founded by former lecturer John Li Shek-chong in 2014. Li is also known for developing an iceless variation of the sport called "floor curling". HKCurling became conditional members of the World Curling Federation in September of the same year.

The men's national team made its debut at the 2015 Pacific-Asia Curling Championships.

The association became full members in 2016. The women's team was formed in the same year.

In January 2023, the Sports Federation and Olympic Committee of Hong Kong, China ordered its member association to include "China" in their names. HKCurling changed its name to Curling Hong Kong China which was approved by the Hong Kong Companies Registry by August 2024.

The Hong Kong curling teams made its debut in multisport competitions at the 2025 Asian Winter Games in Harbin, China.
