= List of curling clubs in Lithuania =

This is a list of curling clubs in Lithuania:

== National organizations ==
- Lithuania Curling Association

== Teams ==
Main curling teams in Lithuania:

- Mice on Ice
- De-Arch
- T-Rink
- Snaikas
- Nomoshiti

Lithuanian Curling Association members:

- Klaipėdos ledo ritulio klubas (Klaipėda)
- Skipas (Vilnius)
- Arena (Vilnius)
- Svajotojas (Vilnius)
- Snaikas (Vilnius)
- Snaigė (Ignalina)
- Kerlita (Vilnius)
- Kervila (Vilnius)
- Lithuanian Curling Sport Federation (Vilnius)
- Association Curling (Vilnius)

== See also ==
- List of curling clubs
