= Kate Caithness =

Scottish curler

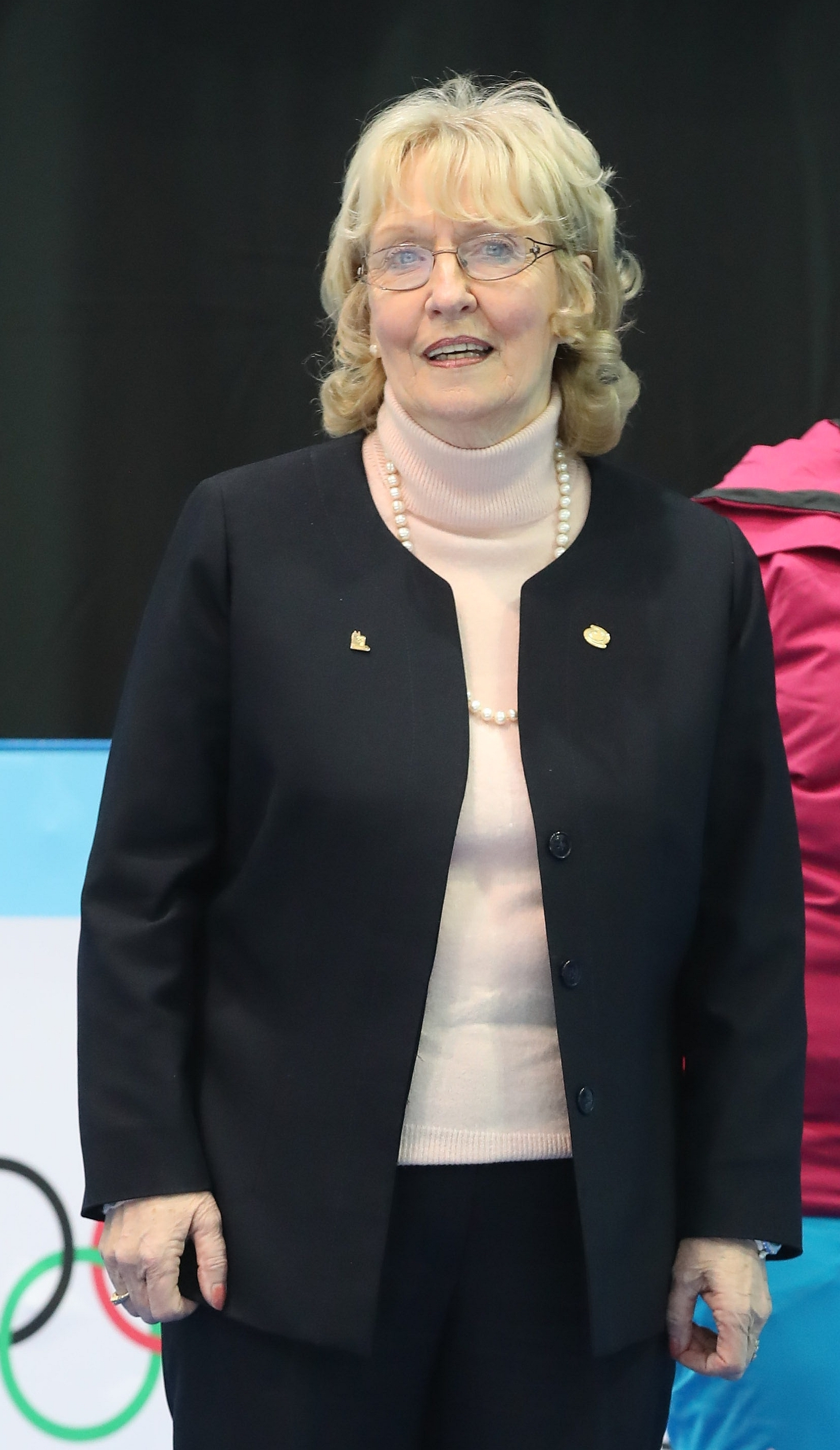
Kate Caithness at the 2020 Winter Youth Olympics

Kate Caithness CBE is a Scottish curler. She served as the President of the World Curling Federation from 2010 to 2022.

== Career ==
Caithness began curling in the 1980s, playing for the Royal Caledonian Curling Club. From 1997 to 1998, she served as the president of the club's ladies branch, later representing the Club at the World Curling Federation. At the World Curling Federation, Caithness promoted wheelchair curling, helping make it a Paralympic sport in 2006 in Turin.

Caithness served on the International Paralympic Committee's Sports Council Management Committee from 2005 to 2009, and on the Paralympic Games Committee from 2006 to 2009.

In 2006, Caithness was elected vice-president, and in 2010 President, of the World Curling Federation. She is the first female president of the World Curling Federation, as well as the first female president of any Olympic Winter Sports Federation.

On 29 December 2012 Kate Caithness was bestowed the honour of an OBE (Officer of the Most Excellent Order of the British Empire) for services to curling and international disability sport. It was presented to her by Her Majesty Queen Elizabeth II at a ceremony in Edinburgh, Scotland.

Speaking about the award, Caithness said: “I am absolutely thrilled and delighted. It is a great honour and is wonderful recognition for the sport of curling and wheelchair curling and all those involved in playing and developing the sport.”

She was appointed a Commander of the Order of the British Empire in the 2019 New Year Honours for services to Sport.

== The growth of curling ==
In an interview in the Edmonton Sun, Caithness spoke about the growth of Curling:

“Curling has become the world’s fastest growing sport and I’m not sure most Canadians realize that fact. We’re widely acknowledged as this being the case. There’s no doubt that that the Olympic Winter Games has put curling in the spotlight. And Vancouver was the launching pad. Vancouver is where we became a sexy sport. Vancouver was huge. It just captured everybody’s imagination.”

“The Olympics and television keep giving us our window to the world,” said Caithness. “And Vancouver opened it like it had never been opened before.

“Television brings the focus to our sport and it has since Nagano ’98 when all those ski events kept getting postponed by weather and they went to curling instead.

“In Vancouver we had 1,125 hours of curling broadcast in 35 territories and that includes Europe, where we have 38 member associations as one. And we’re going to have even more hours and more countries from Sochi 2014.

“In Vancouver curling became the third most watched sport globally of the Olympics.

“In Brazil it was the most watched sport. Imagine that. In Brazil. No. 1. We have no idea how that happened, but they fell in love with it.

“An average minute of curling from Vancouver was watched by 22 million people. Average minute! Twenty-two million! In Japan it was six million alone.

“From Olympics to Olympics from Vancouver proceeding to Sochi, it’s been crazy.

“There are now 24 new curling countries since Vancouver.

“Mongolia!” she said of one of them.

“We’re now going into South America and the Middle East. “And the United States has really taken off. They’re our sleeping giant.”

“And China ... I think what China loves is that it’s chess on ice.”

“It’s like in 2009 we took the women’s world championships to Gangneung, Korea where the 2018 Winter Olympics will be held. It was Sweden vs China in the final and it drew a live audience of 65 million worldwide.

The broadcast reached 65 million viewers globally.
