= List of curling clubs in Japan =

This is a list of curling clubs in Japan:

== Clubs ==
=== Hokkaido Island ===
- Loco Solare/Tokoro CC (a.k.a. LS Kitami)
- Hokkaido Bank Fortius (see also Hokkaido Bank)

=== Aomori Prefecture ===
- Team Aomori (closed in 2013)

=== Akita Prefecture ===
- Akita University Curling Team

=== Nagano Prefecture ===
- SC Karuizawa Club (Nonprofit organization)
- Chubu Electric Power CC (see also Chubu Electric Power)

=== Yamanashi Prefecture ===
- Team Fujikyu (see also Fujikyu)

== National organizations ==
- Japan Curling Association

== Prefecture-level organizations ==
- Hokkaido Curling Association (北海道カーリング協会)
- Aomori Curling Association (青森県カーリング協会)
- Nagano Curling Association (長野県カーリング協会)
- Yamanashi Curling Association (山梨県カーリング協会)

== See also ==
- List of curling clubs
