= English Curling Association =

Sports governing body

- Sport: Curling
- Jurisdiction: National
- Founded: 1971
- Affiliation: World Curling Federation
- Affiliation date: 1971
- President: Gordon Lyon

Official website
- www.curlingengland.com
- (England)

The English Curling Association (ECA) is the national governing body of the sport of curling in England. While the ECA is a full member of the World Curling Federation, it also is a member of British Curling which manages Great Britain's Olympic and Paralympic curling programs.

There are currently two dedicated curling facilities in England: the Flower Bowl in Lancashire, home to Preston Curling Club; and at Tunbridge Wells Curling Club in Kent, following the rink reopening in 2025. Curling can also be found semi-regularly at Cambridge Ice Rink, where Cambridge Curling Club meet on Sundays.

There are other clubs in the north of England, such as Glendale, which plays matches in rinks across the Scottish border. Saint George's Curling Club also offers English curlers living in Scotland a club, though they are not focussed at any one rink.
