= Vernay =

Vernay may refer to:

== People ==
- Vernay (surname)

== Places ==
- Vernay, Rhône, a commune (municipality) and former bishopric in the southeastern French region of Rhône-Alpes
- Vernay, Switzerland, a municipality in the Swiss canton of Fribourg

== See also ==
- Verney (disambiguation)
- Verny (disambiguation)
