= List of curling clubs in Russia =

This is a list of Russian curling federations and clubs.

== Federations ==
Title	Links
National
Russian Curling Federation	curling.ru (in Russian)
Regional
Moscow Curling Federation	curlingmoscow.ru (in Russian)
Saint Petersburg and Leningrad Oblast Curling Federation	address, phone etc. (in Russian)
Moscow Oblast Curling Federation	
Chelyabinsk Oblast Curling Federation	
Irkutsk Oblast Curling Federation	
Kaliningrad Oblast Curling Federation	address, phone etc. (in Russian)
Krasnodar Krai Curling Federation (including Sochi)	
Krasnoyarsk Krai Curling Federation	curling24.ru (in Russian)
Lipetsk Oblast Curling Federation	
Novosibirsk Oblast Curling Federation	curling54.ru/ (in Russian)
Omsk Oblast Curling Federation	curling-omsk.ru (in Russian)
Primorski Krai Curling Federation (including Vladivostok)	
Sakha Republic (Yakutia) Curling Federation	
Samara Oblast Curling Federation	
Sverdlovsk Oblast Curling Federation (including Ekaterinburg) (or Ural Curling Federation)	curling66.a5.ru/ Facebook (in Russian)
Tatarstan Curling Federation (including Kazan)	
Udmurtia Curling Federation	
Vologda Oblast Curling Federation	

== Clubs and teams ==
Curling club (en)	(ru)	City	Region	Links
Ice Planet CC	Планета Льда	Moscow		
Moscow CC	Московский кёрлинг-клуб	Moscow		site (in Russian)
New League CC	Новая Лига	Moscow		
TeeLine CC	ТиЛайн	Moscow		site (in Russian and English)
Vorobjevy Gory (Sparrow Hills)	Воробьёвы горы	Moscow		site (in Russian)
Dmitrov CC	Дмитров	Dmitrov	Moscow Oblast	
Adamant CC	Адамант	Saint-Petersburg		site (in Russian)

(sources:)

== See also ==
- List of curling clubs
