= List of curling clubs in France =

This is a list of curling clubs in France.

City	Name of the club	Web site
Albertville	Olympique Glace Club Albertville	
Allauch	Club de Curling Massilia	
Besançon	Club de Curling de Besançon	
Belfort	ASM Belfort Vitesse	
Viry-Châtillon	Club de Curling de Viry-Châtillon	
Vaujany	Pierres de feu Curling Vaujany	
Valence	Valence Curling	
Ostwald	Club de Curling Kléber de Strasbourg	
Saint Pierre et Miquelon	Club de Curling de Saint Pierre	
Saint Gervais-les-Bains	Curling-Club Saint-Gervais	
Rouen	Club Olympique de Rouen	
Pralognan-la-Vanoise	Club de Curling de Pralognan	
Metz	Graoully Metz Curling	https://graoully.club/
Nice	Club de Curling de Nice	
Nice	Association Nice Baies des Anges	
Mulhouse	ASG Mulhouse	
Megève	Megève Club des Sports	
Lyon	Lyon Curling	https://lyon-curling.fr/
Prémanon	Sports de Glace Haut Jura	
Huez	Joyeux Rolling Stone	
Crolles	Grenoble Isère Métropole Patinage	
Les Contamines-Montjoie	Contamines Mointjoie	
Charleville-Mézières	Charleville Mézières SG	
Chamonix	Chamonix Club des Sports	
Chambéry	Chambéry CSG	
Bordeaux	Bordeaux Sports de Glace	
La Garde	Curling La Garde	
