= Vaujany =

- Commune
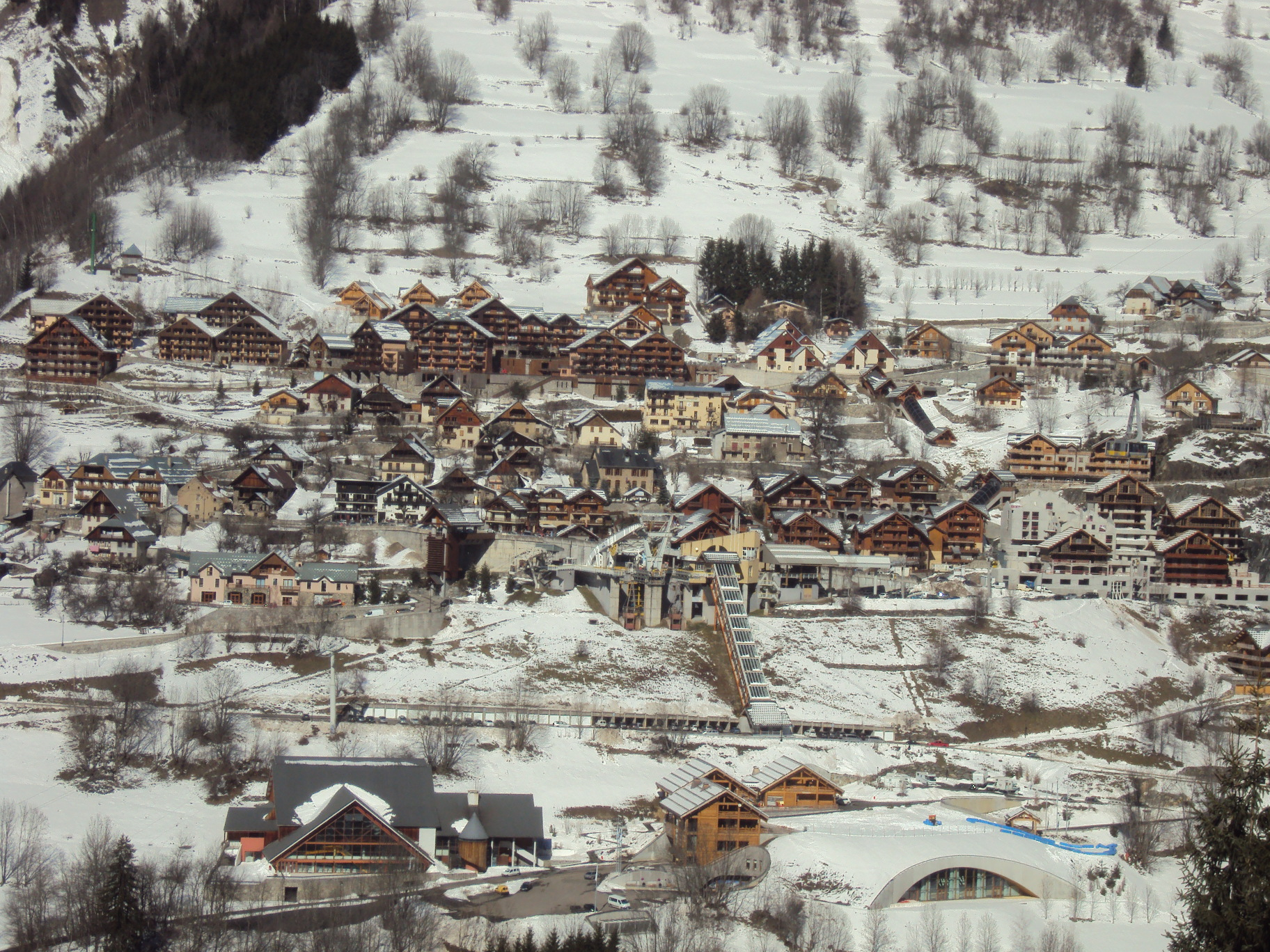
- The village seen from the cable car

- Coat of arms
- Location of Vaujany
- Location within France Location within Auvergne-Rhône-Alpes
- Coordinates: 45°09′31″N 6°04′39″E
- Country: France
- Region: Auvergne-Rhône-Alpes
- Department: Isère
- Arrondissement: Grenoble
- Canton: Oisans-Romanche

Government
  - Mayor (2020–2026): Yves Genevois
- Area^{1}: 64.5 km^{2} (24.9 sq mi)
- Highest elevation: 3,464 m (11,365 ft)
- Lowest elevation: 752 m (2,467 ft)
- Population (2023): 357
  - Density: 5.53/km^{2} (14.3/sq mi)
- Time zone: UTC+01:00 (CET)
  - Summer (DST): UTC+02:00 (CEST)
- INSEE/Postal code: 38527 /38114
- ^{1} French Land Register data, which excludes lakes, ponds, glaciers > 1 km^{2} (0.386 sq mi or 247 acres) and river estuaries.

Vaujany (French pronunciation: [voʒani]) is a commune in the canton of Oisans-Romanche, in the Isère department in southeastern France. The village is picturesque, with excellent views of the Grand Galbert mountain at the head of the valley.

== Population ==
Historical population
Year	Pop.	±% p.a.
1968	270	—
1975	224	−2.63%
1982	412	+9.10%
1990	242	−6.43%
1999	311	+2.83%
2007	311	+0.00%
2012	303	−0.52%
2017	337	+2.15%
2023	357	+0.97%
Source: INSEE

== Economy ==
The hydroelectric dams of Grand'Maison (completed 1985) and Verney pay Vaujany annual rents of just over 3 million euros. This money has enabled the commune to fund the continuing development of leisure facilities. Vaujany is linked by cable car and gondola lift to the Alpe d'Huez ski area, so Vaujany benefits from winter sport and summer mountain tourism. Two runs drop down into the valley from the ski area above, and a short connecting lift from each run takes skiers to the village.

== Grande Boucle Féminine stage finishes ==
Vaujany has been a frequent mountain-top finish in the Grande Boucle Féminine bicycle race (the equivalent of the Tour de France for female riders). It has been used on 13 occasions – every year from 1992 to 2003, and again in 2005.

Year	Stage	Start of stage	Distance	Stage winner
2005	6	Allemond	6.5 km	(Switzerland) Priska Doppmann
2003	5	L'Argentière-La-Bessée	108.5 km	(Italy) Fabiana Luperini
2002	8	Courchevel	113.6 km	(Russia) Valentina Polkhanova
2001	13	Guillestre	135.5 km	(Italy) Fabiana Luperini
2000	10	Lans-en-Vercors	76.5 km	(France) Séverine Desbouys
1999	9	La-Chapelle-en-Vercors	129.8 km	(Russia) Valentina Polkhanova
1998	9	Gap	120 km	(Italy) Fabiana Luperini
1997	5	Valloire	86 km	(Italy) Fabiana Luperini
1996	10	Guillestre	125 km	(Italy) Fabiana Luperini
1995	4	Albertville	114.7 km	(Italy) Fabiana Luperini
1994	11			(Lithuania) Rasa Polikevičiūtė
1993	11	Le Fontanil Cornillon	77.8 km	(United Kingdom) Marie Purvis
1992	8	Serre Chevallier	70.4 km	(France) Cécile Odin

== Cable car accident ==
During a test run of a new cable car (which was to be the largest and fastest in the world), one week before its expected opening date on 13 January 1989, the cable car fell 250 m (820 ft) into the valley below while the cabin was passing a point 200 m (660 ft) from the arrival station. There were eight technicians on board the lift, all of whom died. They had all worked for SATA (the lift operator) or Poma (the lift builder). An expert witness at the trial claimed that the design was a poor-quality copy of a Swiss system, leading to design problems which rendered the operation of the cable car unsafe. Poma did not have much experience building this style of lift at the time and had agreed to complete the construction in ten months, compared to the two years proposed by some of its rivals, leading to claims that corners had been cut in the construction of the lift. The consulting engineer (Denis Creissels) also suggested that there was a lack of communication between the companies. On 9 September 1996 five people were charged with manslaughter at the criminal court of Grenoble; these were Jean-Pierre Cathiard (CEO of Poma), Serge Tarassof (technical director), Reylans Michel (engineer), Denis Creissels (supervisor) and Jacques Lombard (chief engineer). As part of the trial, four experts highlighted many mistakes made by Poma, most of which were based on the stabilizer, which had been copied from another company before having further issues added to its design.

== See also ==
- Communes of the Isère department
