= List of curling clubs in Denmark =

The following is a list of curling clubs in Denmark. They are organized by the Danish Curling Association which is a member of the World Curling Federation.

- Aalborg Curling Klub - Aalborg
- Aarhus Curling Klub - Aarhus
- Curling Club Odin - Vojens
- Copenhagen Curling Club - Kastrup
- Esbjerg Curling Klub - Esbjerg
- Frederikshavn Curling Klub - Frederikshavn
- Gentofte Curling Club - Gentofte
- Hvidovre Curling Club - Hvidovre
- Kastrup Motions and Curling Club - Kastrup
- Margarita Curling Club - Kastrup
- Odense Curling Club - Odense
- Rungsted Curling Klub - Nærum
- Silkeborg Curling Club - Silkeborg
- Tårnby Curling Club - Kastrup
