= Curling in India =

- Country: India
- Governing body: Curling Federation of India
- National team: India

India is considered an emerging country in the sport of curling. The country's men's team finished second in the B-Division of the 2022 Pan Continental Curling Championships. India's mixed doubles team also won silver at the 2022 Kazakhstan Curling Cup WCT Mixed Doubles World Curling Tour event.

Due to the cold weather and presence of snow and ice, Gulmarg is the site of the annual National Curling Championships.

Curling was played in Gulmarg as part of the Khelo India Winter Games 2023.

== National championships ==
- 1st National Curling Championship, 2021–22, Gulmarg
- 2nd National Curling Championship, 2022–23, Gulmarg
- 2nd National Floor Curling Championship, 2023, Itanagar
- 3rd National Curling Championship, 2023–24, Gulmarg
