= Chinese Curling Association =

Sports governing body

Chinese Curling Association is the governing body for the sport of curling in the People's Republic of China. It has been a member of the World Curling Federation since 2002.
