= Allemond =

- Commune
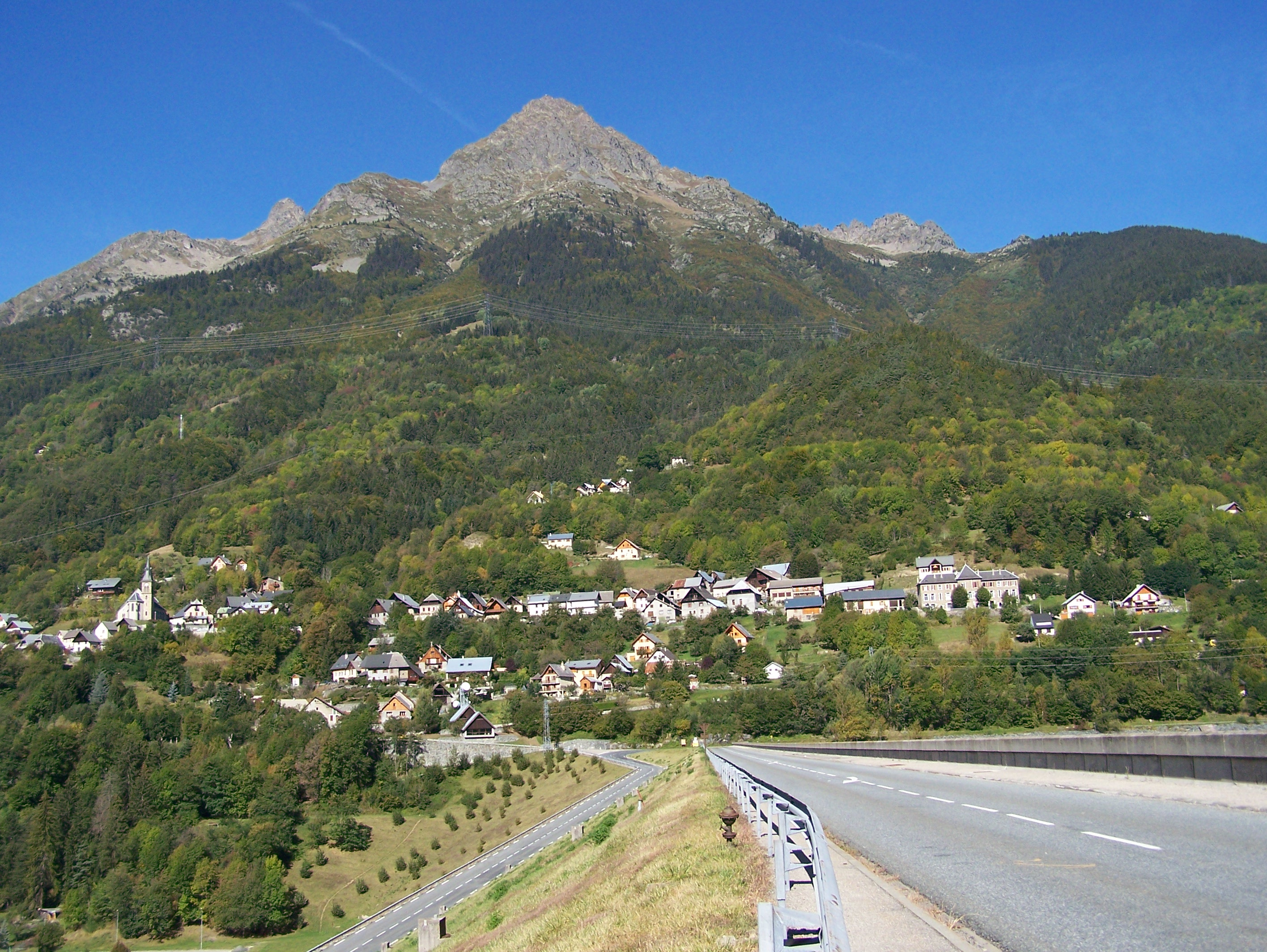
- A general view of Allemond
- Location of Allemond
- Location within France Location within Auvergne-Rhône-Alpes
- Coordinates: 45°07′52″N 6°02′18″E
- Country: France
- Region: Auvergne-Rhône-Alpes
- Department: Isère
- Arrondissement: Grenoble
- Canton: Oisans-Romanche
- Intercommunality: Oisans

Government
  - Mayor (2020–2026): Alain Ginies
- Area^{1}: 45 km^{2} (17 sq mi)
- Highest elevation: 2,969 m (9,741 ft)
- Lowest elevation: 702 m (2,303 ft)
- Population (2023): 971
  - Density: 22/km^{2} (56/sq mi)
- Time zone: UTC+01:00 (CET)
  - Summer (DST): UTC+02:00 (CEST)
- INSEE/Postal code: 38005 /38114
- ^{1} French Land Register data, which excludes lakes, ponds, glaciers > 1 km^{2} (0.386 sq mi or 247 acres) and river estuaries.

Allemond (French pronunciation: [almɔ̃]; spelled Allemont by the local council) is a commune in the Isère department in the Auvergne-Rhône-Alpes region of south-eastern France.

== Geography ==
Allemond is a small mountain village in the heart of the Oisans in the valley of the Eau d'Olle, at the foot of the Belledonne mountains in the Grandes Rousses basin. It is located some 20 km east of Saint-Martin-d'Hères and 30 km south of Pontcharra. Access to the commune is by the D526 road from the south which passes through the village then continues north along the eastern border of the commune before turning west. The commune consists of high mountains with forests on the lower slopes.

=== Localities and hamlets in the commune ===
- La traverse (1300 m high)
- Le clot
- La rivoire
- La combe
- Le Mas des Croze
- Le village
- Les grands champs
- La ville
- La fondrie
- La pernière haute et basse
- Pissevache
- Farnier
- Champeau
- Le villaret
- La drayrie
- Baton (700 m high)
- Coteysard
- Le Mollard
- Le Rivier
- L'eau Dolle
- Les 4 saisons

== History ==
The first buildings were built in the town in the Middle Ages.

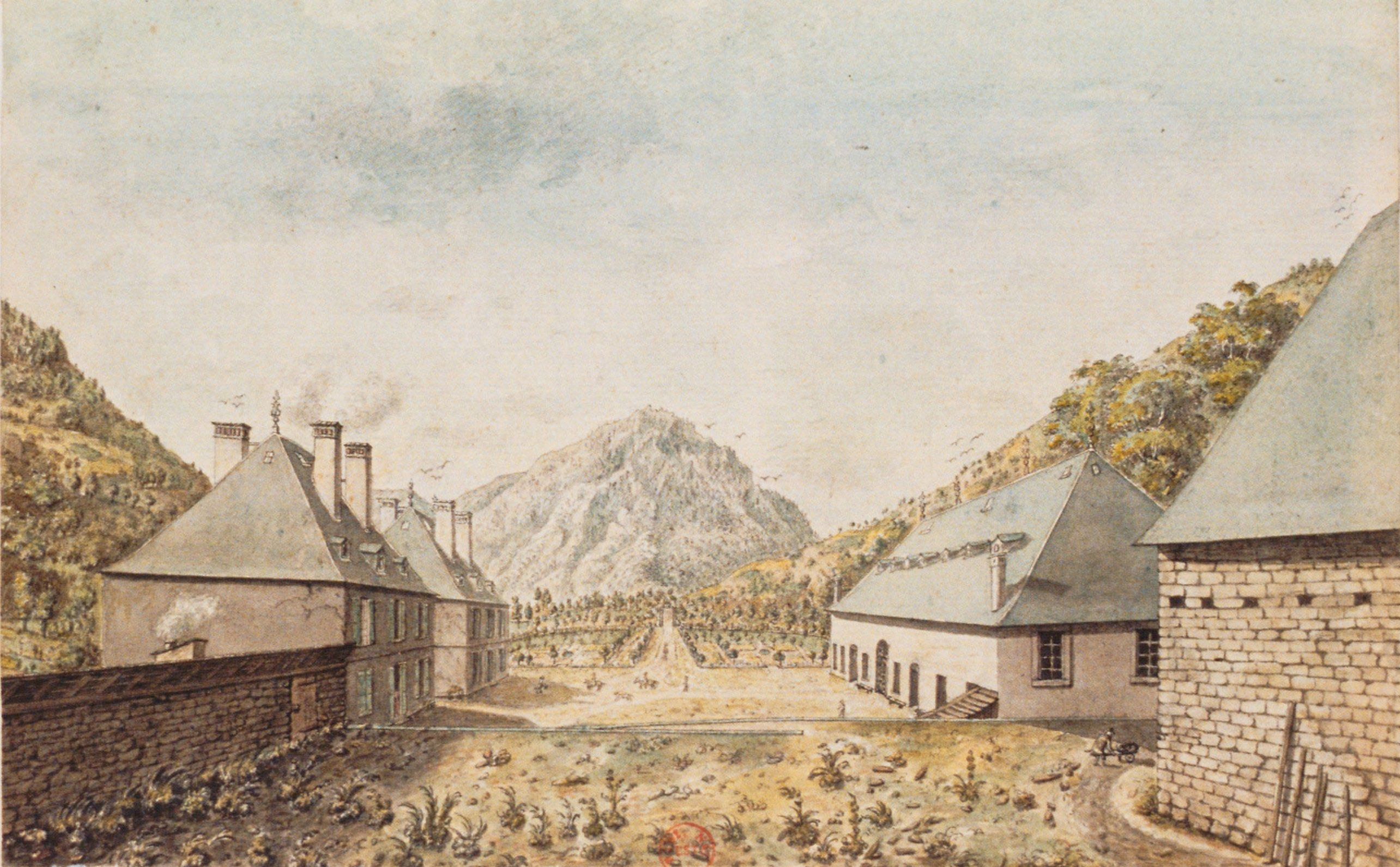
Allemond Royal Foundry (18th century)

Until the 1960s the life of the people was very simple: they were mainly farmers and herders.

The city also had mining activity under Louis XIII and Louis XIV. It housed the Royal foundries in which ore from mines in the town - mainly silver, lead, and copper - were melted down. Part of the buildings from the former royal foundry long housed the hotel called "Les Tilleuls" (now closed). This hotel with its beautiful walnut staircase was bought in 1920 by a former mayor of the town (for 40 years). His two daughters, Marguerite and Raymonde Giroutru, local personalities, then controlled the propertry for a long time. It was said that Napoleon III stayed at the hotel.

In the late 1970s, the Grand Maison Dam project was launched, it was an economic windfall for the commune and the whole region. The project lasted 10 years and brought in hundreds of workers.

The communes involved were able to invest in tourism and winter sports equipment so ensuring their future once the work was finished.

Today the commune lives completely on tourism both in summer and winter.

== Administration ==
List of Successive Mayors

From	To	Name	Party
1989	2001	Michel Roche	ind.
2001	2026	Alain Ginies	ind.

== Demography ==
The inhabitants of the commune are known as Allemondins or Allemondines in French.

Historical population

Year	Pop.	±% p.a.
1793	1,012	—
1800	1,169	+2.08%
1806	1,184	+0.21%
1821	1,017	−1.01%
1831	1,275	+2.29%
1836	1,353	+1.19%
1841	1,546	+2.70%
1846	1,527	−0.25%
1851	1,555	+0.36%
1856	1,346	−2.85%
1861	1,225	−1.87%
1866	1,216	−0.15%
1872	1,240	+0.33%
1876	1,188	−1.07%
1881	1,245	+0.94%
1886	1,254	+0.14%
1891	1,189	−1.06%
1896	1,113	−1.31%
1901	1,102	−0.20%

Year	Pop.	±% p.a.
1906	1,146	+0.79%
1911	970	−3.28%
1921	954	−0.17%
1926	826	−2.84%
1931	804	−0.54%
1936	737	−1.73%
1946	654	−1.19%
1954	587	−1.34%
1962	530	−1.27%
1968	514	−0.51%
1975	544	+0.81%
1982	958	+8.42%
1990	600	−5.68%
1999	765	+2.74%
2007	867	+1.58%
2012	956	+1.97%
2017	971	+0.31%
2023	971	+0.00%

Source: EHESS and INSEE

== Sites and monuments ==
=== Religious heritage ===
The Church contains a Bronze Bell (1657) which is registered as an historical object.

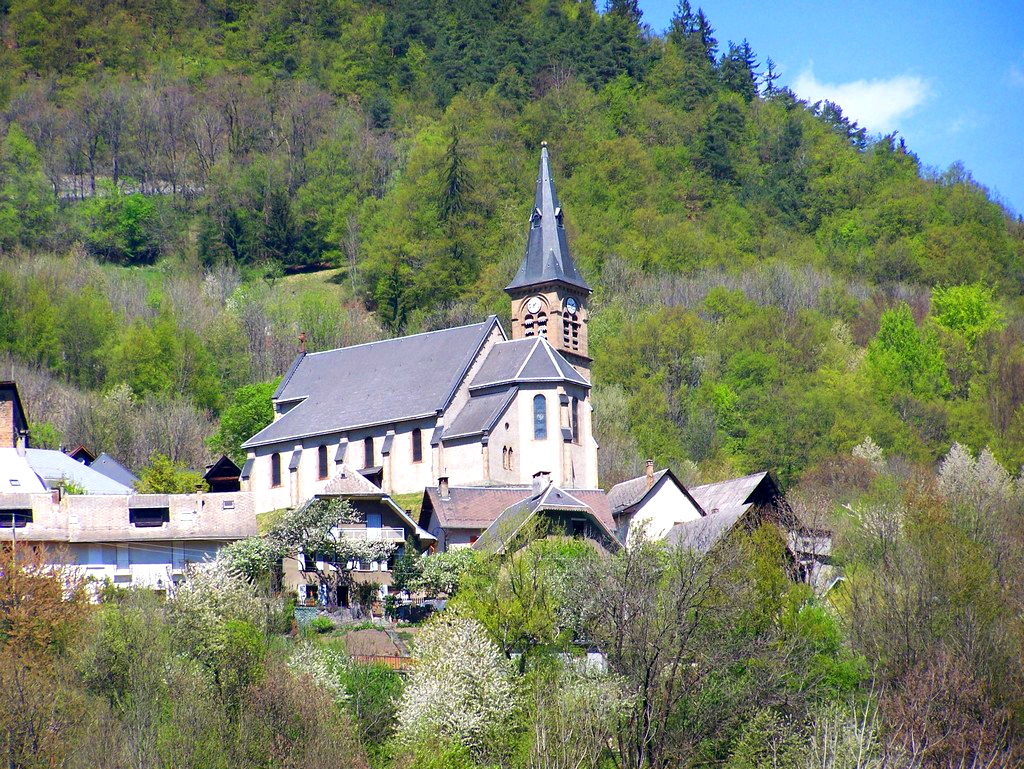
Allemond Church

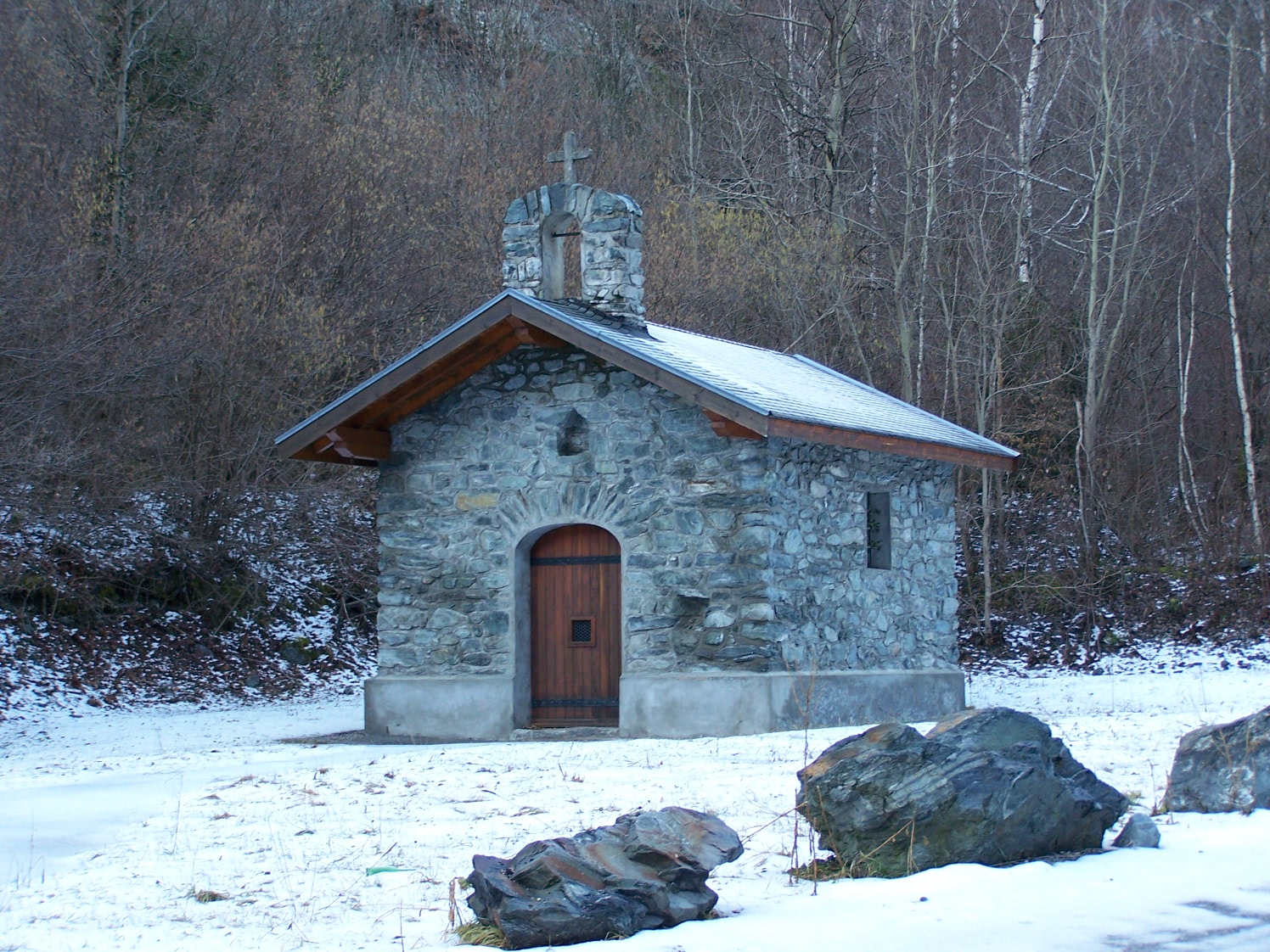
The Baton Chapel

=== Civil heritage ===
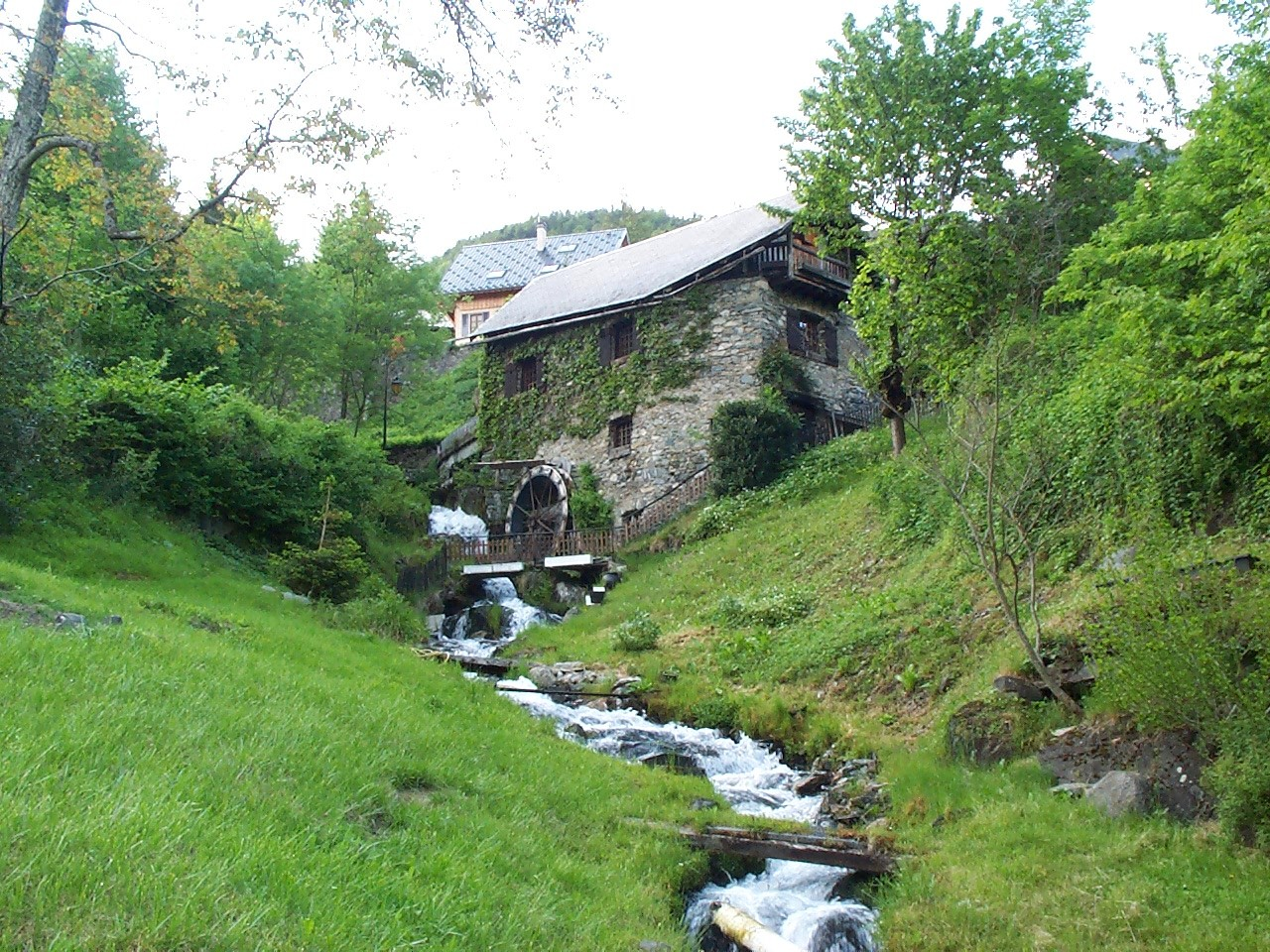
The Old Mill

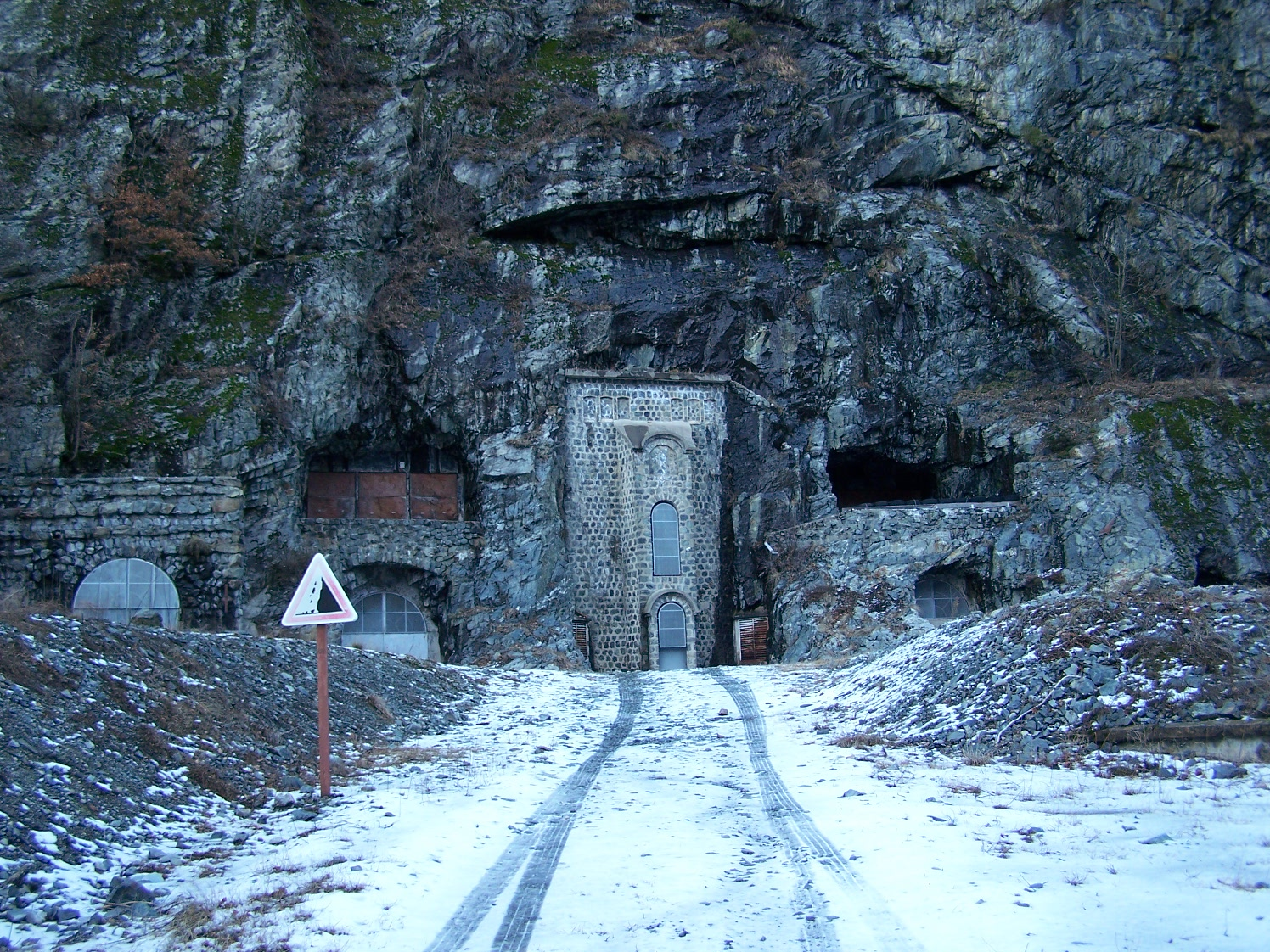
The EDF Centre at Baton: Electricity plant dating from the beginning of the 20th century at an altitude of 1,300 metres

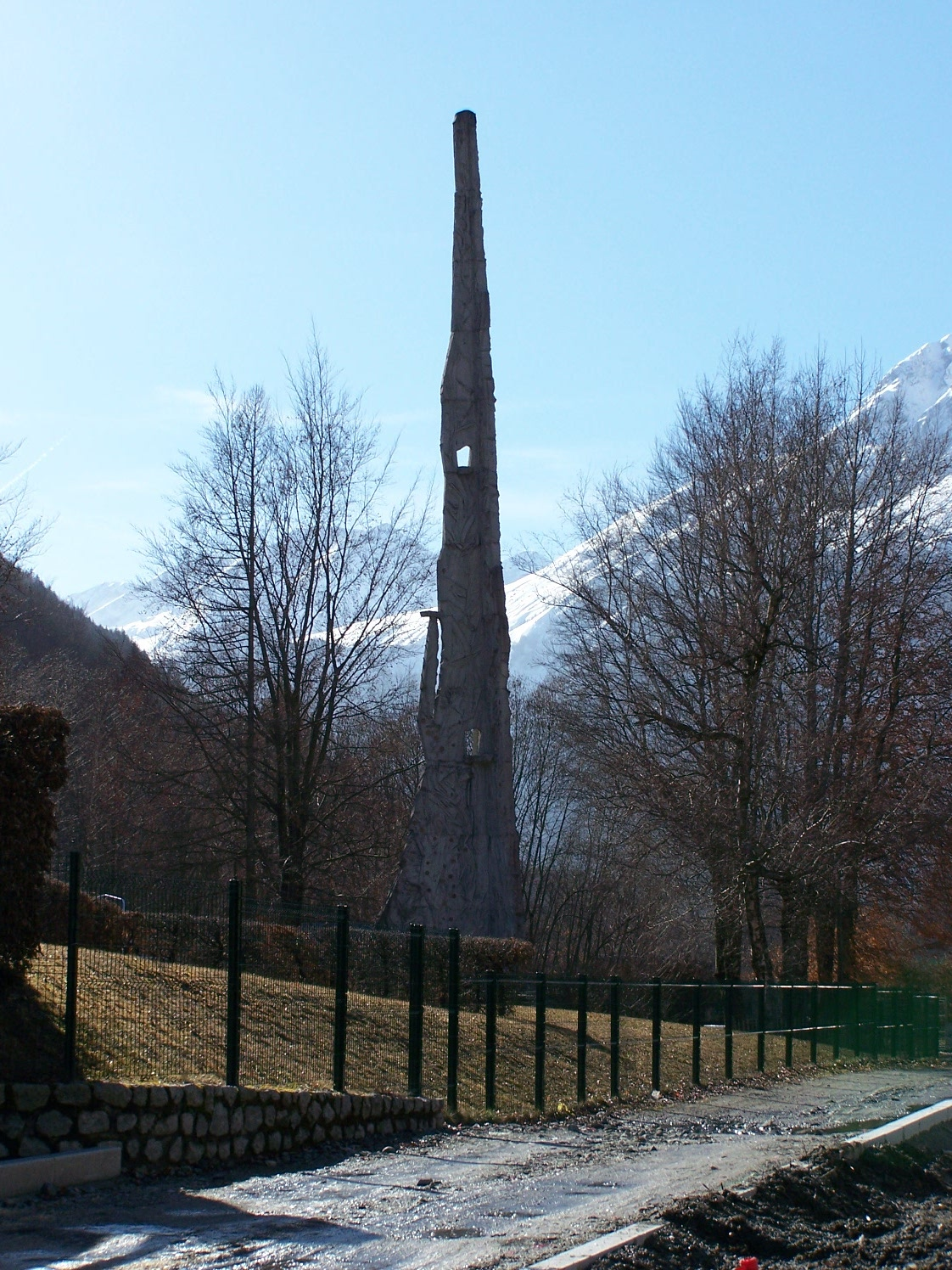
The Aiguille de l'Eau d'Olle, a climbing wall 30 metres high - the highest in Europe
- The Oven of faure
- The tower

== See also ==
- Communes of the Isère department
