= List of curling clubs in Germany =

This is a list of curling clubs in Germany within the German Curling Association:

- 1. Sächsischer Curlingverein Geising – Geising
- Eissport- und Schlittschuhclub 2007 Berlin e.V. – Berlin
- Curling Club Hamburg – Hamburg
- VERC Lauterbach – Schlitz
- Curling Club Düsseldorf – Düsseldorf
- Curling Club Wiehl – Gummersbach
- Curling Club Unna – Schwerte
- Curling Club Mannheim – Mannheim
- Curlingclub Eintracht Frankfurt – Schaafheim
- Baden Hills Golf & Curling Club – Rheinmünster
- Curling Club Schwenningen – Villingen-Schwenningen
- Curling Club Eiskristall Schwenningen – Villingen-Schwenningen
- Curling Club Konstanz – Konstanz
- Münchener Eislauf-Verein von 1883 e.V. – Munich
- Sportclub Riessersee – Garmisch-Partenkirchen
- Curling Club Mangfalltal – Bruckmühl
- Eissport-Club Oberstdorf – Oberstdorf
- Curling Club Füssen – Füssen
- Thüringer Curling-Verein Erfurt – Erfurt
- Curling Köln – Cologne
