= List of curling clubs in Turkey =

The following is the list of clubs in the 2024-25 season of the Turkish top two curling leagues:

Club	Place	Super League		First League	
Club	Place	Men's	Women's	Men's	Women's
Erzurum Curling Akademi S.K.	Erzurum	✓	✓		
Çelebi S.K.	Erzurum	✓	✓		✓
Kuzey Yamacı S.K.	Erzurum	✓	✓		
Narman 18 Mart S.K.	Erzurum	✓	✓		
Eco S.K.	Erzurum	✓	✓		
Çığ S.K.	Erzurum	✓	✓		
3200 Akademi S.K.	Erzurum	✓			✓
Erzurum Akdağ S.K.	Erzurum	✓			✓
Köyceğiz Göl ve Gençlik S.K.	Muğla	✓	✓		
Erzurum TEİAŞ S.K.	Erzurum		✓		
Erzurum Albayraklar S.K.	Erzurum		✓	✓	
Kar Beyaz S.K.	Erzurum			✓	✓
Erzurum Aile ve Sosyal Hizmetler S.K.	Erzurum			✓	
Tekirdağ Curling S.K.	Tekirdağ			✓	✓
Trabzon TEİAŞ S.K.	Trabzon			✓	✓
Karadam S.K.	Erzurum			✓	
Palandöken S.K.	Erzurum			✓	
Erzurum Büyükşehir Belediyesi S.K.	Erzurum			✓	
Eğriçayır S.K.	Erzurum			✓	
Kuzeyin Yıldızlar S.K.	Erzurum			✓	
Narman S.K.	Erzurum				✓
Samsun Gençlik S.K.	Samsun				✓
Kafkars S.K.	Kars				✓
1461 Curling S.K.	Trabzon				✓
Number of clubs	24	9	9	10	10

There are a total of 127 curling clubs in Turkey registered by the Turkish Curling Federation. Erzurum is the most important city having 43 curling clubs.
