= List of curling clubs in Norway =

This is a list of curling clubs in Norway:

- Bergen Curling Club - Bergen
- Brumunddal Curlingklubb - Brumunddal
- Bygdøy Curling Club - Oslo
- Bærum Curling Club - Oslo
- Christiansands Curling Club - Kristiansand
- Danmarksplasse Herre- og Kvinnecurling - Danmarksplass
- Furumo Curling Klubb - Geithus
- Halden Curling Club - Halden
- Hamar Curlingklubb - Hamar
- Larvik Curlingklubb - Larvik
- Lilleborg IK, Curlinggruppe - Eiksmarka
- Lillehammer Curlingklubb - Lillehammer
- Lørenskog Curlingklubb - Lørenskog
- Nærbø IL, Curling - Nærbø
- Oppdal Curlingklubb - Oppdal
- Oslo Curlingklubb - Lillestrøm
- Oslo Damecurling - Oslo
- Risenga Curlingklubb - Vettre
- Sarpsborg Curlingklubb - Sarpsborg
- Scheen Curling Klubb - Skien
- Snarøen Curling Club - Snarøya
- Stabekk Curlingklubb - Jar
- Toten CK - Bøverbru
- Trondheim Curlingklubb - Trondheim
- Vestkanten Curlingklubb - Bergen
- Øvre Holen Curlingforening - Laksevåg
