= Chlístov (Benešov District) =

- Municipality
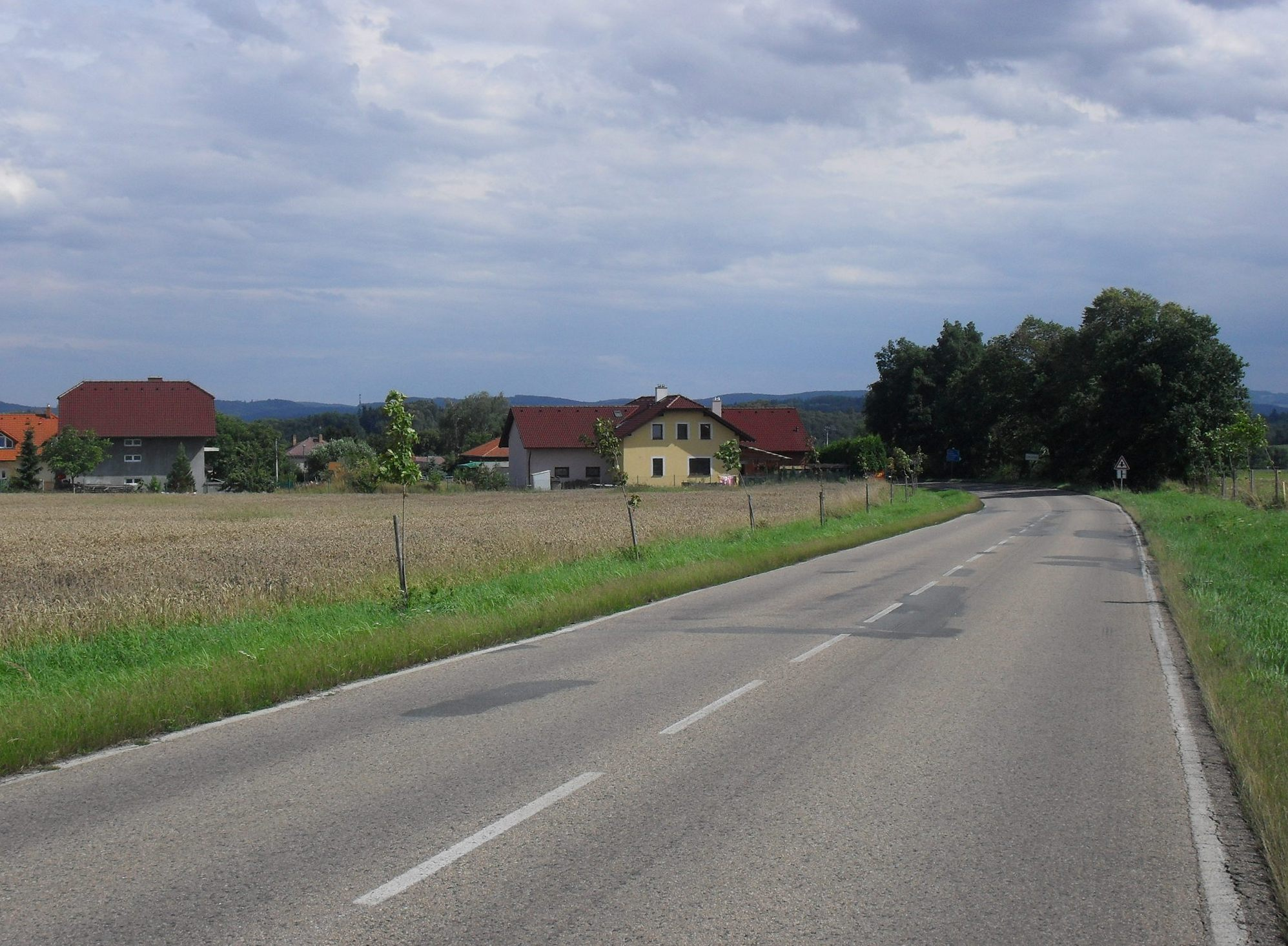
- View from the northwest

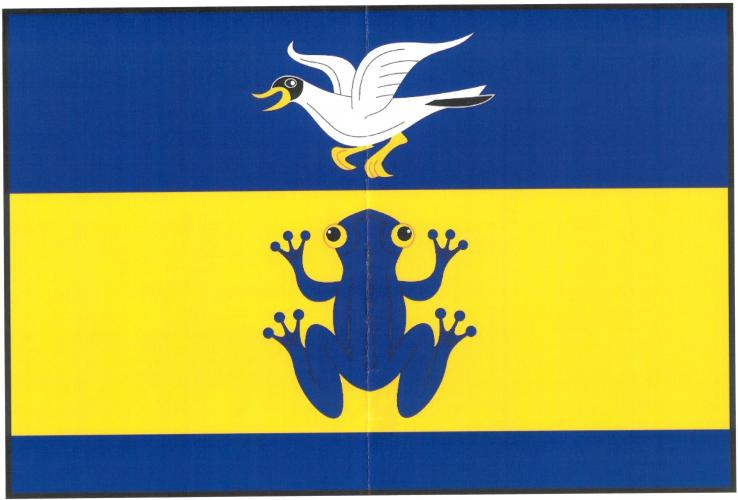
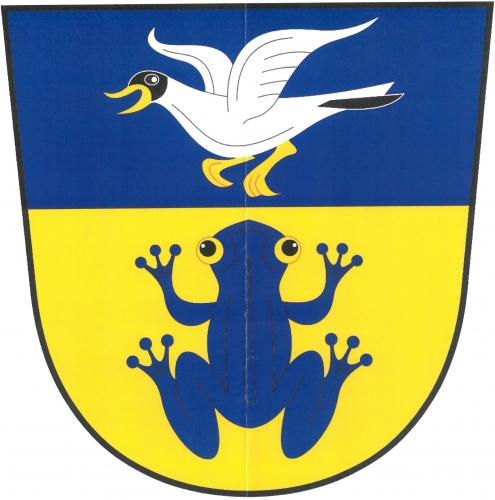
- Flag Coat of arms

- Location in the Czech Republic
- Coordinates: 49°48′6″N 14°39′17″E
- Country: Czech Republic
- Region: Central Bohemian
- District: Benešov
- First mentioned: 1342

Area
  - Total: 2.89 km^{2} (1.12 sq mi)
- Elevation: 369 m (1,211 ft)

Population (2026-01-01)
  - Total: 459
  - Density: 159/km^{2} (411/sq mi)
- Time zone: UTC+1 (CET)
  - Summer (DST): UTC+2 (CEST)
- Postal code: 256 01
- Website: www.chlistov.info

Chlístov is a municipality and village in Benešov District in the Central Bohemian Region of the Czech Republic. It has about 500 inhabitants.

== Administrative division ==
Chlístov consists of three municipal parts (in brackets population according to the 2021 census):

- Chlístov (128)
- Racek (140)
- Žabovřesky (162)

== Demographics ==
Historical population
Year	Pop.	±%
1869	142	—
1880	151	+6.3%
1890	151	+0.0%
1900	156	+3.3%
1910	142	−9.0%
1921	148	+4.2%
1930	157	+6.1%
1950	105	−33.1%
1961	302	+187.6%
1970	286	−5.3%
1980	247	−13.6%
1991	262	+6.1%
2001	229	−12.6%
2011	357	+55.9%
2021	430	+20.4%
Source: Censuses
