= Verny, Republic of Bashkortostan =

Verny Верный
- Village
- Location within Bashkortostan Location within Russia
- Coordinates: 54°43′N 56°19′E
- Country: Russia
- Region: Bashkortostan
- District: Iglinsky District
- Time zone: UTC+5:00

Verny (Russian: Верный) is a rural locality (a village) in Kaltymanovsky Selsoviet, Iglinsky District, Bashkortostan, Russia. The population was 91 as of 2010. There are 23 streets.

== Geography ==
Verny is located 18 km southwest of Iglino (the district's administrative centre) by road. Shaksha is the nearest rural locality.
