= List of curling clubs in Sweden =

This is a list of curling clubs in Sweden. They are organized by the Swedish Curling Association.

- Bodens CD - Boden
- Borlänge CC - Borlänge
- Borås CK - Borås
- Djursholms CK - Djursholm
- Falun CC - Falun
- Göinge CK - Broby
- CK Granit-Gävle - Gävle
- Göteborgs CK - Gothenburg
- Halmstad CK - Halmstad
- Hammarstrands CK - Hammarstrand
- Hede CK - Hede
- Helsingborgs CK - Helsingborg
- Härnösand CK - Härnösand
- Järpens CK - Järpen
- Jönköping CC - Jönköping
- Karlshamns CK - Karlshamn
- Carlskrona CC - Karlskrona
- Karlstads CK - Karlstad
- Kristinehamns CC - Kristinehamn
- Curla CK - Landskrona
- Leksands CK - Leksand
- Lindesbergs CK - Lindesberg
- Linköpings CK - Linköping
- Lits CC - Lit
- Ljusdal CK - Ljusdal
- Luleå CK - Luleå
- Malmö CK - Malmö
- Malung CC - Malung
- Mariestads CC - Mariestad
- Mjölby AI Curlingförening - Mjölby
- Norrköpings CK - Norrköping
- Nyköpings CK - Nyköping
- Nässjö CK - Nässjö
- Oskarshamns CC - Oskarshamn
- CK Silverstenen - Sala
- Skellefteå CK - Skellefteå
- Sollefteå CK - Sollefteå
- Sundbybergs Curlinghall - Sundbyberg
- Danderyds Curlinghall - Danderyd
- Djursholms CK - Stockholm
- Stocksunds CK - Stockholm
- Sundybergs CK - Stockholm
- Stallmästaregårdens CK - Stockholm
- Haga-Mariebergs CK - Stockholm
- Amatörföreningens CK - Stockholm
- Old Plaers CC - Sundsvall
- Sundsvalls CK - Sundsvall
- CK Skvadern - Sundsvall
- CK Wirgo - Strömsund
- Svegs CK - Sveg
- Södertälje CK - Södertälje
- Umeå CK - Umeå
- IK Fyris Curling - Uppsala
- Uppsala Curlinggille - Uppsala
- Bohuslänska CK - Uddevalla
- CK Vänersborg - Vänersborg
- Växjö CC - Växjö
- Åre CK - Åre
- Örebro CS - Örebro
- Örnsköldsviks CK - Örnsköldsvik
- Östersunds CK - Östersund
