= Grand'Maison Dam =

Grand'Maison ppp
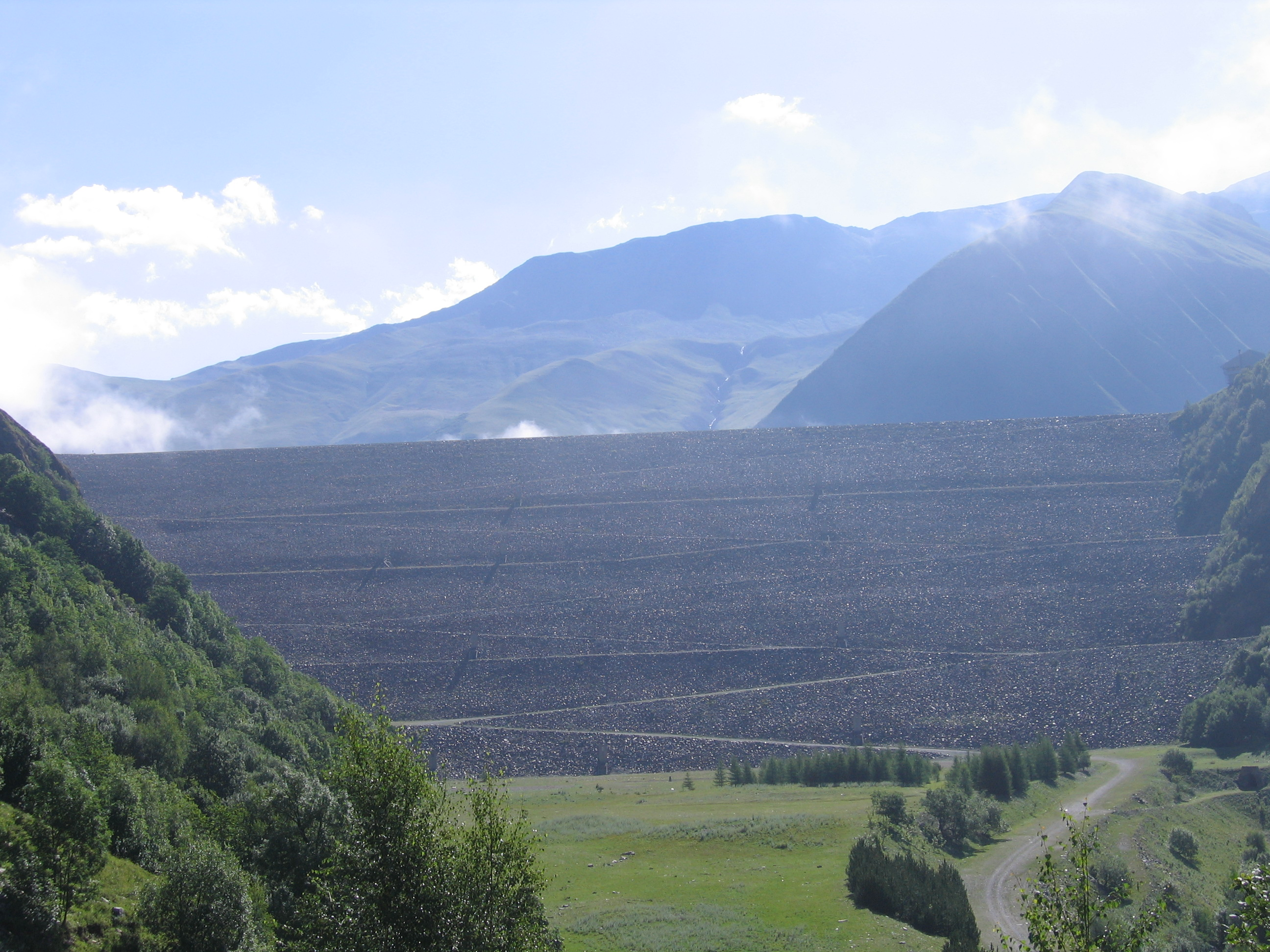

- Location within France
- Official name: Barrage de Grand'Maison
- Country: France
- Location: Vaujany, Isère
- Coordinates: 45°12′21″N 06°07′01″E
- Status: Operational
- Construction began: 1978
- Opening date: 1985
- Owner: Électricité de France (EDF)

Dam and spillways
- Impounds: Eau d'Olle
- Height (foundation): 160 m (525 ft)
- Height (thalweg): 140 m (459 ft)
- Length: 550 m (1,804 ft)
- Dam volume: 12,000,000 m^{3} (15,695,407 cu yd)

Reservoir
- Creates: Lac de Grand Maison
- Total capacity: 140,000,000 m^{3} (113,500 acre⋅ft)

Power Station
- Commission date: 1987
- Hydraulic head: 955 m (3,133 ft) (max, lower plant)
- Turbines: 4 x 150 MW Pelton-type; 8 x 150 MW Francis pump turbine
- Installed capacity: 1,800 MW
- Annual generation: 1,420 GWh

The Grand'Maison Dam is an embankment dam on L'Eau d'Olle, a tributary of the Romanche River. It is located in Vaujany of Isère within the French Alps. The primary purpose of the dam is to serve as the upper reservoir for a pumped-storage hydroelectric scheme where Lac du Verney located lower in the valley is the lower reservoir. The dam was constructed between 1978 and 1985 with its power station being commissioned in 1987. With an installed capacity of 1,800 MW, it is the largest hydroelectric power station in France.

== Design and operation ==
The Grand'Maison is an embankment dam with a height of 140 m (459 ft) from the riverbed and 160 m (525 ft) from foundation. It is 550 m (1,804 ft) long and has a fill volume of 12,000,000 m^{3} (15,695,407 cu yd). The reservoir withheld by the dam, Lac de Grand Maison, has a storage capacity of 140,000,000 m^{3} (113,500 acre⋅ft). The power generation process begins with water stored in its reservoir at an altitude of 1,698 m (5,571 ft). By means of a 7,100 m (23,294 ft) long head-race tunnel which splits into three 1,450 m (4,757 ft) long penstocks, water is sent down to the power station. It is located on the rear bank of Lac du Verney at 45°08′43″N 06°03′03″E which lies at an elevation of 770 m (2,526 ft). The power station has above-ground and below-ground levels. On the above-ground level, there are four 150 MW Pelton turbine-generators which are used for normal conventional hydroelectric power generation. The below-ground level contains eight 150 MW Francis pump turbines which can be used for both power generation and pumping. After electricity is generated, the water is discharged into Lac du Verney, the lower reservoir. When storage in Grand'Maison needs to be replenished, the turbines reverse into pumps and move water from Lac du Verney back to the Grand'Maison Reservoir. The change in elevation between the reservoirs afford the above-ground station a maximum hydraulic head of 920 m (3,018 ft) and the below-ground station 955 m (3,133 ft).

The power station repeats the pumped-storage process as needed and acts as a peaking power plant. Power generation or pumping can be initiated within minutes. On an annual basis, the power station generates 1,420 GWh of electricity and consumes 1,720 GWh in pumping mode. Because pumping occurs during periods of low demand when electricity is cheaper than power generation during those of high demand, the power station is profitable.

== See also ==
- List of pumped-storage hydroelectric power stations
- Renewable energy in France
