= List of curling clubs in Prince Edward Island =

Curling clubs in the Canadian province of Prince Edward Island are organized into the Curl PEI. The province has six clubs:

- Cornwall Curling Club - Cornwall
- Crapaud Community Curling Club - Crapaud
- Montague Curling Club - Montague
- Souris Curling Club - Souris
- Summerside Curling Club - Summerside
- West Prince Curling Club - Bloomfield

== Defunct clubs ==
The Charlottetown Curling Club was closed in 2021 when it was sold to the City of Charlottetown. As of 2023, there are plans to re-start the club in neighbouring Stratford.
