= Fallah Varney =

Liberian junta leader (1957–1981)

- Born: 7 April 1957; Korniadu
- Died: 27 January 1981 (aged 23); Highway between Monrovia and Paynesville
- Political party: People's Redemption Council

Fallah Varney was a Liberian soldier and one of the leaders of the People's Redemption Council, the military junta that ruled the country after a 1980 coup d'état. Born on 7 April 1957 at Korniadu in Lofa County, Varney attended schools run by the Firestone plantation. After finishing high school at the Charlotte Tolbert Memorial Academy in 1972, he enlisted in the Armed Forces of Liberia in 1974. He was promoted from private to private first class in 1975 and to corporal in 1979.

In the wake of the 12 April coup, he took the rank of lieutenant colonel and became the secretary general of the People's Redemption Council, as well as chairing the PRC's commerce and transportation committee. Varney held office for less than a year: on 27 January 1981, he was driving a car on the highway between Monrovia and Paynesville when his vehicle was involved in a head-on collision. The inmates of nearby houses rushed to the vehicles, but he was dead by the time the first person reached his car. Two days later, his body was transferred from a funeral home to the Capitol Rotunda, where he lay in state for another two days. On 1 February, his body was flown back to Lofa County: a funeral was held at the Voinjama airfield, after which it was returned to Korniadu for burial. Doe chose Abraham Kollie, the PRC deputy speaker, to succeed Varney as secretary general.

A member of the Episcopal Church of Liberia, Varney was married with two daughters. He was a grandson of a chieftain of the Kissi people and saw his participation in the PRC as an attempt to fight for the freedom of his ethnic group. Varney was buried in the Kolahun District, near his hometown of Korniadu. In 1983, Liberia issued a set of seven postage stamps celebrating the third anniversary of the coup; Varney was featured on the three-cent stamp in the set.
