= Žabovřesky nad Ohří =

- Municipality
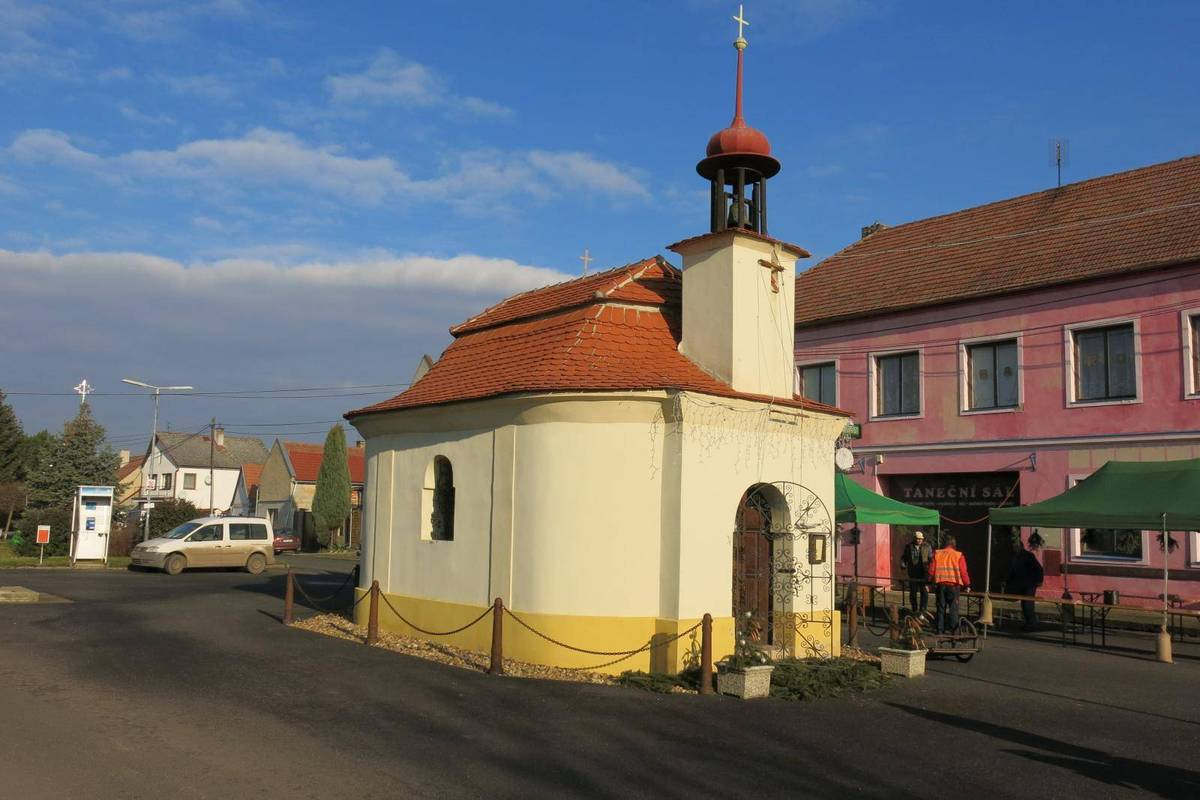
- Chapel in the centre of Žabovřesky nad Ohří

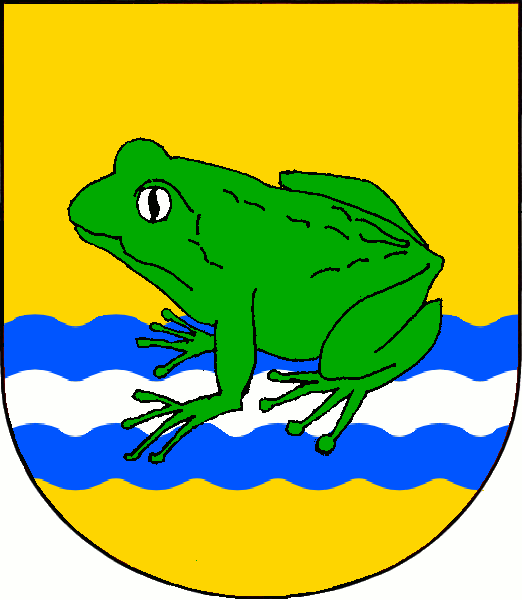
- Flag Coat of arms

- Location in the Czech Republic
- Coordinates: 50°24′48″N 14°5′28″E
- Country: Czech Republic
- Region: Ústí nad Labem
- District: Litoměřice
- First mentioned: 1336

Area
  - Total: 4.82 km^{2} (1.86 sq mi)
- Elevation: 160 m (520 ft)

Population (2026-01-01)
  - Total: 269
  - Density: 55.8/km^{2} (145/sq mi)
- Time zone: UTC+1 (CET)
  - Summer (DST): UTC+2 (CEST)
- Postal code: 410 02
- Website: zabovreskyno.cz

Žabovřesky nad Ohří is a municipality and village in Litoměřice District in the Ústí nad Labem Region of the Czech Republic. It has about 300 inhabitants.

== Etymology ==
The name Žabovřesky is derived from the Czech phrase žabí vřesky, meaning 'frog croaking' (but literally 'frog screaming').

== Geography ==
Žabovřesky nad Ohří is located about 14 kilometres (9 mi) south of Litoměřice and 40 km (25 mi) northwest of Prague. It lies in an agricultural landscape of the Lower Ohře Table. The highest point is at 221 m (725 ft) above sea level. The municipality is situated on the left bank of the Ohře River.

== History ==
The first written mention of Žabovřesky nad Ohří is in a deed of King John of Bohemia from 1336. Among the owners of the village were the noble families of Sternberg, Dietrichstein and Herbstein.

== Demographics ==
Historical population

Year	Pop.	±%
1869	336	—
1880	366	+8.9%
1890	335	−8.5%
1900	345	+3.0%
1910	339	−1.7%

Year	Pop.	±%
1921	364	+7.4%
1930	361	−0.8%
1950	278	−23.0%
1961	255	−8.3%
1970	227	−11.0%

Year	Pop.	±%
1980	196	−13.7%
1991	209	+6.6%
2001	212	+1.4%
2011	219	+3.3%
2021	268	+22.4%

Source: Censuses

== Transport ==
There are no railways or major roads passing through the municipality.

== Sights ==
The only protected cultural monument in the municipality is a late Baroque chapel from the end of the 18th century.

A tourist destination is the Simson Museum that presents various products made by the Simson company.
