= List of curling clubs in Yukon, the Northwest Territories and Nunavut =

This is a list of curling clubs in the Yukon, the Northwest Territories, and Nunavut, the three territories of Canada.

The three bodies that oversee curling in the territories are:

- Yukon Curling Association
- Northwest Territories Curling Association
- Nunavut Curling Association

== Northwest Territories ==
There are eight curling clubs in the Northwest Territories, four that play on artificial ice, and four on natural ice.

- Aklavik Curling Club - Aklavik (natural)
- Fort Simpson Curling Club - Fort Simpson (natural)
- Fort Smith Curling Club - Fort Smith (artificial)
- Fort McPherson Curling Club - Fort McPherson (natural)
- Hay River Curling Club - Hay River (artificial)
- Inuvik Curling Club - Inuvik (artificial)
- Norman Wells Curling Club - Norman Wells (natural)
- Yellowknife Curling Club - Yellowknife (artificial)

== Nunavut ==
- Iqaluit Curling Club - Iqaluit
- Qavik Curling Club - Rankin Inlet
- Ovayok Curling Club - Cambridge Bay

== Yukon ==
There are five curling clubs in the Yukon Curling Association:

- Atlin Curling Club - Atlin, British Columbia
- Carmacks Curling Club - Carmacks
- Dawson Curling Club - Dawson
- Mayo Curling Club - Mayo
- Whitehorse Curling Club - Whitehorse
