= Varney (given name) =

Varney is a given name. Notable people with the name include:

- Varney Anderson (1866–1941), American Major League Baseball pitcher
- Varney Monk (1892–1967), Australian pianist and composer
- Varney Parkes (1859–1935), Australian politician and architect
- Varney Sherman (born 1953), Liberian politician
