= Žabovřesky (České Budějovice District) =

- Municipality
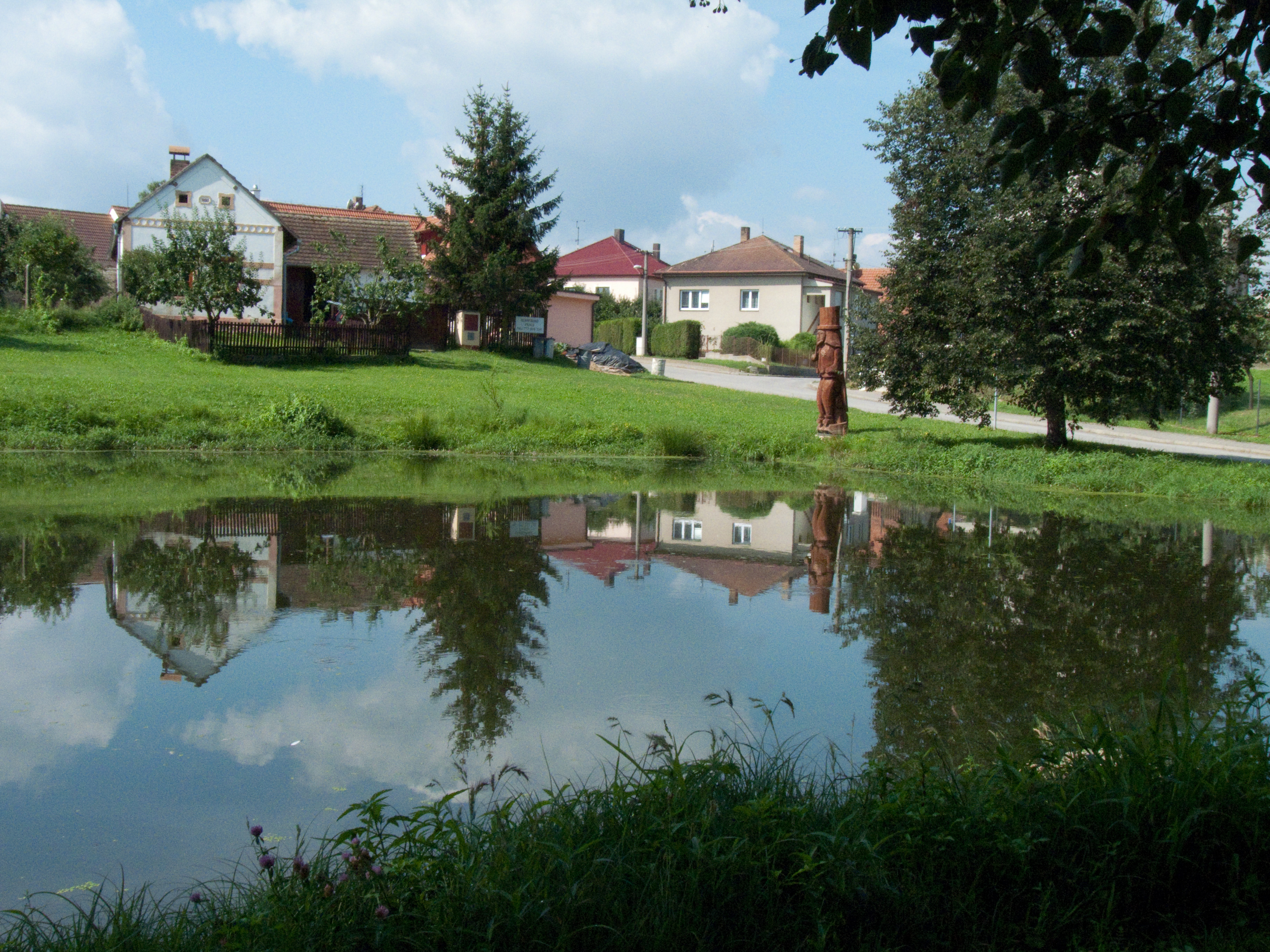
- Pond in the centre of Žabovřesky

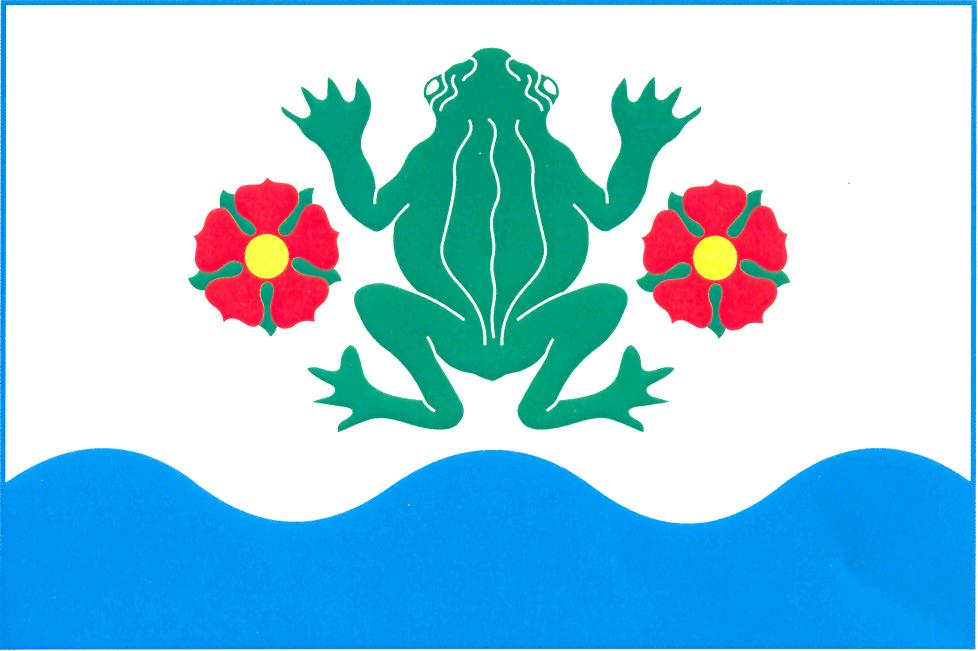
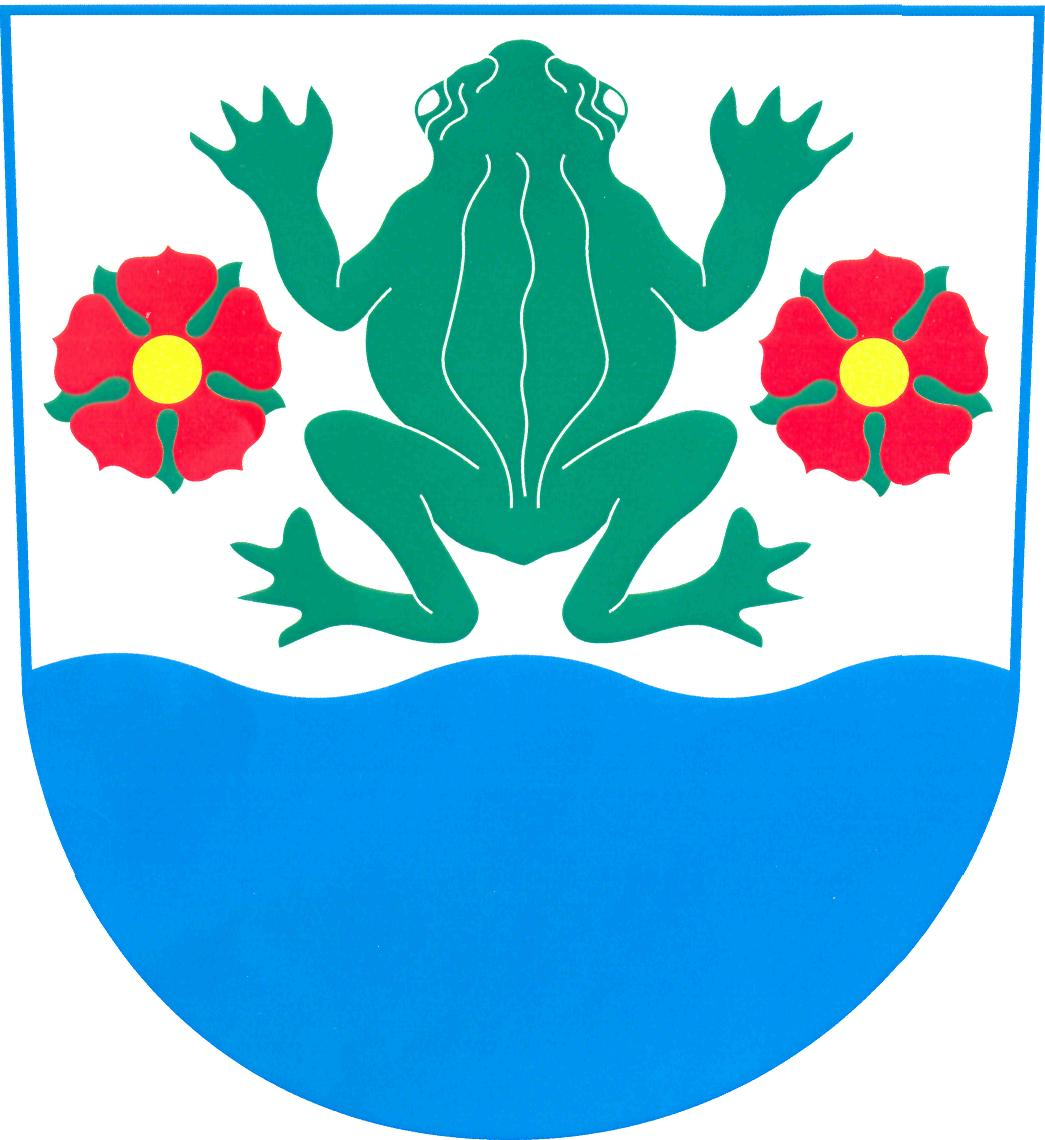
- Flag Coat of arms

- Location in the Czech Republic
- Coordinates: 49°0′10″N 14°20′6″E
- Country: Czech Republic
- Region: South Bohemian
- District: České Budějovice
- First mentioned: 1334

Area
  - Total: 11.84 km^{2} (4.57 sq mi)
- Elevation: 394 m (1,293 ft)

Population (2026-01-01)
  - Total: 454
  - Density: 38.3/km^{2} (99.3/sq mi)
- Time zone: UTC+1 (CET)
  - Summer (DST): UTC+2 (CEST)
- Postal code: 373 41
- Website: www.obeczabovresky.cz

Žabovřesky is a municipality and village in České Budějovice District in the South Bohemian Region of the Czech Republic. It has about 500 inhabitants.

Žabovřesky lies approximately 11 kilometres (7 mi) west of České Budějovice and 121 km (75 mi) south of Prague.

== Administrative division ==
Žabovřesky consists of two municipal parts (in brackets population according to the 2021 census):

- Žabovřesky (316)
- Dehtáře (114)

== Etymology ==
The name Žabovřesky is derived from the Czech phrase žabí vřesky, meaning 'frog croaking' (but literally 'frog screaming').

== Demographics ==
Historical population
Year	Pop.	±%
1869	461	—
1880	447	−3.0%
1890	511	+14.3%
1900	492	−3.7%
1910	495	+0.6%
1921	512	+3.4%
1930	504	−1.6%
1950	340	−32.5%
1961	325	−4.4%
1970	291	−10.5%
1980	324	+11.3%
1991	308	−4.9%
2001	383	+24.4%
2011	466	+21.7%
2021	430	−7.7%
Source: Censuses
