= World Curling =

International sport governing body for the sport of curling

- Formation: 1966; 60 years ago (as International Curling Federation)
- Type: Sports federation
- Headquarters: Perth, Scotland
- Members: 73 member associations
- Official language: English
- President: Beau Welling
- Staff: 20
- Website: worldcurling.org

World Curling, formerly the World Curling Federation (WCF) is the world governing body for curling accreditation, with offices in Perth, Scotland. It was formed out of the International Curling Federation (ICF), when the push for Olympic Winter Sport status was made. The name was changed in 1990 to the WCF and then to World Curling in 2024.

The ICF was initially formed in 1966 as a committee of the Royal Caledonian Curling Club in Perth after the success of the Scotch Cup series of world championships held between Canada and Scotland. At the outset, it comprised the associations of Scotland, Canada, Sweden, Norway, Switzerland, and the United States. In the wake of its formation, it sanctioned the World Curling Championships. World Curling currently sanctions 15 international curling events (see below). World Curling is managed by eight Board Directors, one president, three vice-presidents (one from each World Curling regional zone - Americas, Europe, Pacific-Asia) and six Board Directors. The six Board Directors must all come from different member associations. All positions on the Board of Directors are elected by World Curling member associations. The Board of Directors are supported by and a permanent staff of 20 employees.

There are 74 member associations, with the most recent addition being Pakistan, Puerto Rico and the Philippines in 2023, and Monaco in 2024.

In reaction to the 2022 Russian invasion of Ukraine, in March 2022 World Curling banned the Russian Curling Federation from competing.

== Goals ==
The World Curling mission statement reads: "To lead the worldwide curling community through the promotion and development of our sport, our culture and our values."

The purpose and aims of World Curling are as follows:

1. To represent curling internationally and to facilitate growth of the sport throughout the world
2. To promote co-operation and mutual understanding amongst Member Associations and to unite curlers throughout the world
3. To Defend and Further the interests of world curling
4. To conduct world curling competitions
5. To formulate rules of the sport of curling for world competitions and all other competitions approved by World Curling

== Member associations ==
Members of World Curling and its regional divisions as of August 2024. Green represents the Americas zone, Blue represents the Europe zone, and Purple represents the Pacific-Asia zone.

Following is a list of member associations of World Curling:

Year	Name	Country	World Curling zone
2017	Afghanistan Curling Federation	Afghanistan	Pacific-Asia
1991	Andorra Curling Association	Andorra	Europe
2025	Argentinian Curling Association	Argentina	Americas
1986	Australian Curling Federation	Australia	Pacific-Asia
1982	Österreichischer Curling Verband	Austria	Europe
1997	Belarusian Curling Association	Belarus	Europe
2005	Belgian Curling Association	Belgium	Europe
2020	Bolivian Curling Federation	Bolivia	Americas
2022	Bosnia and Herzegovina Curling Association	Bosnia and Herzegovina	Europe
1998	Brazilian Ice Sports Federation	Brazil	Americas
2013	Bulgarian Curling Federation	Bulgaria	Europe
1966	Curling Canada	Canada	Americas
2002	Chinese Curling Association	China	Pacific-Asia
1998	Chinese Taipei Curling Federation	Chinese Taipei	Pacific-Asia
2004	Croatian Curling Association	Croatia	Europe
1990	Czech Curling Association	Czechia	Europe
1971	Danish Curling Association	Denmark	Europe
2019	Dominican Republic winter sports federation	Dominican Republic	Americas
1971	English Curling Association	England	Europe
2003	Estonian Curling Association	Estonia	Europe
1979	Finnish Curling Association	Finland	Europe
1966	French Ice Sports Federation	France	Europe
2013	Georgian Curling Federation	Georgia	Europe
1967	Deutscher Curling-Verband	Germany	Europe
2003	Hellenic Curling Association	Greece	Europe
2016	Guyana Curling Federation	Guyana	Americas
2014	Curling Sports Federation of Hong Kong China	Hong Kong, China	Pacific-Asia
1989	Hungarian Curling Federation	Hungary	Europe
1991	Icelandic Sport Federation	Iceland	Europe
2019	Curling Federation of India	India	Pacific-Asia
2003	Irish Curling Association	Ireland	Europe
2013	Israel Curling Federation	Israel	Europe
1972	Italian Ice Sports Federation	Italy	Europe
2022	Curling Jamaica	Jamaica	Americas
1985	Japan Curling Association	Japan	Pacific-Asia
2003	Kazakhstan Curling Association	Kazakhstan	Pacific-Asia
2021	Kenya Curling Federation	Kenya	Pacific-Asia
1994	Korean Curling Association	Korea	Pacific-Asia
2012	Kosovo Curling Federation	Kosovo	Europe
2019	Kuwait Winter Games Club	Kuwait	Pacific-Asia
2017	Curling Federation of the Kyrgyz Republic	Kyrgyzstan	Pacific-Asia
2001	Latvian Curling Association	Latvia	Europe
1991	Liechtenstein Curling Association	Liechtenstein	Europe
2003	Lithuanian Curling Association	Lithuania	Europe
1976	Curling Luxembourg	Luxembourg	Europe
2024	Monegasque Skating Federation	Monaco	Europe
2016	Federacion Mexicana de Curling	Mexico	Americas
2012	Mongolian Curling Federation	Mongolia	Pacific-Asia
1975	Netherlands Curling Association	Netherlands	Europe
1991	New Zealand Curling Association	New Zealand	Pacific-Asia
2018	Nigeria Curling Federation	Nigeria	Pacific-Asia
1966	Norwegian Curling Association	Norway	Europe
2023	Pakistan Curling Federation	Pakistan	Pacific-Asia
2023	Curling Pilipinas	Philippines	Pacific-Asia
2022	Polish Curling Clubs Federation (Note: The Polish Curling Association was suspended for not resolving disputes within Poland's ministry of sport and the Polish Curling Association governance structures. It was replaced by the Polish Curling Clubs Federation in 2022.)	Poland	Europe
2017	Winter Sports Federation of Portugal	Portugal	Europe
2023	Puerto Rico Curling Association	Puerto Rico	Americas
2014	Qatar Curling Federation	Qatar	Pacific-Asia
2010	Romanian Curling Federation	Romania	Europe
1992	Russian Curling Federation	Russia	Europe
2017	Kingdom Curling Association	Saudi Arabia	Pacific-Asia
1966	Royal Caledonian Curling Club	Scotland	Europe
2005	National Curling Association of Serbia	Serbia	Europe
2003	Slovak Curling Association	Slovakia	Europe
2010	Slovenian Curling Association	Slovenia	Europe
1999	Spanish Ice Sports Federation	Spain	Europe
1966	Swedish Curling Association	Sweden	Europe
1966	Swiss Curling Association	Switzerland	Europe
2022	Thai Curling Association	Thailand	Pacific-Asia
2009	Turkish Ice Skating Federation	Türkiye	Europe
2020	Curling Federation of Turkmenistan	Turkmenistan	Pacific-Asia
2013	Ukrainian Curling Federation	Ukraine	Europe
1966	United States Curling Association	United States of America	Americas
1991	US Virgin Islands Curling Association	U.S. Virgin Islands	Americas
1982	Welsh Curling Association	Wales	Europe

=== Former member associations ===
Years	Name	Country	WCF zone
2008–2014	Armenia Curling Federation (Note: The Armenia Curling Federation was suspended for failure to pay subscriptions, and later expelled.)	Armenia	Europe
2003–2021	Polish Curling Association	Poland	Europe

== Executive board ==
The current executive board as of June 2024 is as follows:

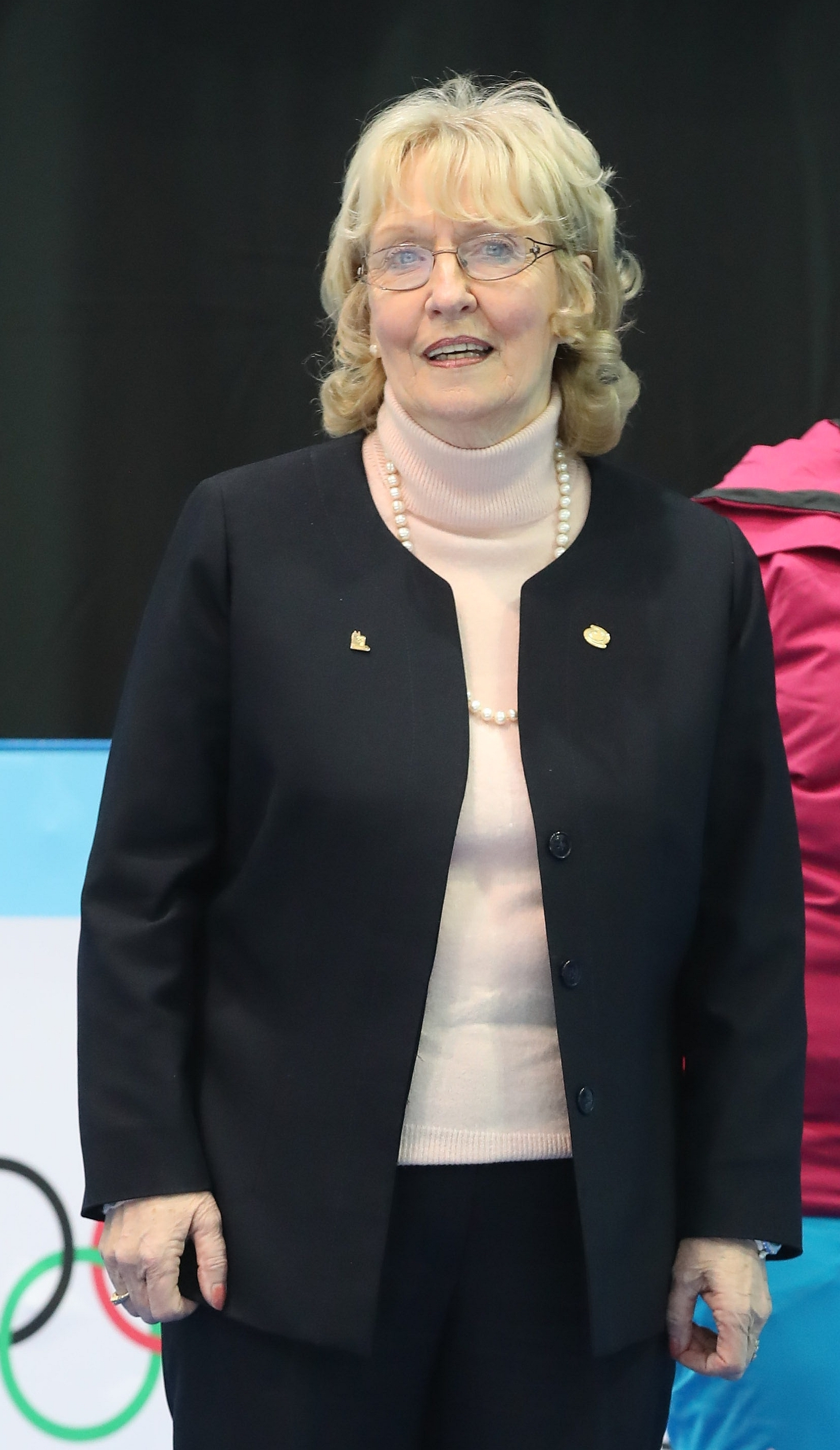
Kate Caithness, former president of the World Curling Federation

President: Beau Welling (United States)
Vice Presidents:

Kim Forge (Australia)
Morten Soegaard (Norway)

Board of Directors:

David Sik (Czech Republic)
Helena Lingham (Sweden)
Sergio Mitsuo Vilela (Brazil)
Robin Niven (Scotland)
Jill Officer (Canada)

Athlete Commission Chair: Tyler George (Canada)

=== Former presidents ===
Former presidents of the WCF and ICF are listed below:

President	Member association	Years in office
Presidents of the ICF
Major Allan Cameron	Scotland	1966–1969
Brigadier Colin A. Campbell	Canada	1969–1979
Sven A. Eklund	Sweden	1979–1982
G. Clifton Thompson	Canada	1982–1985
Philip Dawson	Scotland	1985–1988
Dr. Donald F. Barcome	United States	1988–1990
Presidents of the WCF
Günther Hummelt	Austria	1990–2000
Roy Sinclair	Scotland	2000–2006
Les Harrison	Canada	2006–2010
Kate Caithness	Scotland	2010–2022

== Competitions and championships ==
World Curling manages many events around the world.

Event	Description
International championships
Olympic Winter Games (OWG)	For ten men's, women's, and mixed doubles teams.
Paralympic Winter Games (PWG)	For ten mixed teams and eight mixed doubles teams.
Youth Olympic Games (YOG)	For sixteen mixed doubles teams.
World Men's Curling Championship (WMCC)	For eighteen men's teams.
World Women's Curling Championship (WWCC)	For eighteen women's teams.
World Mixed Doubles Curling Championship (WMDCC)	For twenty mixed doubles teams.
World Wheelchair Curling Championship (WWhCC)	For twelve mixed teams.
World Wheelchair Mixed Doubles Curling Championship (WWhMDCC)	Open entry: one team may enter from each Member Association.
World Junior Curling Championships (WJCC)	For sixteen junior men's, women's and mixed doubles teams.
World Mixed Curling Championship (WMxCC)	Open entry: one team may enter from each Member Association.
World Senior Curling Championships (WSCC)	Open entry: one team from each gender may enter from each Member Association. The players must not be less than 50 years of age.
Qualification events
Olympic Qualification Event (OQE)	For men's and women's teams from National Olympic Committees previously qualified for World Curling Championships but not already qualified for the Olympic Winter Games.
World Mixed Doubles Qualification Event (WMDQE)	For mixed doubles teams from member associations not already qualified for the World Mixed Doubles Curling Championship.
World Wheelchair-B Curling Championship (WWhBCC)	For mixed gender teams from member associations not already qualified for the World Wheelchair Curling Championship.
World Junior-B Curling Championships (WJBCC)	For junior men's, women's and mixed doubles teams from member associations not already qualified for the World Junior Curling Championships.
Regional championships
European Curling Championships (ECC)	For twelve men's and women's teams from the European zone.
Defunct events
Curling World Cup	For eight men's, women's, and mixed doubles teams, consisting of three legs and a Grand Final.
Pacific-Asia Junior Curling Championships (PJCC)	For junior men's and women's teams from the Pacific Zone; acts as qualification to the WJCC. Replaced by World Junior-B Curling Championships.
European Junior Curling Challenge (EJCC)	For junior men's and women's teams from the European zone that have not already qualified for WJCC. Replaced by World Junior-B Curling Championships.
Americas Challenge	For men's and women's teams from the defunct Americas zone, only if the second-ranked member association from the Americas zone is challenged. Replaced by Pan-Continental Curling Championship.
Pacific-Asia Curling Championships (PACC)	For men's and women's teams from the defunct Pacific-Asia zone. Replaced by the Pan-Continental Curling Championship.
World Qualification Event (WQE)	For eight men's and women's teams from member associations not already qualified for the World Curling Championships.
Pan Continental Curling Championships (PCCC)	For men's and women's teams from the Pan Continental Zone. Replaced by the World Curling Championships B and C Divisions.

== Partners ==
=== Current ===
Sponsor
- BKT
- Goldline
- Hardline
- Le Gruyère AOP

=== Previous ===
Sponsor

== See also ==
- World Curling Rankings
- WCF Hall of Fame
