= Nuclear power in Belgium =

Belgium nuclear power plants (view)
Active plants
Closed plants

Belgium has two nuclear power plants operating with a net capacity of 2,085 MWe. Electricity consumption in Belgium has increased slowly since 1990, and in 2016, nuclear power provided 51.3%, 41 TWh per year, of the country's electricity.

The country's first commercial nuclear power plant began operating in 1974. Belgium decided to phase out nuclear power generation completely by 2025. In March 2022, due to the Russian invasion of Ukraine, Belgium decided to postpone closing of two reactors by 10 additional years.

In 2025, the Belgian parliament voted to drop the phaseout of nuclear energy, and to further postpone closing the existing reactors, as well as potentially building new reactors. In 2025, nuclear power produced 34% of the country’s electricity.

== History ==
Belgium has a long industrial history in the nuclear sector. Biraco in Olen, which regularly hosted Marie and Pierre Curie, was at the start of the industrial production of radium in 1922.

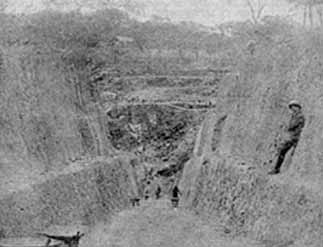
Open cut mine Shinkolobwe by Jadotville (today Likasi) in 1920s, men with wheelbarrows pushing ore while an overseer looks on ("Chalux" 1925)

The uranium ore used was discovered in 1913 in Katanga in then Belgian Congo by Union Minière du Haut-Katanga. The ore found in the Shinkolobwe mine was exceptionally rich. Even before World War II the United States expressed interest, and in 1942 when they required uranium for the Manhattan Project, Belgium was one of the few countries with a reasonable stock of uranium ore, and Edgar Sengier struck a deal. For the following decade Belgium, through Belgian Congo, was one of the main suppliers of uranium to the United States. This trade relationship resulted in Belgium being granted access to nuclear technology for civil purposes. In 1952, this led to establishing SCK•CEN, a study center for nuclear research in Mol. The first reactor BR1 (Belgian Reactor 1) became critical in 1956. Construction of BR2 started the following year. The BR2 reactor is one of the five main reactors producing molybdenum-99 that decays to technetium-99m, the radioisotope used in more than 80% of diagnostic imaging procedures in nuclear medicine.

In 1954, Belgium was one of the founding members of CERN, and three years later it was one of the original signatories of the Euratom Treaty.

In 1957, a site in Dessel, near SCK•CEN, was chosen as the location for Eurochemic. Thirteen OECD countries (Germany, France, Belgium, Italy, Sweden, The Netherlands, Switzerland, Denmark, Austria, Norway, Turkey, Portugal, Spain) joined forces to build a pilot nuclear reprocessing installation. The atoomwijk, a housing project for workers on private land near the site, was a scientific village unique in Europe at the time.

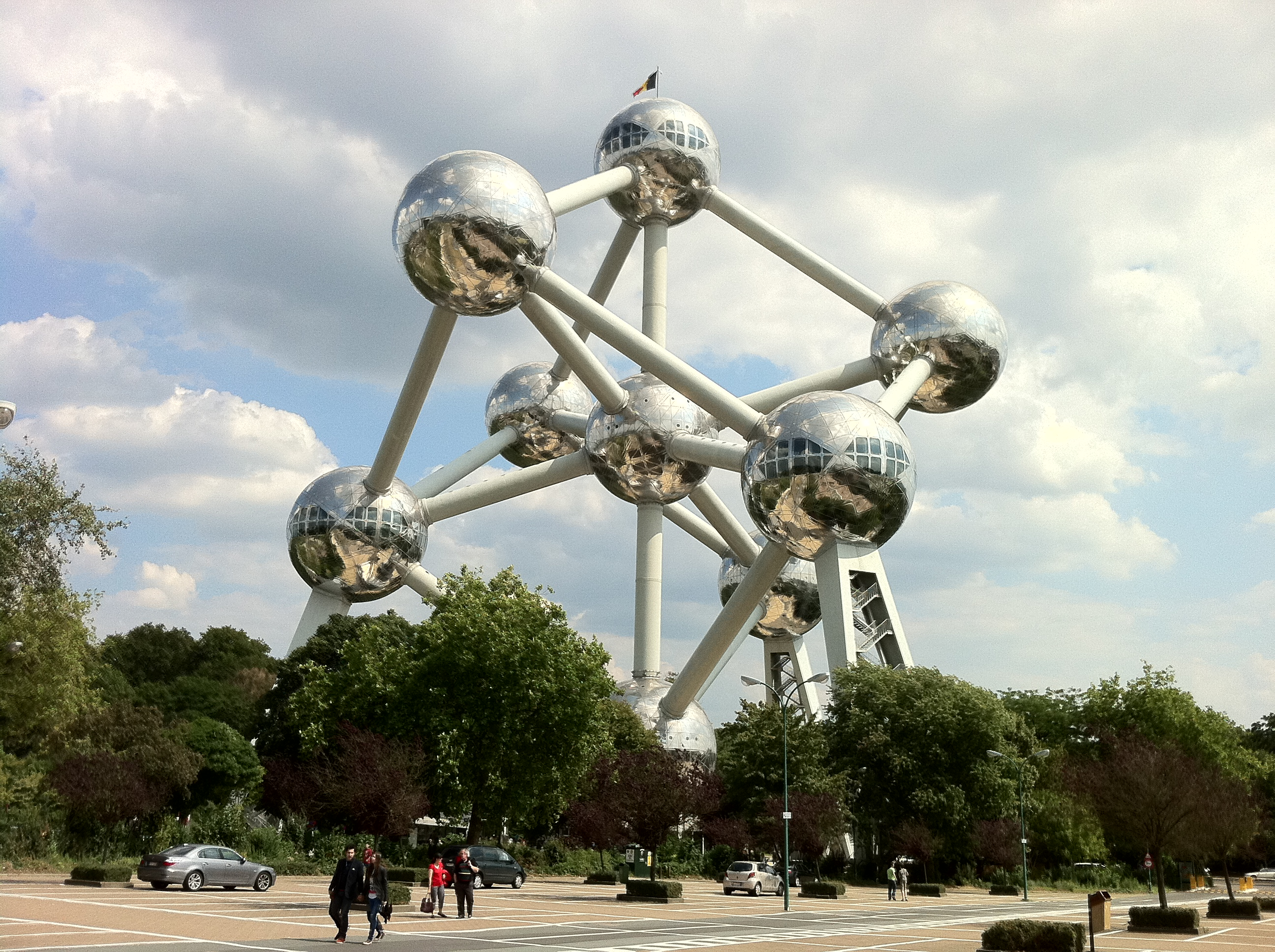
The Atomium in Brussels

In 1958, the Brussels World's Fair Expo 58 was to be powered by BR3. The reactor was to be built in Brussels, and open to visitors. Ultimately safety concerns and administrative problems moved the reactor to the SCK•CEN site. The other iconic symbol of the interest in nuclear technology at the time, the Atomium, housed a photo exhibition.

In 1959, the Trico Center was established in Kinshasa. Its TRICO I research reactor was the first nuclear reactor on the African continent.

The US-built BR3 was connected to the grid in 1962, making it the first pressurized water reactor in Western Europe.

SCK•CEN played a key role in developing MOX fuel. In 1960, near the same site, NV Belgonuclaire, a joint venture between SCK•CEN, Electrabel and Tractebel received its first plutonium from the United States, with the goal of industrially producing MOX fuel. In 1963 BR3 was loaded with MOX fuel and was the first reactor in the world to generate electricity this way.

In 1967, the commercial Chooz-A plant in France, close to the Belgian border, was connected to the grid. It had been constructed by a French-Belgian joint venture Sena (Société d'énergie nucléaire Franco-belge des Ardennes) to house a French-Belgian prototype pressurized water reactor, the first one built in Western Europe. It was jointly operated and delivered electricity to both countries.

In 1972, Belgium, the Netherlands, and Germany participated in building the failed SNR-300 fast breeder reactor. In 1973, Belgium and four other European countries formed Eurodif.

The first commercial nuclear power plant in Belgium, Doel 1, came into service in 1974. Six more reactors were connected to the grid during the following ten years. Plans for an eighth reactor were scrapped, instead utilities Electrabel and SPE took a 25% participation in the French Chooz-B nuclear power plant.

In 1974, Eurochemics ceased reprocessing. In 1987 BR3 was the first pressurized water reactor to be shut down in Europe. Decommissioning BR3 and Eurochemic has given Belgium significant expertise in the decommissioning of nuclear sites.

Belgium is currently preparing to contribute to Generation IV reactor research through the MYRRHA project.

== Nuclear power plants ==
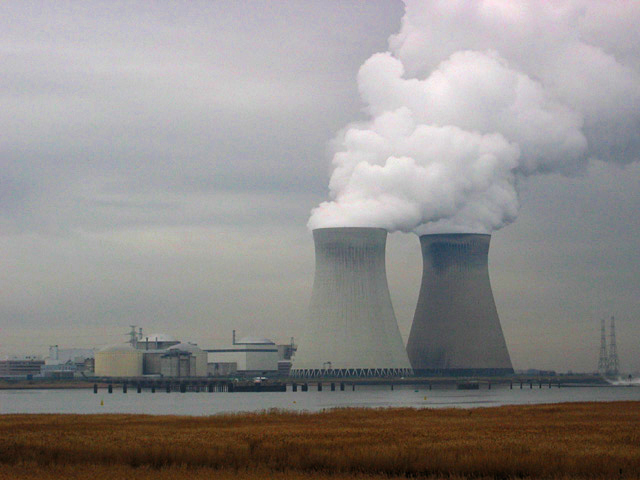
Doel Nuclear Power Station near Antwerp

There are two commercial nuclear power plants operational with seven reactors:

- Doel Nuclear Power Station on the Scheldt river, near the port of Antwerp, and
- Tihange Nuclear Power Station on the Meuse.

Both stations are operated by Electrabel.

Dessel is home to two sites for the production of nuclear fuel. One operated by FBFC, the other is being decommissioned and belonged to the Belgonucleaire company.

There are several test reactors at the SCK•CEN site in Mol. The Thetis research reactor of Ghent University is being decommissioned, and has had its fuel removed from site. None of these research reactors supply electricity to the grid.

The French nuclear power plant in Chooz is 3 kilometres (1.9 mi) from the Belgian border and surrounded on three sides by Belgian territory. The area around the power plant is subject to the same precautions as if there was a Belgian nuclear installation in the center.

Plant name	Unit No.	Type	Model	Status	Capacity (MW)	Begin building	Commercial operation	Closed
SCK•CEN	1	PWR	Westinghouse (WH) BR-3	Decommissioned	10	1 Nov 1957	10 Oct 1962	30 Jun 1987
Doel	1	PWR	WH 2 loops	Shut down	445	1 Jul 1969	15 Feb 1975	14 Feb 2025
Doel	2	PWR	WH 2 loops	Shut down	445	1 Sep 1971	1 Dec 1975	30 Nov 2025
Doel	3	PWR	Framatome 3 loops	Shut down	1006	1 Jan 1975	1 Oct 1982	23 Sep 2022
Doel	4	PWR	Belgian firms plus WH 3 loops	Operational	1039	1 Dec 1978	1 Jul 1985	(1 Nov 2035)
Tihange	1	PWR	Framatome 3 loops	Shut down	962	1 Jun 1970	1 Oct 1975	1 Oct 2025
Tihange	2	PWR	Framatome 3 loops	Shut down	1008	1 Apr 1976	1 Jun 1983	31 Jan 2023
Tihange	3	PWR	Belgian firms plus WH 3 loops	Operational	1046	1 Nov 1978	1 Sep 1985	(1 Nov 2035)

== Waste ==
=== Past ===
Belgium is one of the thirteen countries who have dumped radioactive waste in the ocean. This practise was permanently halted in 1982.

Prior to parliament placing a moratorium on nuclear reprocessing in 1993, 670 tonnes of spent fuel from the commercial reactors was processed in La Hague, France. The last return transport of highly radioactive waste, mainly fission products, took place in 2007. Other types of waste will be returning from La Hague to Belgium until 2019. Spent fuel from the BR2 reactor at SCK•CEN was reprocessed in Dounreay, Scotland.

=== Current situation ===
A national agency is responsible for radioactive waste management(ONDRAF/NIRAS), including transport, treatment, conditioning, storage, and disposal. The main disposal facility is the Belgoprocess (subsidiary of ONDRAF/NIRAS) site close to the towns of Mol and Dessel, which stores short-lived intermediate-level waste and high-level waste. Several shipments of reprocessed Belgian spent fuel, from France and Scotland, have also arrived at the Mol-Dessel site. This site offers interim storage on the surface.

Synatom, the Electrabel subsidiary that manages the fuel cycle for the commercial power plants, stores spent nuclear fuel on site before it is transferred over to ONDRAF/NIRAS. The commercial reactors produce 120 tonnes of highly radioactive spent fuel annually. In Doel it is stored dry in containers, in Tihange a spent fuel pool is used.

=== Long-term plans ===
For low and intermediate-level waste with a short half-life (less than 30 years) the cAt project was chosen in 2006. This entails encasing the waste in modular concrete boxes which will be stacked inside structures resembling tumuli in Dessel. The site is to be actively monitored for 300 years, after which the radioactivity of the waste will have decreased by a factor 1,000. A test version was built in 2011, and the project is awaiting final licensing.

ONDRAF/NIRAS and SCK•CEN run the HADES underground laboratory through EIG EURIDICE (European Underground Research Infrastructure for Disposal of nuclear waste In Clay Environment). Since 1980 this laboratory is researching if layers of clay as found in the North-East of Belgium could be used for permanent storage of nuclear waste.

In September 2011 ONDRAF/NIRAS fulfilled its legal obligation of publishing a Waste Plan. The 255-page document evaluates all proposed methods of disposal and concludes by recommending storage in the aforementioned layers of clay. The final decision is a political one. No permanent storing is expected to take place prior to 2040.

In August 2018, newspaper Le Soir revealed ONDRAF/NIRAS estimates that the option of long-term deep-burying high-level radioactive waste would not cost €3.2 billion, but rather €8 to €10 billion. This is because it is now considered more adequate to bury the waste at a depth of 400 metres instead of the previously determined 200 metres. Legally, the nuclear plants' private owners, mainly Electrabel, are set to pay for this through the Synatom-managed phase-out fund.

=== Effluent ===
Nuclear power stations also produce liquid and gaseous effluent. Nuclear effluent contains less radioactivity over a larger volume and is dispersed into the environment.

The Federal Agency for Nuclear Control (FANC) estimates the maximum impact of the Doel site at 0.02 mSv per year, and the maximum impact of the Tihange site at 0.05 mSv per year. The legal limit of exposure of the public to radiation from artificial sources is 1 mSv per year. By comparison, the exposure to radiation during one transatlantic flight is 0.08 mSv and a CT scan of the chest is about 6.6 mSv (per scan and not per year, as those are cumulative).

The liquid effluent from the Doel and Tihange sites are discharged into the Scheldt and Meuse rivers. There is no river near the Mol-Dessel sites. Its effluent is discharged via a 10 kilometres (6.2 mi) pipeline into the small river Molse Nete. Which suffers from historical pollution.

== Phase-out ==
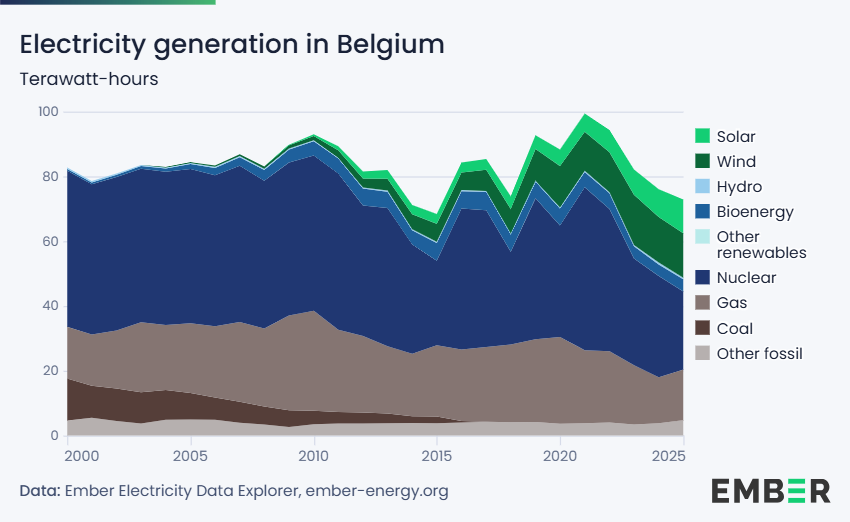
Electricity generation in Belgium in terawatt-hours (nuclear in dark blue)

In 1999 the policy statement of the Verhofstadt I Government (a coalition including the green parties Groen! and Ecolo) introduced a plan to phase-out nuclear power generation. The following year a government appointed commission reported that nuclear power was important to Belgium and recommended further development. Nevertheless, in 2003 near the end of its term Belgium's government passed phase-out legislation. It stipulates that no new commercial reactors are to be built and that Belgium's seven reactors would be shut down when they reach an operational lifetime of 40 years. All reactors reach this age in the period 2015–2025. When the law was being passed, there was speculation it would be overturned again as soon as an administration without the green parties was in power. A report published in 2005 by the Federal Planning Bureau noted that in many parts of Belgium nuclear power makes up more than 50% of the electricity generated. It would therefore be difficult for Belgium to adhere to the emissions targets of the Kyoto Protocols without nuclear power. In 2007, the Belgian Commission on Energy said that the use of nuclear energy is imperative to meet CO_{2} requirements and maintain economic stability. Furthermore, the commission believed that energy prices would double without the use of nuclear energy. The commission finally recommended that the operating lives of the seven nuclear power plants should be extended. The International Energy Agency stated in 2011 that the Belgian government should reconsider the nuclear phase-out policy.

In 2009, based on the GEMIX report, the government decided to extend the lifetimes of the three oldest nuclear power plants until 2025. In exchange, the owners would be charged an extra €215–245 million (about US$340 million) per year. This was not yet finalized into law when in 2010 the government resigned over unrelated issues. It was considered to be a formality, that would be taken care of when a new government was formed. However a prolonged period of political instability, without a government being formed, followed. The decision was pushed back further after the Fukushima nuclear disaster happened in March 2011. The caretaker government then decided to postpone any debate or decision in the matter until after the results of a European stress-test of the facilities were known.

A couple of months prior to these results being published however the new government decided in July 2012 that only Tihange 1's lifetime would be extended to 2025. The two oldest units at the Doel site (Doel 1 and Doel 2) were set to be closed in 2015. Their lifetime was however extended until 2025. The remaining Belgian nuclear power plants Doel 3 is set to be closed down in 2022, Tihange 2 in 2023 and Doel 4 and Tihange 3 in 2025.

Although intermediate deadlines have been missed or pushed back, on 30 March 2018 the Council of Ministers confirmed the 2025 phase-out date and stated draft legislation would be brought forward later in the year. The cost of the phase-out, excluding waste management, is estimated in 2018 at €15.1 billion. As of 2018, Synatom has more than €10 billion in the phase-out fund, which includes the liabilities for waste management. Synatom may legally lend back three quarters of the fund's contents to its mother company Electrabel.

In July 2018, the Belgian government approved a Capacity Remuneration Mechanism (CRM) in order to ensure energy production capacity upon a nuclear phaseout. The CRM required approval from the European Commission: the Belgian Government needs to prove these subsidies are necessary and are not illegal state aid. Minister of Energy Marie-Christine Marghem (MR), who is not in favour of a phaseout, was tasked with its implementation, but did not convince the Commission by 2020.

=== De Croo government ===
In late 2020, the De Croo government was formed with liberal, socialist, green parties and Flemish Christian Democrats. The coalition agreement confirmed the nuclear phase-out by 2025, with a "plan B" option to continue 2GW of capacity if by November 2021 a report would show need for it. This was a compromise to meet some political parties like the liberal MR. Minister of Energy Tinne Van der Straeten (Green party), who favoured a phaseout, was tasked with its execution and ensuring a plan B would not be necessary. Engie Electrabel as well as regular FANC emphasised the need for quick clarity on the likelihood of plan B. In February 2021, Engie Electrabel decided to stop investing in a potential continuation of nuclear plants after 2025.

In 2021, Minister Van der Straeten worked quickly on revamping the Capacity Remuneration Mechanism (CRM) necessary for subsidies for gas-fired power plants. In April 2021 the Council of Ministers authorised the construction of 2,300 MWe of gas-fired (fossil fuel) plants under the CRM auction system. The CRM required approval from the European Commission under Commissioner Margrethe Vestager. On 27 August 2021, the Commission gave formal approval, on the condition all nuclear power plants would be phased out as planned. This essentially closed the fallback plan, as subsidies for gas-powered plants along with a continuation of some nuclear capacity would require a new approval procedure. In October 2021, Engie was awarded the subsidy auction to build gas power plants.

As Minister of Energy Van der Straeten was successfully implementing the nuclear phaseout and replacing it by a fleet of new fossil gas power plants, her predecessor Marie-Christine Marghem (MR) criticized the decision as harmful for the climate and called for extension of the low-carbon nuclear power plants lifetime. In 2021 media uncovered a potential conflict of interest, pointing out that Tinne Van der Straeten worked for law firm Blixt between 2012-2019, which represented interests of fossil gas companies including Gazprom.

Permits for Engie's gas-powered plant in Vilvoorde were blocked by provincial and Flemish authorities, under N-VA politicians who are opposed to a nuclear phaseout. By December 2021, this raised doubts within the Belgian Government whether the phaseout is reliably achievable. The MR -with Vice Prime Minister Sophie Wilmes- called for plan B. This demand was met with a new study by regular FANC on the whether a nuclear continuation is technically possible, while organising a new CRM auction. The CRM was changed to be able to award subsidies to a different project in case of permit issues. Marghem (MR) refused to vote in favour as member of parliament. As Open Vld with Prime Minister De Croo joined MR's doubts, the January 2022 report by FANC showed a nuclear continuation is possible if started immediately. Employers' organisations joined calls to continue operating nuclear power plants.

In February 2022, due to the Russian invasion on Ukraine, a nuclear phaseout with new gas power plants was untenable and Minister Van der Straeten was forced to switch to the fallback plan. In March 2022, Belgium officially decided to postpone closing the two reactors Doel 4 and Tihange 3 by 10 additional years.

The government subsequently had to negotiate with Engie to enable the two reactors to continue operations. By January 2023, an agreement was made, although it is uncertain it will be accomplished by 2026. Engie agreed to invest in the nuclear power plants while the government would cap the costs for discontinuation of the other plants and for nuclear waste.

== Hydrogen damage in Doel 3 and Tihange 2 ==
Mid August 2012 it was revealed that planned inspections, carried out in June, using a new type of ultrasound technique had detected thousands of quasi-laminar flaws in the forged rings of Doel 3's reactor vessel. The Doel 3 and Tihange 2 reactors vessels were both built in the early 1980s by RDM. Subsequently Tihange 2 was also inspected with this new technique at the next planned inspection. Tihange 2 reactor vessel was found to be affected in a similar fashion. During further inspections and reports from expert panels the reactors remained non-operational.

Shortly after FANC had communicated the news, the government responded angrily. Suggesting they might politicize the agency and stating the director general should have kept quiet until all reports were in. Three months later he was replaced by Jan Bens, a former director of the commercial nuclear powerplant Doel. Jan Bens' neutrality was questioned by FANC's own experts Pierre Kockerols and Yvan Pouleur. The latter, director of internal affairs, also filed a complaint at the council of state.

December 5 Electrabel, operator of the reactors in question, presented results of its investigation. It stated that the reactors could be restarted safely. The report was studied by AIB Vinçotte, BEL V, a panel of international experts and by a group of Belgian Professors. In May Kristof Calvo published the confidential reports of BEL V, and AIB Vinçotte. Both reports, compiled at the end of January, speak of uncertainties. Concerns are also raised due to the break exclusion requirement, and the fact that this level of fractures was unseen. At the request of the European Greens, materials expert and nuclear consultant Ilse Tweer, had also published her own report in which she argued against restarting the reactors.

Jan Bens stated to the Belgian Chamber of Representatives in March that the flaws were hydrogen flakes. He went on to claim that they had been there since construction and did not deteriorate.

FANC postponed its decision several times, requesting more tests and information. May 17 FANC announced that it will allow the reactors to be restarted. Doel 3 was restarted June 3, 2013 after nearly a year of inactivity. Thiange 2 followed a couple days later.

However, in March 2014 both reactors were taken out of service again, after the long-term tests agreed in June 2013 did not result in "the desired outcome". At the end of 2015 it was announced that they would reopen.

== External audit ==
In April 2016 an external audit stated that the federal nuclear watchdog (FANC) seems weak and prone to external pressure. Cases involving the nuclear power stations appeared to be especially vulnerable.

In November 2016 it was disclosed that FANC had sent two letters to the operator of Tihange Nuclear Power Station expressing its concern about the safety and attitude at the plant. After it had observed that safety procedures were not always rigorously adhered to.

In December 2016 a newspaper was able to examine the minutes of a May 2015 meeting, exposing that the director of FANC Jan Bens was initially against the law as proposed by the minister to extend the lifetimes of Doel 1 and Doel 2 reactors. Both him and law firm Stibbe which was consulted on the matter advised the text be changed. The agency however signed off on the original unaltered text only a few months later. Further calling FANC's independence into question. Jan Bens' predecessor Yvan Pouleur also restated that FANC lacks independence.

== Anti-nuclear movement ==
On the 2012 anniversary of the Fukushima nuclear disaster, Belgian group Nucléaire Stop Kernenergie organized an event in Brussels calling for an end to the use of nuclear power and the shutting down of Belgium’s nuclear facilities. Protesters insisted that nuclear power is unsafe. Austrian Chancellor Werner Faymann expects anti-nuclear petition drives to start in at least six European Union countries in 2012 with the goal of having the EU abandon nuclear power. Under the EU's Lisbon Treaty, petitions that attract at least one million signatures can seek legislative proposals from the European Commission.

In 2011 an industry-commissioned poll found that while a majority of Belgians supported the decision to phase out nuclear power. In 2012 70% feared higher energy costs and 82% believed nuclear power should not be phased out if it threatened energy security. It was found that 65% of the population supported continued nuclear power generation in the country. In the Flemish part of Belgium polls showed that only 16% of those questioned advocated an end to nuclear power generation.

In January 2013 an international protest against the Tihange power plant was organized by GreenLeft in Maastricht with about 1,500 participants from the Netherlands, Germany, and Belgium.

== See also ==
- Energy in Belgium
- Electricity sector in Belgium
- List of commercial nuclear reactors#Belgium
