= Doel Nuclear Power Station =

Nuclear power plant in Belgium

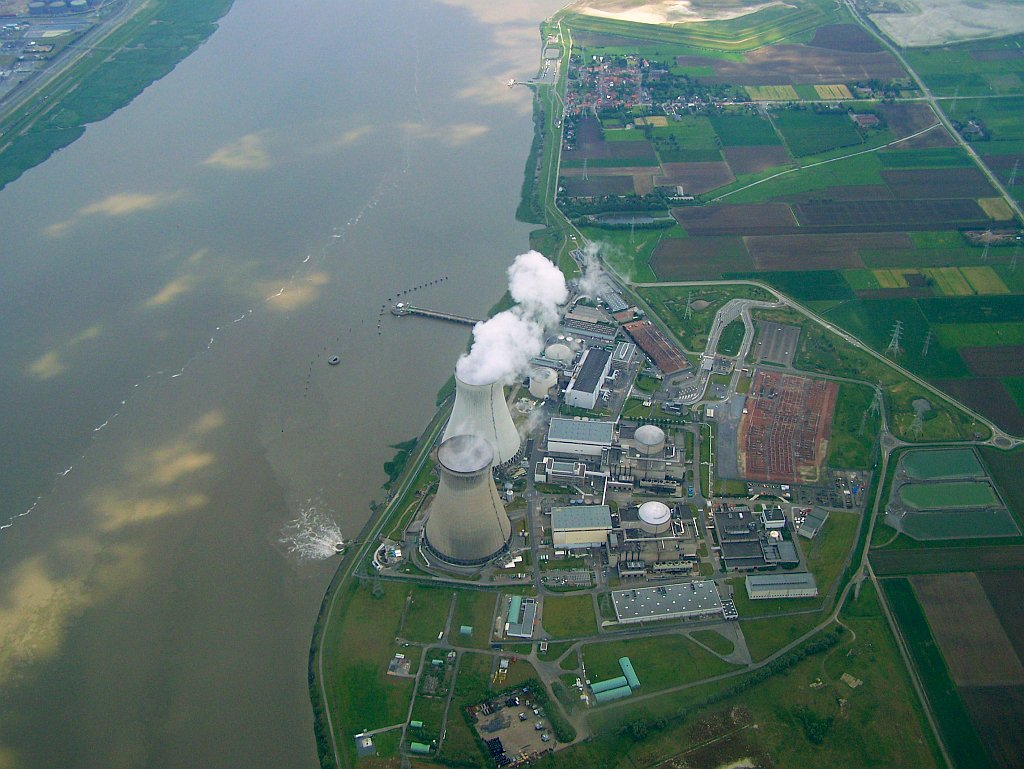
- Doel nuclear power station, viewed from the north
- Official name: Kerncentrale Doel (KCD)
- Country: Belgium
- Location: Doel, East Flanders
- Coordinates: 51°19′29″N 04°15′31″E
- Status: Operational
- Construction began: July 1969 (Doel 1)
- Commission date: 15 February 1975 (Doel 1)
- Owners: Electrabel, EDF Luminus
- Operator: Electrabel

Nuclear power station
- Reactor type: PWR
- Reactor supplier: ACECOWEN; FRAMACEC
- Cooling towers: 2
- Cooling source: Scheldt river
- Thermal capacity: 2 × 1312 MWt; 1 × 3064 MWt; 1 × 3000 MWt

Power generation
- Units operational: 1 x 466 MW (gross); 1 x 1090 MW (gross)
- Units cancelled: 1
- Units decommissioned: 1 x 1056 MW (gross); 1 x 466 MW (gross)
- Nameplate capacity: 1,484 MW
- Capacity factor: 91.8% (2021)
- Annual net output: 44.12 (2021)

External links
- Website: Doel Nuclear Power Station
- Commons: Related media on Commons

The Doel Nuclear Power Station is one of two nuclear power plants in Belgium. The plant includes four reactors. The site is located on the bank of the Scheldt river, near the village of Doel in the Flemish province of East Flanders, on the outskirts of the city of Antwerp. The station is operated and majority-owned by vertically-integrated French energy corporation Engie SA through its 100%-owned Belgian subsidiary Electrabel. EDF Luminus has a 10.2% stake in the two newest units. The Doel plant employs 963 workers and covers an area of 80 hectares (200 acres). The plant represents about 15% of Belgium's total electricity production capacity and 30% of the total electricity generation. Nuclear energy typically provides half of Belgium's domestically-generated electricity and is the country's lowest-cost source of power.

The station is located in the most densely populated area for any nuclear power station in Europe as of 2011, with 9 million inhabitants within a radius of 75 kilometres (47 mi).

== History ==
The power station was built by public utility EBES (Sociétés Réunies d'Energie du Bassin de l'Escaut), which in 1990 merged with Intercom and Unerg to become Electrabel. The plant was designed by the Belgian engineering firm Tractebel. Doel 1 and 2 are twin units that entered commercial operation in 1975. Doel 3 entered commercial operation in 1982 and Doel 4 in 1985. Doel 1, 2 and 4 were constructed by the ACECOWEN (ACEC-Cockerill-Westinghouse) consortium. While Doel 3 was constructed by FRAMACEC (Framatome-ACEC-Cockerill).

Earthworks for Doel 5, a 1400 MW reactor also known as N8 (8th nuclear reactor in Belgium), were stopped in 1988. Participation in the French twin plant in Chooz continued. French industry was compensated for already ordered components.

== Reactors ==
The plant consists of four second-generation pressurized water reactors with a total net capacity of 2,925 MW_{e}, smaller than Belgium's other nuclear power plant at Tihange. Its four units are rated as follows:

Reactor	Loops	Supplier	Thermal power	Gross power	Net power	Start of construction	First criticality	Grid connection	Commercial operation	Licensed until
Doel 1	2	ACECOWEN	1312 MW	466 MW	445 MW	1 July 1969	18 July 1974	28 August 1974	15 February 1975	14 February 2025
Doel 2	2	ACECOWEN	1312 MW	466 MW	445 MW	1 September 1971	4 August 1975	21 August 1975	1 December 1975	2025
Doel 3	3	FRAMACEC	3064 MW	1056 MW	1006 MW	1 January 1975	14 June 1982	23 June 1982	1 October 1982	2022
Doel 4	3	ACECOWEN	3000 MW	1090 MW	1039 MW	1 December 1978	31 March 1985	8 April 1985	1 July 1985	2035

== Design ==
The design of the plant is reviewed completely every ten years through a TJH (tienjaarlijkse herziening), a legal obligation imposed by the Belgian state and the operation licence of the plant. The purpose of the review is to update the plant to the most recent international safety standards.

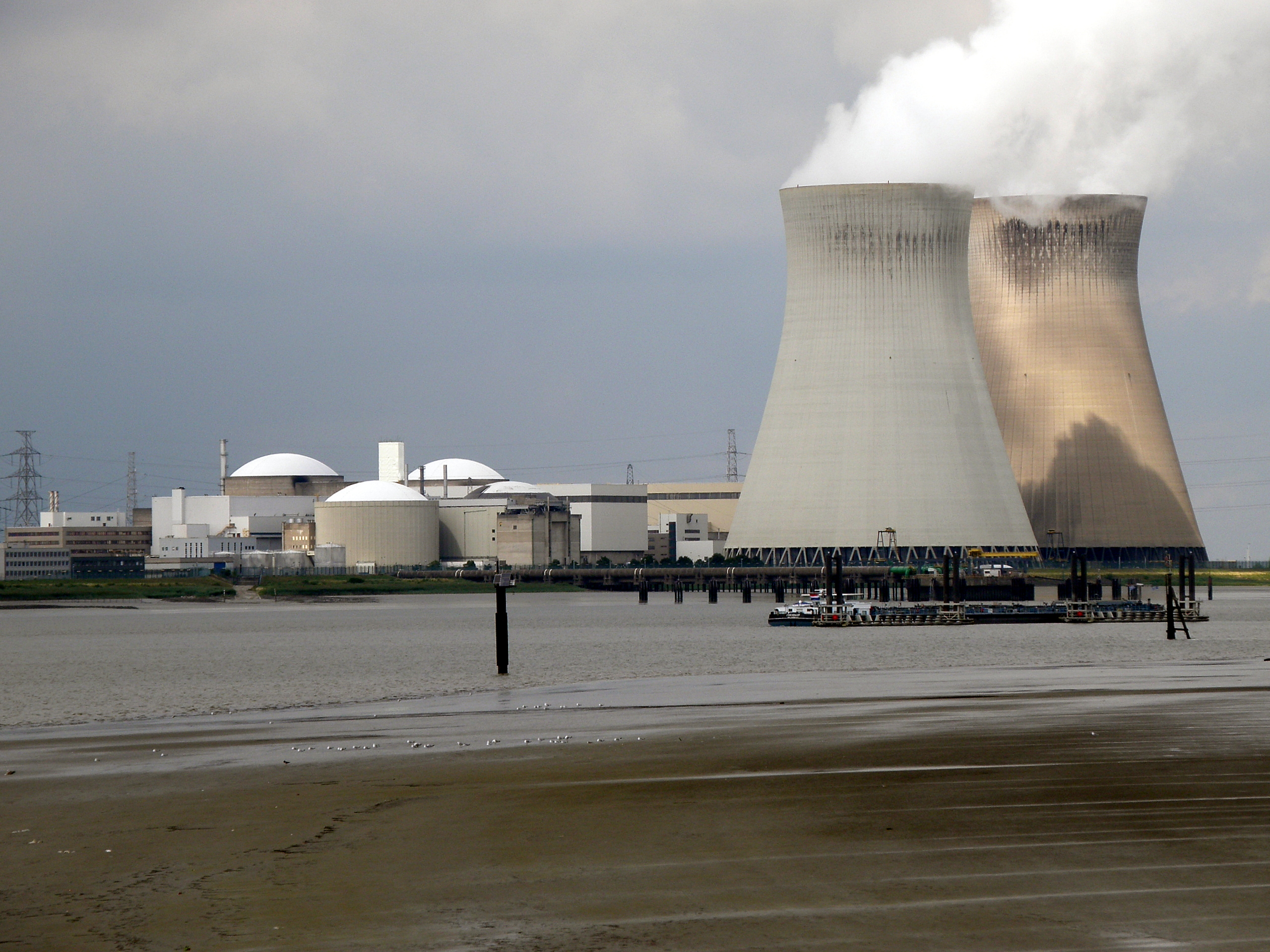
The station from the opposite bank of the Scheldt (2013)

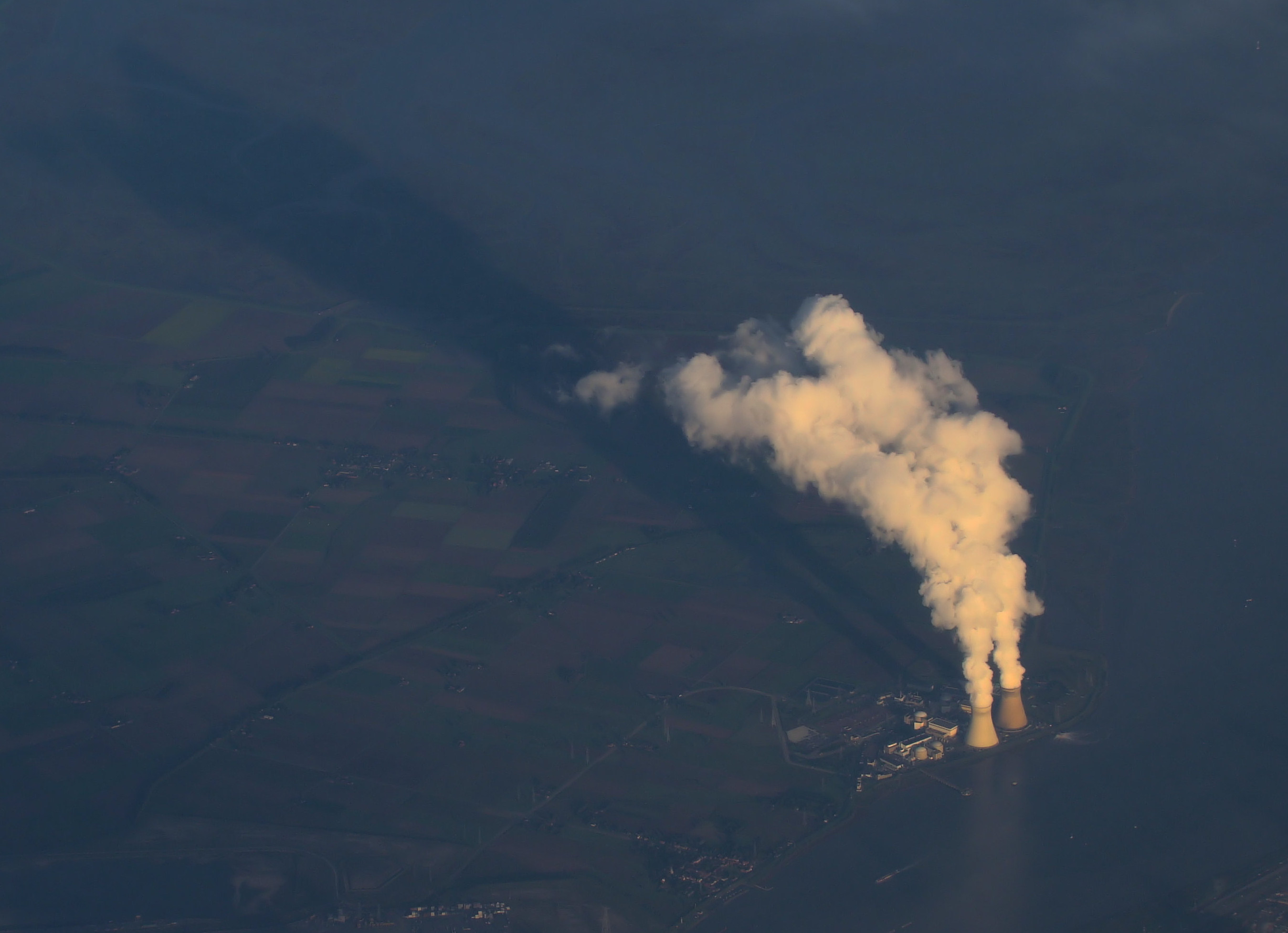
Doel Nuclear Power Station from a commercial airliner (2010).

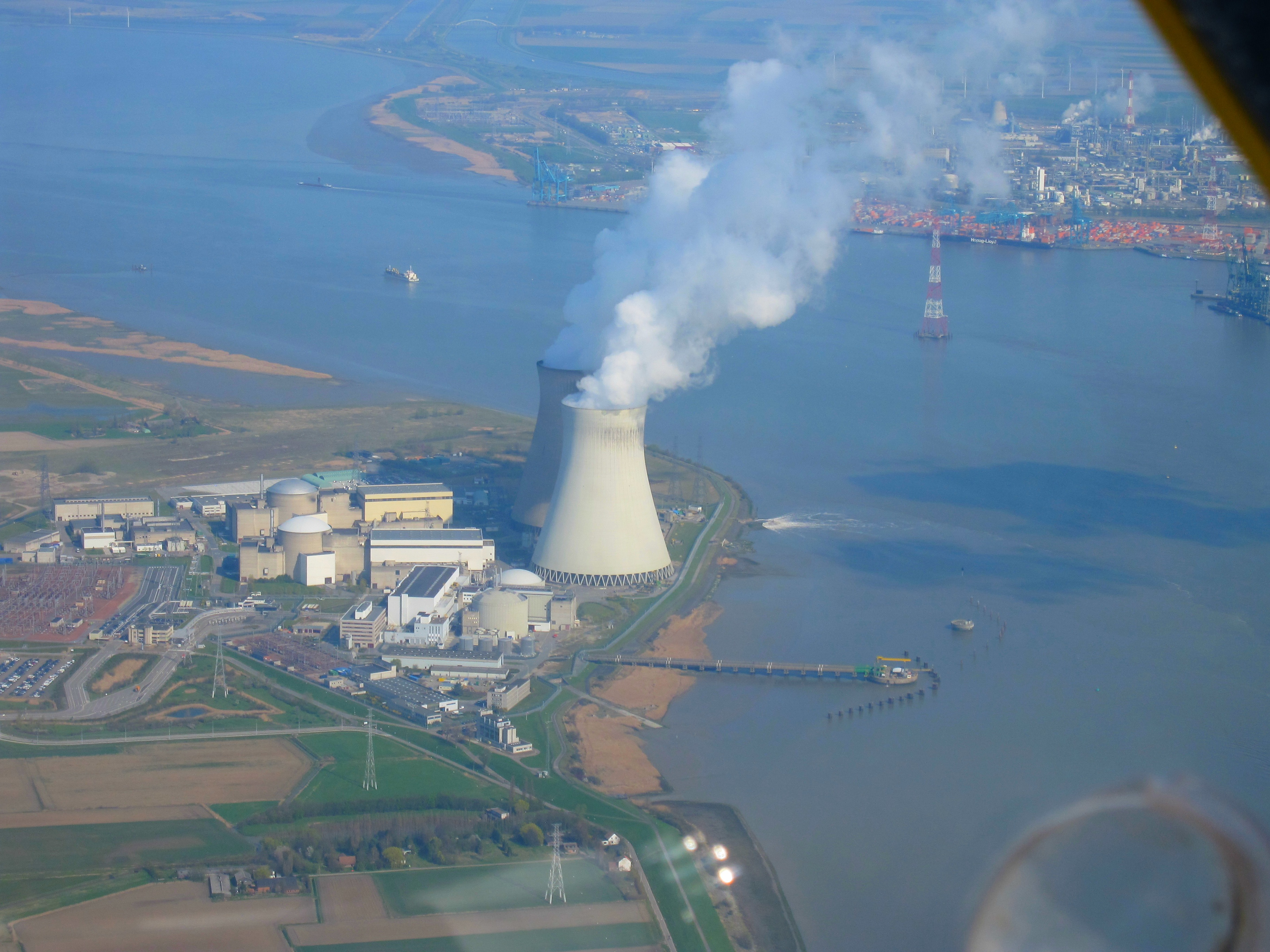
Doel Nuclear Power Station from the south (2012)

=== Meteorological conditions ===
Various weather conditions have been analysed including rain, seiches, tsunamis, floods, earthquakes, wind, tornados, lightning, snow, hail, extreme temperatures, cyclones, sandstorms and waterspouts.

=== Earthquakes ===
Since the design of Doel 3 and 4 and the first TJH of Doel 1 and 2 the reactors were designed to be subject to earthquakes such as the Richter scale 5.6 Zulzeke-Nukerke quake in 1938. At a distance of 75 km to the epicentre, this is the most significant historical earthquake for Doel. The earthquake resulted in horizontal ground accelerations of up to 0.058 g and formed the design base for Doel 1 and 2. Doel 3 and 4 were designed for peak ground accelerations of 0.1 g. After the Fukushima Daiichi nuclear disaster probabilistic safety studies performed by the Royal Observatory of Belgium predicted an earthquake with peak ground acceleration of up to 0.081 g every 10,000 years. The design was subsequently analysed for earthquakes up to 0.17 g, which is equivalent to a 1 in 100,000 year earthquake.

=== Floods ===
The Doel plant was originally designed for a 10,000 year flood of 9.13 m TAW (Tweede Algemene Waterpassing). The highest measured level was 8.10 m TAW during the North Sea flood of 1953. The site was filled to 8.86 m TAW during construction and fitted with a seadyke of 12.08 m TAW. The other dykes around the site have a height of 11 m TAW. Probabilistic studies performed after Fukushima showed the height of a 10,000 year flood had slightly increased to 9.35 m TAW, 22 cm higher than the studies performed in the 1960s. The highest possible tsunami is lower than 0.5 m. During post-Fukushima stress tests a dyke failure with a water level of 10.2 m was simulated. Due to the presence of bulkheads and pedestals in the buildings no safety functions were endangered.

=== Safety systems ===
Besides regular primary level safety systems, in common with most nuclear power plants in the world, Doel has secondary level safety systems that can autonomously keep the power plant safe during large external accidents such as the crash of an aircraft, external explosions or loss of the primary level. The primary level systems have a redundancy of three or four times. The secondary level systems are 2x100% or 3x50%. and have their own heatsink separate from the primary heatsink, the Scheldt river. Doel 1 and 2 have aircoolers while Doel 3 and 4 have three separate artificial cooling ponds.

=== Double containment ===
Nuclear plants are designed with multiple physical barriers to prevent fission products escaping into the environment. In the case of a pressurized water reactor there are three barriers: the fuel cladding which surround the fuel pellets, the primary circuit which houses the fuel rods and finally the containment building in which the primary circuit is built. In Belgium it was decided to add an extra double containment barrier. The primary containment, a steel sphere in Doel 1 and 2 and a pre-stressed concrete cylinder with steel liner in Doel 3 and 4, is surrounded by a secondary containment made of 1.2 to 1.3 m thick reinforced concrete. The space between both containments is kept at sub-atmospheric pressure and filters are used to filter potential leaks of the primary containment.

=== Filtered containment venting system ===
In answer to a question of die Grünen in the Bundestag, the German parliament, the German government replied that the Belgian nuclear power plants do not have filtered containment venting systems installed. In German nuclear reactors these were already built in after the Chernobyl disaster in 1986. Other countries followed this example, latest after the Fukushima nuclear disaster. This kind of system allows for the containment pressure to be relieved in the event of a severe accident. The non-condensible gases that cause pressure within containment to rise are released through a stack (or chimney) via a filtration system that removes large quantities of fission products from the effluent.

As part of the stress tests following the Fukushima incident, this issue had already been identified to be included in the stress-test action plan (BEST). Construction of containment filter venting systems at Doel 3 and 4 was completed in 2017, with Doel 1 and 2 scheduled to be operational in 2020.

=== Turbo feed pump ===
Every reactor has at least one steam driven feedwater pump which can supply the steam generators with water to cool down the reactor. These turbine driven pumps can cool down the plant even when no electrical power is available to power the motor driven feedwater pumps during a station blackout like the Fukushima Daiichi nuclear disaster. In a boiling water reactor, like those in Fukushima, the heat removal capacity of the pumps is limited as the steam that drives the turbines is radioactive and thus has to be stored. This is not the case with a PWR due to the use of steam generators. Steam can simply be removed via a chimney. Water supplies on site are sufficient to keep the plant safe for dozens of days.

=== Cooling towers ===
While Unit 1 and 2 have no cooling towers, Unit 3 has one 169.48 metres tall and Unit 4 has one 172.61 metres tall. The latter is the tallest cooling tower in Belgium.

== Nuclear waste ==
Light and intermediate level waste, which represents 99% of the volume of waste, is treated on site in the WAB (Water and Waste Treatment Building). Category A waste with half lives of less than 30 years is transported to Belgoprocess in Dessel for surface disposal.

High level waste was originally recycled to MOX fuel, and re-used in the Doel 3 reactor. In 1993, the Belgian federal government placed a moratorium on the reprocessing activities in order to research other options. Pending further decisions regarding the moratorium, spent fuel was stored on site in dry cask storage. Final disposal of the waste is being researched at the HADES underground laboratory 225m deep in the Boom Clay. Nuclear transmutation of the waste is also being researched with the MYRRHA project.

In October 2013, NIRAS suspended Electrabel's licence to treat two types of waste, concentrate and resins, after foam was discovered on previously treated waste due to an alkali–silica reaction. Electrabel has started a licensing procedure to use the process used in Tihange to process future waste. This process can take up to two years and in the meantime the waste in question is stored on site.

== Incidents ==
=== 2011 Doel 4 INES-2 incident ===
There has been one INES-2 incident on the International Nuclear Event Scale. After the replacement of an auxiliary feedwater turbopump, during the 2009 outage, one of the three feedwater pumps of the first level was adjusted to a lower level of rotational speed, delivering insufficient flow rates during certain circumstances. The two other first level feedwater pumps and three second level feedwater pumps were still available. The incident was rated 2 on the scale rather than 1 because the "Federal Agency for Nuclear Control felt that Electrabel waited a little too long to report the incident".

=== 2012 Doel 3 pressure vessel cracks ===
In June 2012 Doel 3 was shut down for its third scheduled 10-year in-service inspection. Ultrasound inspections revealed a number of cracks in the lowest forged ring of the reactor pressure vessel. The cracks were determined to be an original manufacturing defect, not related to tension, and theoretically of no risk.

The reactor remained offline for further inspections and assessment for a year. Eventually the nuclear regulator judged short-term safety concerns initially raised had been solved in a satisfactory manner and that the reactor could operate safely, and it was restarted in June 2013.

=== 2014 Doel 4 turbine incident ===
In August 2014, there was a major incident in the non-nuclear part of the plant. The main turbine overheated while operating without oil. A valve had been deliberately opened, which rapidly evacuated 65,000 litres of oil to an underground storage tank. The procedure was normally used in case of fire. The valve was normally secured by a padlock. Authorities and the plant operator suspected an act of deliberate sabotage. The unit was eventually back on grid by 19 December 2014. Combined with the outage of Doel 3 and Tihange 2, blackouts were not ruled out for the winter period of 2014–2015.

In December 2016, Electrabel requested that the justice department in Brussels prolong the search for the perpetrator of the turbine sabotage. Repairs cost more than 100 million euros.

== Other ==
=== Transmission ===
The power plant has two electrical substations. Two transmission lines run to Zandvliet and Kallo from the 150 kV station. The 380 kV station has three lines to Avelgem, Mercator in Kruibeke and Zandvliet. Elia is the transmission system operator.

The line to Zandvliet crosses the Scheldt River using one of the highest transmission towers in Europe. The tower is 170 metres (560 ft) high and built on a caisson in the middle of the river. The line is part of the interconnection between the Dutch and Belgian grids.

=== Cooling towers ===
With a height of 169 metres(554 feet), the two cooling towers are the most visible structures in the Port of Antwerp. Due to their proximity to the Dutch-Belgian border, the towers and the accompanying wet steam can be seen over large areas of the Dutch provinces of Zeeland and western North Brabant. Since early 1996, one of the cooling towers has hosted a nest of peregrine falcons.

=== Security ===
On 15 March 2016, the federal government of Belgium decided 140 soldiers would guard the nuclear sites and that Electrabel should cover the costs. In late 2015 it had already been decided that a specially trained department of the federal police would guard the nuclear sites. After the 2016 Brussels bombings, on 22 March the nuclear powerplants of Doel and Tihange were preventively evacuated, the standard procedure when the threat level in Belgium reaches Level 4. The powerplants continued running with minimal staff.

== See also ==
- Nuclear power in Belgium
- Tihange Nuclear Power Station
- List of nuclear power stations
