= Energy policy of Belgium =

Energy policy of Belgium describes the politics of Belgium related to energy. Energy in Belgium describes energy and electricity production. consumption and import in Belgium. Electricity sector in Belgium is the main article of electricity in Belgium.

Electricity generation in Belgium

Belgium is a federal state. The energy policy is mainly set by the three regions. Belgian federal government, if in place, have jurisdiction in some areas. The federal government have responsibility of the nuclear policy - and closing the nuclear plants. Belgium is a member of the European Union compiling the energy policy of the European Union.

== Climate policy ==
At the federal level, Minister Paul Magnette is in charge of politics of global warming. Belgium takes part in the European Union Emission Trading Scheme and United Nations Framework Convention on Climate Change. Belgium has signed the Kyoto Protocol. Belgium emissions in 2007 were 10 tonnes of carbon dioxide per capita, when the EU 27 average was 7.9 tonnes per capita.

EU renewable energy targets of final energy for Belgium is 13% by 2020.

== Electricity ==
Electricity was 13% of primary energy use in 2008. According to the IEA statistics the fuels of electricity consumption in 2009 were: 53,8% nuclear, 40,8% fossil, 7,4% renewable and 2% export of production.

=== Nuclear power ===
In October 2009, the final version of GEMIX report commissioned by Minister Paul Magnette was published. The report studied the energy sources for the years 2020 and 2030. It recommended not to close the old nuclear reactors in 2015 as previously planned. Ecolo the French-speaking green party was against keeping them after 2015.

=== Renewable electricity ===
Existing share of renewable energy of electricity in Belgium was 2.8% in 2006 and target 6.0% by 2010.

Belgium was an exception in the central Europe by not having feed-in tariff FiT for wind energy in 2007, like e.g. the Netherlands, Denmark, Germany, Italy, Spain, France and Portugal. Wind electricity production per inhabitant in 2009 was in Belgium 93 kWh/person compared to Spain 794, Germany 461, the Netherlands 278, Britain 138 and France 121.

Belgium had in 2007 FiT for small installations of photovoltaic solar power.

== Biofuels ==
Target for biofuels was in Belgium was 5.75% by 2010. The EU Biofuels Directive (2001) requires 5.75% biofuels of transport fuels excluding aviation by December 31, 2010.

== Regional policy ==
=== Flemish Region ===
As of 2009, there was 3.3% of electricity coming from renewable energy. The Flemish Region published various Beleidsnota energie. The 2004-2009 version was published by Minister Kris Peeters. The 2004-2009 version was published by Minister Freya Van den Bossche on 27 October 2009. This report was partially based on research conducted by VITO.

The Flemish region stated five goals for the government of 2009-2014:

- increase energy efficiency of buildings, processes, machines, processes, products and services
- reduce the energy intensity
- increase decentralized production
- secure electricity and gas at low prices
- ensure that the energy remains available and affordable for the poor.

The government target is 9% of renewable electricity in 2014 and 13% in 2020.

== See also ==
- Energy Technology in Flanders 2010 Flemish government
- Draft of Belgian National Allocation Plan for CO2-emission allowances 2008-2012 Brussels.
