= Tihange Nuclear Power Station =

Power station in Belgium

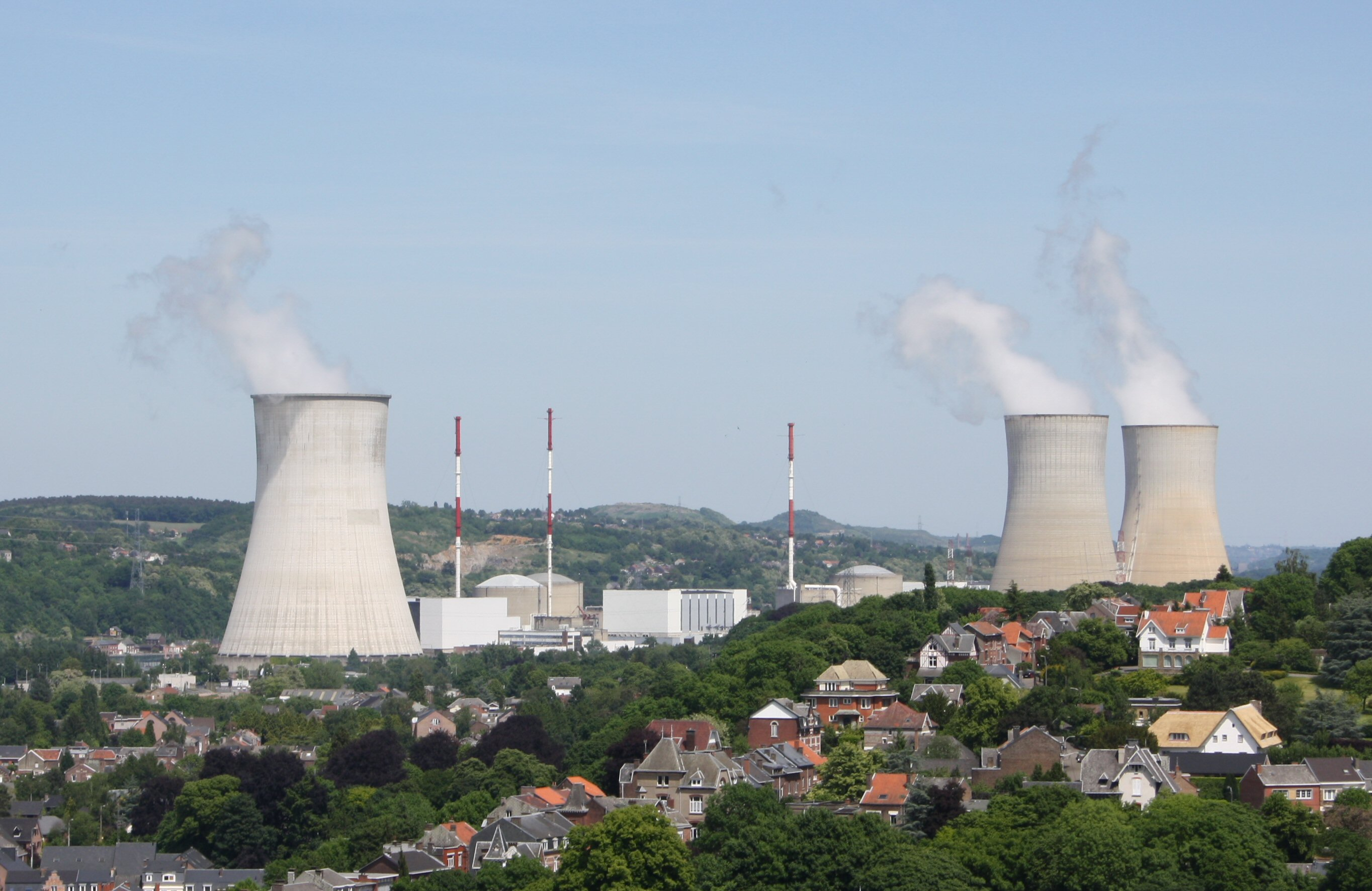
- Tihange nuclear power plant seen from the Citadel of Huy
- Official name: Centrale nucléaire de Tihange (CNT)
- Country: Belgium
- Location: Huy, Liège
- Coordinates: 50°32′4.66″N 5°16′21.12″E
- Status: Operational
- Construction began: June 1970 (Tihange 1)
- Commission date: 1 October 1975 (Tihange 1)
- Decommission date: 1 February 2023 (Tihange 2); 1 October 2025 (Tihange 1)
- Owners: Engie Electrabel, EDF Luminus
- Operator: Engie Electrabel

Nuclear power station
- Reactor type: PWR
- Reactor supplier: ACLF; ACECOWEN; FRAMACEC
- Cooling towers: 3
- Cooling source: Meuse river
- Thermal capacity: 1 × 2873 MWt; 1 × 3064 MWt; 1 × 3000 MWt

Power generation
- Units operational: 1 x 1089 MW (gross)
- Units decommissioned: 1 x 1055 MW (gross); 1 x 1009 MW (gross)
- Nameplate capacity: 2,000 MW
- Capacity factor: 65,2% (2014-2018)
- Annual net output: 17,169 GW·h

External links
- Website: The Tihange nuclear power station
- Commons: Related media on Commons

The Tihange Nuclear Power Station is one of two nuclear energy power plants in Belgium and contains one active nuclear reactor. The site is located on the bank of the Meuse river, near the village of Tihange in the Walloon province of Liège. The station is operated and majority-owned by vertically-integrated Belgian energy corporation Electrabel. EDF Luminus has a 50% stake in the oldest unit and a 10% stake in the two newest units. It employs 1074 workers and covers an area of 75 hectares (190 acres). The plant represents about 15% of Belgium's total electricity production capacity. Nuclear energy typically provides between 40%-50% of Belgium's domestically-generated electricity. In order to extend the lifetime of Tihange 3, the operator will receive subsidies through a Contract of Difference arrangement.

== History ==
The power station was built by a public utility Intercom which merged into Engie Electrabel in 1990 together with EBES and Unerg. The design of the plant was made by the Belgian engineering firm Tractebel. Tihange 1 entered commercial operation in 1975, Tihange 2 in 1982 and Tihange 3 in 1985. Tihange 1 was delivered by the ACLF (ACECOWEN-Creusot-Loire-Framatome) consortium. Tihange 2 was built by FRAMACEC (Framatome-ACEC-Cockerill) and Tihange 3 by the ACECOWEN (ACEC-Cockerill-Westinghouse) consortium.

Tihange 2 was shut down at the beginning of June 2012 for a planned inspection. The ultrasonic inspection revealed that there were thousands of semi laminar flaws in the reactor vessel's steel rings forged by Rotterdam Drydocks. These were determined to be hydrogen flakes, which influence steel brittleness and vessel pressure. The reactor remained offline for further inspections and assessment for a year. Eventually the nuclear regulator judged that the reactor could still operate safely and it was restarted 7 June 2013. The restart, was linked to an action plan concerning further investigations of the material properties of the reactor vessel. A piece of steel from a French steam generator with hydrogen flakes was irradiated at the BR-2 materials testing reactor to simulate the lifetime of the reactor vessel. At the end of March 2014 the test results revealed a different outcome compared to what was anticipated by experts. Therefore, the operator (GDF Suez) decided to stop the affected power plant until a clarification could be found and further operation of the powerplant is declared safe. After a re-qualification of the ultrasonic equipment and additional tests on a more similar German made piece of steel the reactor was restarted in November 2015. A separate investigation by Oak Ridge National Laboratory also justified the restart of the unit. The unexpected results were said to be an anomaly with the original test piece.

Tihange 1 was shut down from 7 September 2016 to 20 May 2017 for works on the non nuclear infrastructure. During construction works for safety upgrades a non nuclear building with auxiliary pumps was damaged. The reactor had to remain shut down while the building was fixed and the ground layers under the building were reinforced.

== Units ==
The plant consists of three second-generation pressurized water reactors with a total net capacity of 3,008 MW_{e}, slightly more than Belgium's other nuclear power plant at Doel. Its three units are rated as follows:

Unit	Loops	Supplier	Thermal power	Gross power	Net power	Start construction	Criticality	Grid connection	Commercial operation	Licensed until
Tihange 1	3	ACLF	2873 MW	1009 MW	962 MW	1 June 1970	21 February 1975	7 March 1975	1 October 1975	2025
Tihange 2	3	FRAMACEC	3054 MW	1055 MW	1008 MW	1 April 1976	5 October 1982	13 October 1982	1 June 1983	2022
Tihange 3	3	ACECOWEN	2988 MW	1089 MW	1038 MW	1 November 1978	5 June 1985	15 June 1985	1 September 1985	2035

== Design ==
The design of the plants is reviewed completely every ten years. This so-called RD (révision décennale) is a legal obligation imposed by the Belgian state and the exploitation license of the plant. The purpose of the review is to update the plants to the most recent international safety standards.

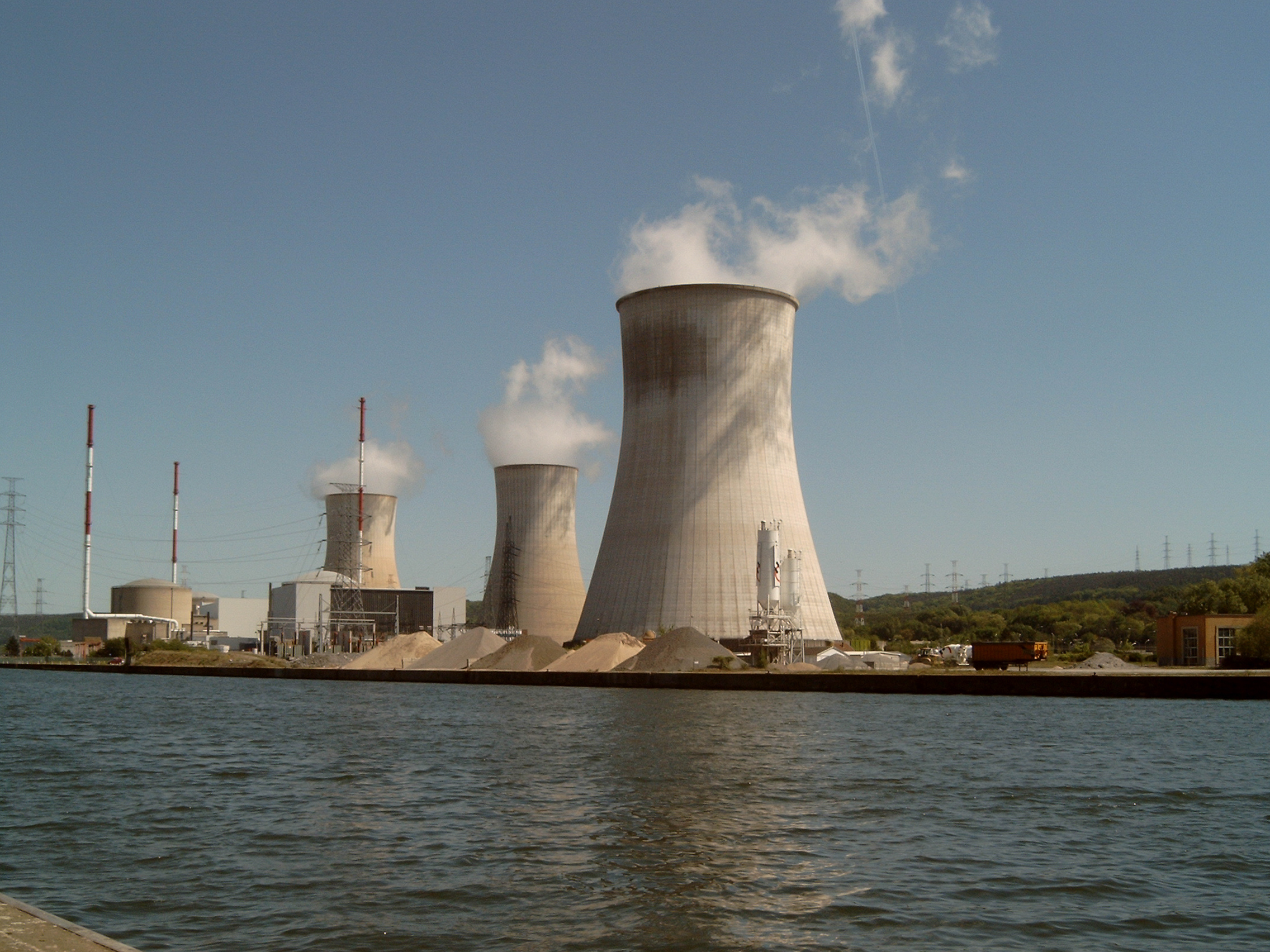
The station from the opposite bank of the Meuse (2007).

=== Double turbines ===
The Tihange 1 plant has two separate turbines to produce electricity, the total net electrical power of 962 MW is produced by two 481 MW turbines. These are referred to as Tihange 1N and Tihange 1S, turbogroupe nord (North) and sud (South) respectively.

=== Environmental conditions ===
Various weather conditions have been analysed including rain, seiches, tsunamis, floods, earthquakes, wind, tornados, lightning, snow, hail, extreme temperatures, cyclones, sandstorms and waterspouts.

The Tihange plant was originally designed for 1000-yearly floods. After Fukushima the design base of the plants was increased 10,000 yearly floods by building a flood wall around the plant.

Earthquakes were also considered. The historically most significant earthquake for Tihange was the one at Tienen on 23 February 1828 with a magnitude of 5.4 on the Richter scale. This earthquake resulted in horizontal ground accelerations of up to 0.1g and formed the original design base for Tihange 1. During the first periodic safety review of the unit after 10 years of operation the design base was increased to 0.17g, this corresponded to the design base of the (then new) Tihange 2 and Tihange 3 units. After the Fukushima Daiichi nuclear disaster probabilistic safety studies performed by the Royal Observatory of Belgium predicted earthquakes with peak ground acceleration of up to 0.21g every 10,000 years. The design was subsequently analysed and upgraded for earthquakes up to 0.3g.

=== Bunker ===
Besides regular primary level safety systems, in common with most nuclear power plants in the world, Tihange has secondary level safety systems that can autonomously keep the power plant safe during large external accidents such as the crash of an aircraft, external explosions or loss of the primary level. The primary level systems have two or three redundant trains of safety. The secondary level systems are 3x50% or 2x100%. and have their own heatsink separate from the primary heatsink. The primary heatsink is the Meuse river while the secondary heatsink is water from underground water tables.

=== Double Containment ===
Nuclear plants are designed with multiple physical barriers to keep fission productions from escaping into the environment. In the case of a pressurized water reactor there are three barriers: the fuel cladding which surround the fuel pellets, the primary circuit which houses the fuel rods and finally the containment building in which the primary circuit is built. In Belgium it was decided to add an extra barrier, a so-called double containment. The primary containment of the containment building is a pre-stressed concrete cylinder with steel liner. It is surrounded by a secondary containment made of 1.2 to 1.3m thick reinforced concrete. The space between both containments is kept at sub-atmospheric pressure and filters are used to filter potential leaks of the primary containment.

=== Filtered Containment Venting System ===
In answer to a question of die Grünen in the Bundestag, the German lower house, the German government replied that the Belgian nuclear power plants do not have filtered containment venting systems installed. In German nuclear power plants these were already built in after the nuclear disaster in Chernobyl in 1986. Other countries followed this example, latest after the Fukushima nuclear disaster in 2011. This kind of system allows for the containment pressure to be relieved in the event of a severe accident. The non-condensable gases that cause pressure within containment to rise are released through a stack (or chimney) via a filtration system that removes large quantities of fission products from the effluent.

As part of the stress tests following the Fukushima disaster, this issue had already been identified to be included in the stress-test action plan (BEST). All units will have functional containment filter venting systems by 2017.

=== Turbo Feed Pump ===
Every unit has at least one steam driven feedwater pump which can supply the steam generators with water to cool down the reactor. These turbine driven pumps can cool down the plant even when no electrical power is available to power the motor driven feedwater pumps during a station blackout like the Fukushima Daiichi nuclear disaster. In a boiling water reactor, like those in Fukushima, the heat removal capacity of the pumps is limited as the steam that drives the turbines is radioactive and thus has to be stored. This is not the case with a PWR due to the use of steam generators. Steam can simply be removed via a chimney. Autonomy is merely limited by the supplies of water on site. The initial supply of water in the reservoir is sufficient for almost 24 hours. After those 24 hours mobile pumps are used to fill up the reservoir.

=== Cooling towers and chimneys ===
Each unit has its own cooling tower: the cooling tower of Unit 1 has a height of 159.8 metres, that of Unit 2 measures 159.02 metres and that of Unit 3 159.27 metres. Every unit has also its own chimney, which are in opposite to that of other nuclear power stations realized as rooftop guyed steel chimneys: The total height of the chimney of Unit 1 is 161.18 metres, that of Unit 2 161.21 metres and that of Unit 3 160.79 metres.

== Nuclear waste ==
Low and intermediate level waste, which represents 99% of the volume of waste, is treated on site. Category A waste with half lives of less than 30 years is transported to Belgoprocess in Dessel for surface disposal.

High level waste was originally recycled to MOX fuel, and re-used in the Tihange 2 reactor. In 1993, the Belgian Federal government placed a moratorium on the reprocessing activities in order to research other options. Pending further decisions regarding this moratorium, spent fuel is stored on site in spent fuel pools. Final disposal of the waste is being researched at the HADES underground laboratory 225m deep in the Boom Clay. Nuclear transmutation of the waste is also being researched with the MYRRHA project.

== Incidents ==
There have been two incidents of level 2 severity on the International Nuclear Event Scale.

On 22 November 2002 a pressure relief valve on the pressurizer inadvertently opened while Tihange 2 was shut down. The reactor was being prepared to be restarted after a planned revision and refuel. While the pressure in the primary circuit was being increased to 155 bar one of the safety valves on the pressurizer inadvertently opened leading to a quick decrease in pressure in the primary circuit. The safety injection system activated as designed and injected cold water ending the transient.

On 5 July 2005 a relay of one of the six diesel generators of Tihange 2 was replaced. The device was not correctly tuned which meant that it would not be available during an accident, resulting in less redundancy.

== Other ==
=== Call for shutdown ===
Greens member of the European Parliament Rebecca Harms has called for the decommissioning of Belgium's oldest nuclear reactor, Tihange 1, as it no longer meets international safety standards.

Harms’ demand coincides with the publication of a new study on the risks of the continued operation of Tihange 1. The author of the study is Prof. Manfred Mertins, an expert in nuclear engineering and former member of the German Nuclear Safety Authority. He presented the findings at a news briefing in the European Parliament. The academic came to the conclusion that the continued operation of Tihange 1 due to “outdated reactor design, inadequate safety management and the accumulation of frequent unplanned events represents a potential danger for the site and its surroundings.” It was particularly critical “that the results of international tests and current safety standards are not adequately taken into account.”

=== Security ===
On 15 March 2016, the federal government of Belgium decided 140 soldiers would guard the nuclear sites. In late 2015 it was already decided a specially trained department of the federal police would guard the nuclear sites. After the 2016 Brussels bombings on 22 March the nuclear powerplants of Tihange and Doel were preventively evacuated, as per standard procedure if the threat level in Belgium reaches level 4. The powerplants continued running with a minimum amount of staffing.

In February 2017 the Frenchman Jean-Philippe Bainier was installed as the new CEO of Tihange in order to restore confidence in the safety culture at the plant. He succeeded Johan Hollevoet, who was in charge from September 2016 at the Tihange nuclear power station. Together with FANC a new action plan was made in order to raise the safety culture level. 'Safety is my first priority', insured the Engie Top-woman Isabelle Kocher: 'On the safety of our people, of the people living near the power plants and the environment is not to bargain.' In the action plan the responsibilities were more clearly defined and the company was willing to will appeal more independent expertise. The action plan includes a total of 314 actions, of which 142 were already carried out. The intention was that around August 2017 the action plan was to be completed.

=== Decaying concrete in Tihange-3 ===
In September 2018 during a planned inspection by the exploitant Engie Electrabel decaying concrete was found in the bunker-buildings of Tihange 3, where the emergency-systems are located. Only after further investigations and when FANC gives permission will the reactor be restarted. According to FANC the decay of the concrete had no impact on the direct environment of the reactors. The restart of reactor Doel-1 and Doel-2 was already postponed earlier from October to December 2018 because of needed maintenance. After inspection in Doel-4 and Tihange-2, concrete decay was found in the ceilings of the buildings as well.

On 24 September 2018, Minister Marie-Christine Marghem of Energy, mentioned during a press-conference that she would contact the Netherlands, France and Germany to help Belgium with extra capacity for electricity. Only one nuclear power station was available until November, because the repairs of the concrete ceilings take too much time. Engie Electrabel was criticized because the firm had waited too long to communicate the problems with the concrete in the buildings.

== See also ==
- List of nuclear power stations
- Doel Nuclear Power Station
