= Energy in Belgium =

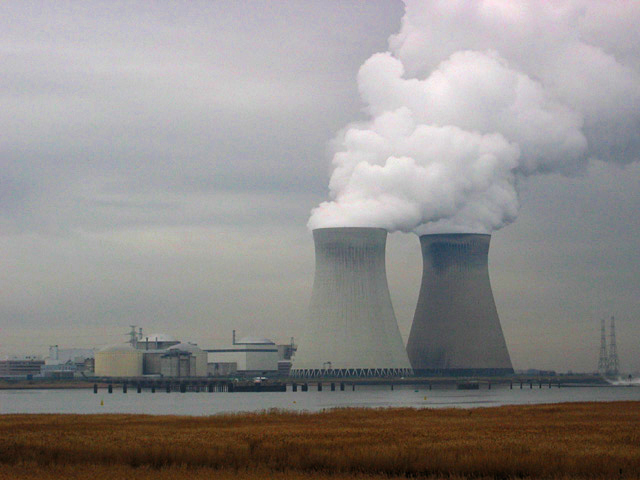
Doel Nuclear Power Station

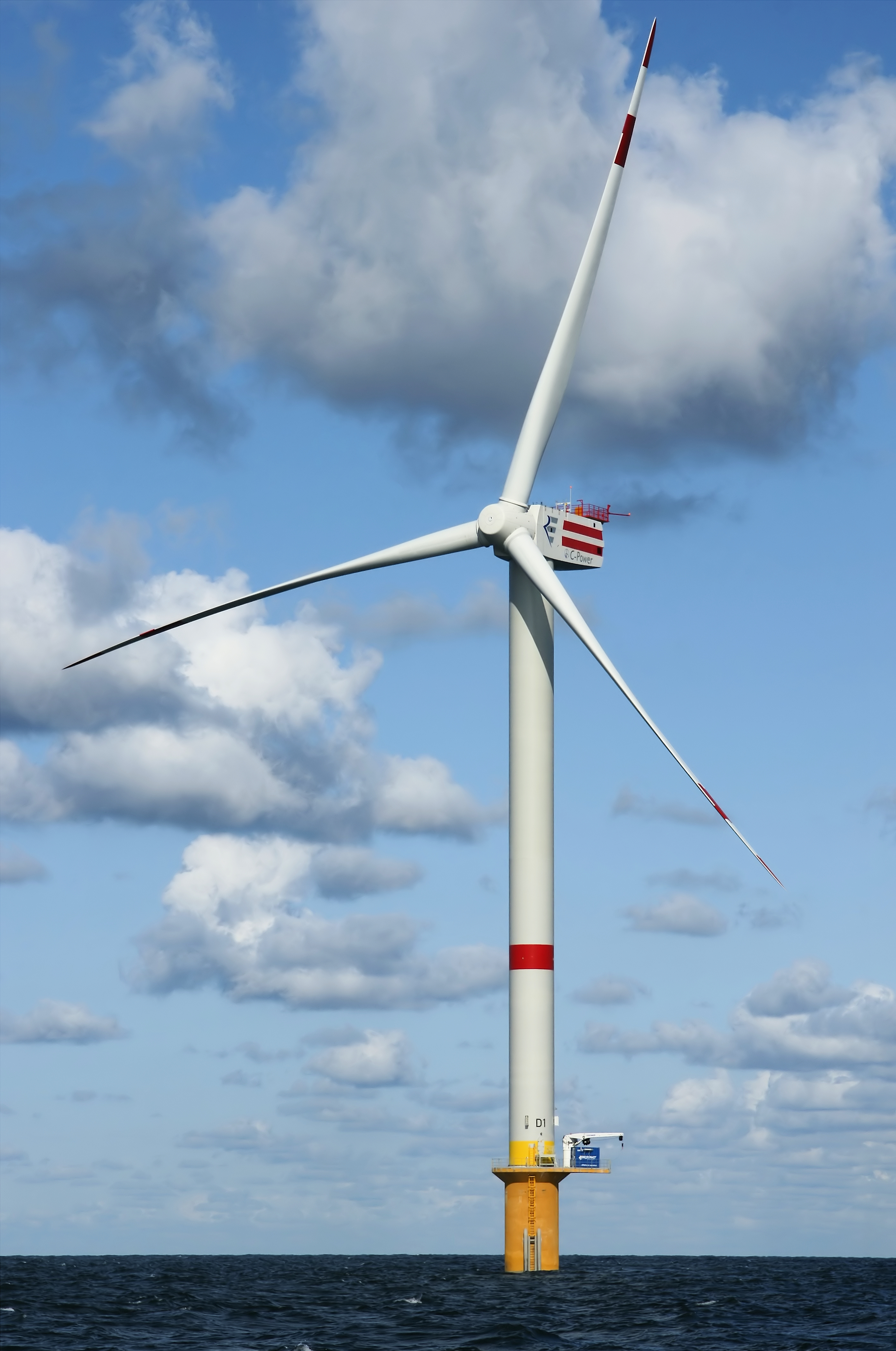
Wind turbine on the Belgian part of the North Sea

Energy in Belgium describes energy and electricity production, consumption and import in Belgium.

It is governed by the energy policy of Belgium, which is divided between several levels of government. For example, regional governments are responsible for awarding green certificates (except for offshore wind parks) while the national government is responsible for all nuclear power. As a member country of the European Union Belgium also complies with its energy policy.

Belgium is heavily reliant on aging nuclear reactors and gas-powered generators, although renewables (especially wind power) are generating an increasing percentage of electricity consumed.

The energy plan for Brussels is for it to be carbon neutral by 2050, with emissions down by 40% in 2030, 67% in 2040 and 90% in 2050 compared to 2005. Belgium as a whole has a target of a 55% reduction in emissions by 2030.

== Energy statistics ==
2020 energy statistics

Production capacities for electricity (billion kWh)
Type	Amount
Nuclear	89.98
Fossil fuel	78.08
Wind power	35.38
Biomass	18.16
Solar	13.68
Hydro	0.70
Total	235.98

Electricity (billion kWh)
Category	Amount
Consumption	81.17
Production	85.27
Import	13.39
Export	14.05

Natural Gas (billion m^{3})
Consumption	18.17
Import	22.61
Export	3.94

Crude Oil (barrels per year)
Consumption	234,440,000
Production	4,160,000
Import	243,350,000

CO_{2} emissions:
85.36 million tons

== Primary energy consumption ==
Electricity imports/exports

Primary energy is the amount of extractable energy present in fuels as they are found in nature. It is often expressed in tonnes of oil equivalent (toe) or watt-hour (Wh). Unless stated otherwise the lower heating value is used in the remainder of this text. A portion of primary energy is converted into other forms before it is used, depending on the energy conversion efficiency of the installation and method employed. This number differs significantly from the final energy as consumed by end users.

=== Import ===
In 2021, crude oil was imported mainly from the Netherlands.

Natural gas net imports are mainly from the Netherlands and Norway in 2021.

== Electricity ==
Electricity generation

Electrabel is main producer of electricity, followed by EDF Luminus.

Short term trading is done via the Belpex energy exchange, which is now part of APX-ENDEX. The Belgian transmission grid, operated by Elia System Operator, has a central position in the Synchronous grid of Continental Europe. This allows Belgium to trade electricity with its neighbours. Although currently there are only physical connections with the Netherlands and France, links with Germany (Alegro) and the United Kingdom (Nemo) are planned. Currently a maximum of 3500 MW can be imported. In comparison, the net installed generation capacity in Belgium is estimated to be 19,627 MW.

According to the GEMIX report the potential of renewable energy sources is 17 TWh per year.

== Energy types ==
=== Nuclear power ===
Nuclear power typically contributes between 50% and 60% of the electricity produced domestically (50.4% in 2010).

Belgium has two nuclear power plants:

- Nuclear Plant Doel with four reactors of (1) 392, (2) 433, (3) ~~1006~~ and (4) 1008 MW_{e} (1975)
- Nuclear Plant Tihange with three reactors of (1) 962, (2) ~~1008~~ and (3) 1015 MW_{e} (1975)

By law the nuclear power plants are to be phased-out. Two reactors (Doel 3 and Tihange 2) were closed in 2012; however the government has extended the life of the remaining five. The lifetime of one old reactor was extended to 2025; and in 2023, because of the Russian invasion of Ukraine, it was agreed to extend the life of Doel 4 and Tihange 3 reactors to 2035.

=== Fossil fuels ===
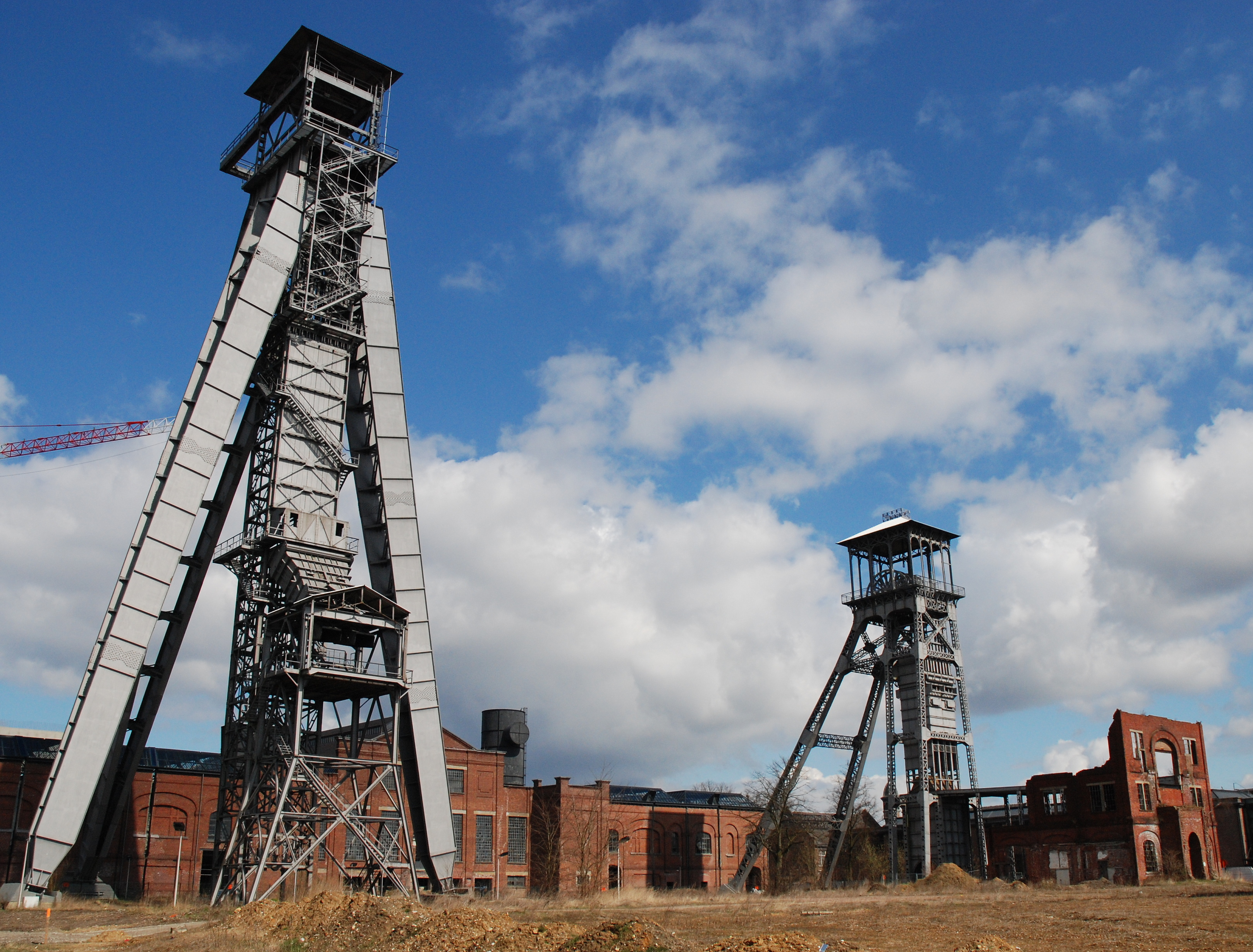
Closed coal mine in Belgium

==== Coal power ====
The use of coal in thermal power plants has been decreasing. In 2000 coal was still used to produce 14.25% of electricity, by 2006 this had dropped to about 10%; and in 2010 it was down to 6.3%. The last conventional coal units of the thermal power plants in Mol and Kallo were closed in March 2016.

==== Natural gas ====
In 2022 gas accounted for 24.4% of gross electricity generated, with coal at 0.04%. Fluxys is the main operator in natural gas transmission.

Several power stations use a combined cycle including: Drogenbos, Amercoeur, Tessenderlo. Building permits are being processed for plants in Seneffe and Visé.

==== Oil refining ====
At the end of 2011 Belgium had a distillation capacity 41 Mt. That year 72% of the capacity was used.

=== Renewables ===
Years in which the last three renewable power levels achieved
Achievement	Year	Achievement	Year	Achievement	Year
5%	2007	10%	2018	15%	2022

Renewable energy includes wind, solar, biomass and geothermal energy sources.

In 2000, renewable energy (including biomass) was used for producing 0.95% of the 78.85 TWh of electricity produced domestically This had risen to 13.01% in 2021.

On 11 May 2022 7,112 MW was generated by combined wind and solar energy production.

==== Wind power ====
At the start of 2012, there were 498 operational wind turbines in Belgium, with a capacity of 1080 MW. The amount of electricity generated from wind energy has surpassed 2 TWh per year. By 2021 wind power accounted for 19% of Belgium's installed power generation capacity and 11% of total power generation.

There are seven large-scale offshore wind farm projects. Northwind (216MW), Thorntonbank Wind Farm (325 MW), Belwind Wind Farm (330 MW) are operational. The others are in various stages of planning.

EU and Belgium Wind Energy Capacity (MW)
No	Country	2016	2015	2014	2013	2012	2011	2010	2009	2008	2007	2006	2005	2004	2003	2002	2001	2000	1999	1998
–	EU-27	153,730	141,726	128,751	117,384	105,696	93,957	84,074	74,767	64,712	56,517	48,069	40,511	34,383	28,599	23,159	17,315	12,887	9,678	6,453
15	Belgium	2,386	2,218	1,959	1,665	1,375	1,078	911	563	415	287	194	167	96	68	35	32	13	6	6

==== Solar power ====
The exploitation of Solar power is on the rise in Belgium. In 2021 solar accounted for 27% of Belgium's power generation capacity and 6% of total power generation.

Year	Photovoltaics		
Year	MWp	GWh	Ref
2008	71	n.a	
2009	574	488	
2010	787	560	
2011	2,051	1,170	
2012	2,768	2,115	
2013	2,983	2,352	
2014	3,140	2,883	
2015	3,252	3,045	
2016	3,561	3,086	
2017	3,846	3,149	
2018	4,254	3,563	
Source: Photovoltaic Barometer

==== Biomass and waste ====
In 2009, biomass and biogas were used to generate 3.5 TWh or 3.8% of gross domestic electricity production.

In 2010 5.07 million tonnes of waste was produced in Belgium, of which 1.75 Mt was incinerated. Nearly always (99.8% of the time) energy was recovered during incineration. Non renewable waste was used for producing 1.4% of the gross domestic electricity production. 1.9 Mt was recycled and 1 Mt was composted or fermented; only 0.062 Mt was dumped. Ten years earlier this was only 0.71%.

=== Hydroelectric power ===
Belgium has two pumped storage hydroelectric power stations: Coo-Trois-Ponts (1164 MW) and Plate-Taille (143 MW). Pumped storage stations are a net consumer of electricity, but they contributed 1.4% to the gross electricity production in 2010.

Despite the limited potential there are also a number of stations generating hydroelectric power. With a combined capacity of about 100 MW. Contributing 0.3% of gross domestic production in 2010.

Almost all of this capacity is realised in the Walloon Region. Even though hydroelectric power was used extensively in Flanders prior to the industrial revolution, there are no rivers where it can be generated on a large scale. The region's 15 installations have a combined capacity just shy of 1 MW (994 kW).

== Final energy consumption ==
Final energy consumption by sector (2010)

In 2010 the largest share (34%) of final energy was for domestic use (this includes: households, service sector, commerce, and agriculture). Transport and industrial sector both consumed about a quarter. Fossil fuels are also used as raw material in several manufacturing processes, this non-energetic use accounts for the remainder of the final energy.

A more detailed picture of the energy and type of fuel used by various activities is given in the table below.

final energy by activity(ktoe)
	Electricity	Natural gas	Coal	Oil	Renewable	Heat	Total	Share of final energy
Domestic usage (2009)
Households	1738	3322	264	2756	231	13	8324	20.2%
Commerce and services	1847	1728		952	9	69	4605	11.2%
Agriculture	88	235		433	35	25	816	2.0%
Other	9		9	46			64	0.2%
Industrial usage (2009)
Chemical	746	1979	13	149	18	370	3275	7.9%
Iron and steel	447	678	578	11			1714	4.2%
Non metal minerals	168	290	202	269	94		1023	2.5%
Food/beverage/tobacco	400	531	56	51	18	30	1086	2.6%
Printing/paper pulp	205	148	33	15	307	50	758	1.8%
Construction	110	197		63		3	370	0.9%
Non ferro metals	114	96	22		111		343	0.8%
Machinery	151	66	2	17	2		238	0.6%
Textile and leather	108	97	3	1		3	212	0.5%
Transportation items	87	92		4			183	0.4%
Wood	67	9			103		179	0.4%
Extractive industries	54	11					65	0.2%
Other	152	42	6	218		14	432	1.0%
Transport usage (2009)
Road				8881	231		9112	22.1%
Air				1295			1295	3.1%
Rail	151			35			186	0.5%
Inland navigation				165			165	0.4%
Total final usage (2010)
Absolute 2010	7163	11960	1363	21746	1156	640	44028	
Share 2010	16.3%	27.2%	3.1%	49.4%	2.6%	1.5%	100%	

=== Brussels-Capital Region ===
In the Brussels-Capital Region, the electricity and natural gas net are operated by Sibelga. In 2011, the natural gas consumption was 10,480 GWh and the electricity consumption was 5,087 GWh.

Sibelga invests in combined heat and power (CHP) installations for which it receives green certificates. In 2011 its eleven installations had a combined capacity of 17.8 MWe and 19.7 MWth and generated 50.5 GWh of electricity.

The Region of Brussels-Capital also encourages MicroCHP and implemented the European directive of 2002/91/CE on Energy Performance of Buildings.

=== Corporations ===
The companies Umicore, BASF, Solvay, Duferco, Tessenderlo Chemie, ArcelorMittal, and Air Liquide together account for about 15% of the total electricity consumption of Belgium in 2006.

== Greenhouse gas emissions ==
In 1990, the greenhouse gas (GHG) emissions were 146.9 million tons of CO_{2} equivalent (Mt CO_{2} eq), whose 88 million tons came from the Flemish Region, 54.8 from the Walloon Region and 4 Mt from the Brussels-capital Region.

Being a member of the European Union, Belgium, applied the European Union Emission Trading Scheme set up by the Directive 2003/87/EC. The Kyoto Protocol sets a 7.5% reduction of greenhouse gas emission target compared to 1990. Belgium set up a National Allocation Plan at the federal level with target for each of the three regions.

Belgium takes part in the United Nations Framework Convention on Climate Change and has ratified the Kyoto Protocol.

On 14 November 2002, Belgium signed the Cooperation Agreement for the implementation of a National Climate Plan and reporting in the context of the UNFCCC and the Kyoto protocol. The first National Allocation Plan was for the period from 2005 to 2007. The European Commission approved it on 20 October 2004. The second allocation plan was for the period 2008–2012 and aims a reduction of 7.5% of green house gas emissions compared to 1990.

By 2019, the Walloon region had decreased 34% of its CO_{2} emissions, while Flanders had only decreased 8%.

== Business ==
According to the Forbes list of billionaires (2011), the Belgian billionaire Wang Xingchun ($1 billion 2011) made his wealth in the coal business. Wang is a resident of Singapore who holds Belgian citizenship. Wang is the chairman of Winsway Coking Coal, a company that imports coal from Mongolia to China and went public in Hong Kong in 2010.

== See also ==
- Electricity sector in Belgium
- Energy policy of Belgium
