= SCK =

SCK may refer to:

== Institutions ==
- SCK•CEN: The Belgian nuclear research institute
- Supreme Court of Korea: Highest ordinary court in South Korea
- IATA airport code for the Stockton Metropolitan Airport

== Others ==
- Seeclub Kuesnacht
- Serial Clock of a digital electronics device, see Clock signal
