= SCK CEN =

Belgian Nuclear Research Centre

- Belgian Nuclear Research Centre
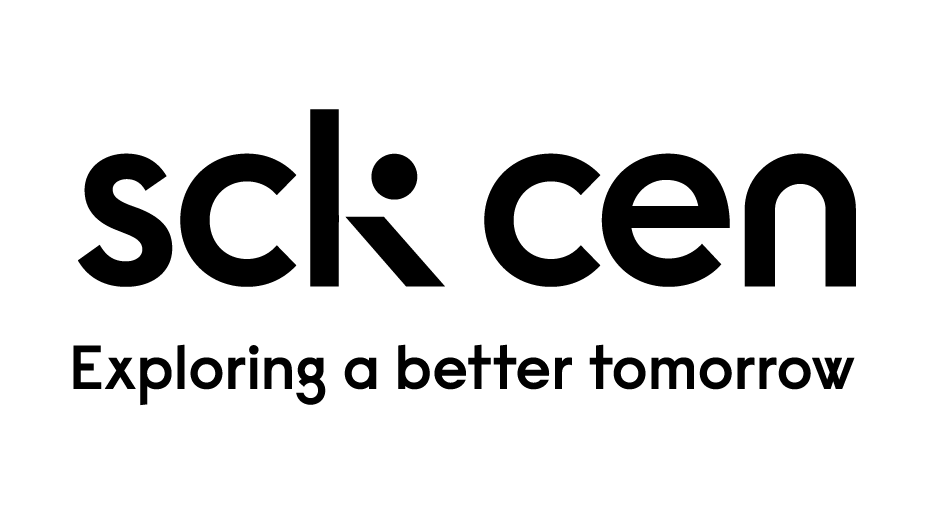
- Motto: Exploring A Better Tomorrow
- Established: 1952
- Field of research: Nuclear science & technology
- Staff: 1000+
- Location: Mol, Belgium; 51°13′07″N 5°05′36″E
- Key People: Derrick-Philippe Gosselin (Chairman), Peter Baeten (Director)
- Website: www.sckcen.be

SCK CEN (the Belgian Nuclear Research Centre), until 2020 shortened as SCK•CEN, is the Belgian nuclear research centre located in Mol, Belgium. SCK CEN is a global leader in the field of nuclear research, services, and education.

== History ==
SCK CEN was founded in 1952 and originally named Studiecentrum voor de Toepassingen van de Kernenergie (Research Centre for the Applications of Nuclear Energy), abbreviated to STK. Land was bought in the municipality of Mol, and over the next years many technical, administrative, medical, and residential buildings were constructed on the site. From 1956 to 1964 four nuclear research reactors became operational: the BR 1, BR 2, BR 3, the first pressurized water reactor in Europe, and VENUS.

In 1963 SCK CEN already employed 1600 people, a number that would remain about the same over the next decades. In 1970 SCK CEN widened its field of activities outside the nuclear sector, but the emphasis remained on nuclear research. In 1991 SCK CEN was split and a new institute, VITO (Vlaamse Instelling voor Technologisch Onderzoek; Flemish institute for technological research), took over the non-nuclear activities. SCK CEN currently has about 850 employees.

In the 1980s, SCK CEN employees were bribed to receive and store high-level nuclear waste from the West German firm Transnuklear.

In 2017, the International Atomic Energy Agency designated SCK CEN as one of the four International Centres based on Research Reactor (ICERR).

== Organisation profile ==
SCK CEN is a foundation of public utility with a legal status according to private law, under the guidance of the Belgian Federal Ministry in charge of energy. SCK CEN has more than 800 employees and an annual budget of €180 million. The organization receives 25% of its funding directly from government grants, 5% indirectly via activities for the dismantling of declassified installations and 70% from contract work and services.

Since 1991, the organization's statutory mission gives priority to research on problems of societal concern:

- Safety of nuclear installations
- Radiation protection
- Medical and industrial applications of radiation
- The back end of the nuclear fuel cycle (nuclear reprocessing and management of radioactive waste)
- Nuclear decommissioning and decontamination of nuclear sites
- The fight against nuclear proliferation

To these domains, SCK CEN contributes with research and development, training, communication, and services. This is done with a view to sustainable development, and hence taking into account environmental, economical and social factors.

== Chairmen of the Board of Governors (since 1952) ==
- Count Pierre Ryckmans (1952-1959)
- Count Marc de Hemptinne (1959-1963)
- Professor Julien Hoste (1963-1963)
- General Letor (1963-1971)
- Mr. André Baeyens (1971-1975)
- Baron Frans Van den Bergh (1975-1986)
- Mr. Ivo Van Vaerenbergh (1986-1989)
- Professor Roger Van Geen (1991-1995)
- Professor Frank Deconinck (1996-2013)
- Baron Derrick-Philippe Gosselin (since 2013)

== Reactors ==
=== BR1 ===
The Belgian Reactor 1 (BR1) is the first research reactor to have been built and commissioned in Belgium. This natural uranium air-cooled graphite-moderated reactor was commissioned in 1956. Its maximal thermal power is 4 MW, but it is presently only operated at 700 kW. Its natural uranium inventory could allow the reactor to run without refueling during several centuries (~ 300 years). At first, this research reactor was used primarily for research into reactor and neutron physics, for neutron activation analysis, and for a minor production of radionuclides. Now, it is being used for the irradiation of components, the calibration of measuring instruments, and for performing analyses and training nuclear students. BR1 operates by order of other research centres, universities and the industry.

=== BR2 ===
Commissioned in 1962, The Belgian Reactor 2 (BR2) is a materials testing reactor. It is a high-flux reactor (~ 10^{15} neutron・cm^{-2}・s^{-1}) in which neutrons are moderated by a beryllium matrix and cooled by light water pumped at low pressure (12-15 bar). Its core is very compact due to the particular shape of its beryllium matrix (paraboloid of revolution) allowing to install the fuel rods, the control rods, and the experiments in a very small volume (~ 1m^{3}). One reports that its very compact core architecture was quickly drawn on a beer mat during a discussion between nuclear physicists in a bar in New York during a very creative night at the end of the 1950s, or beginning 1960. In cooperation with the US government, its nuclear fuel is being converted to low-enriched uranium (LEU) from highly enriched uranium (HEU) to minimize the risk of nuclear proliferation. Its thermal power (100 MW) is dissipated in the environment by water heated at modest temperature (40-48 °C). This research reactor is also used for the production of medical radio-isotopes. The BR2 research reactor produces on an annual basis more than 25% of the worldwide demand for molybdenum-99 and in peak periods even up to 65%.

=== BR3 ===
The Belgian Reactor 3 was the first pressurised water reactor (PWR) in Europe. The reactor served as a prototype for the reactors in Doel and Tihange. It was taken into service in 1962 and permanently shut down in 1987.

==== Decommissioning ====
Decommissioning started in 2002. The European Commission selected BR3 as a pilot project to show the technical and economic feasibility of the dismantling of a reactor under real conditions.

=== VENUS ===
The research reactor VENUS, which stands for Vulcan Experimental Nuclear Study was commissioned in 1964. VENUS is used as an experimental installation for nuclear reactor physics studies of new reactor systems and for testing reactor calculations. The installation was re-built and modernised several times. As part of the GUINEVERE project, SCK CEN decided to re-build the VENUS reactor into a scale model of Accelerator Driven Systems (ADS). The particle accelerator was first connected in 2011. VENUS is a "zero power reactor": it has a power consumption of only 500 Watt.

=== MYRRHA ===
MYRRHA is a design of a Multi-purpose HYbrid Research Reactor for High-tech Applications. MYRRHA is the world's first research reactor driven by a particle accelerator.

=== INES incidents ===
After a leak in the hot cell of BR2 reactor, selenium-75 was released in the atmosphere on 15 May 2019. The event was classified by FANC at the level 1 of the international nuclear and radiological events scale (INES scale). ^{75}Se (half-life = 119.8 days) was detected at low concentrations on aerosol filters from several air monitoring stations belonging to IRSN (Institut de Radioprotection et de Sûreté Nucléaire, France), in the Lille area and in the northwestern part of France. IRSN also performed an atmospheric dispersion modeling analysis. The dose assessment showed very low exposure levels (< 1 microsievert) without concern for public health in France.

The power of the BR2 reactor was insufficiently measured on January 27, 2021, because two of the three measuring chains were not functioning in accordance with the regulations and the third was defective. Since the installation had two independent sets of three measuring chains, any power variations could still be detected.

FANC has classified this incident at level 2 on the INES scale, not only because the operating conditions were not respected, but also because a similar incident had already occurred at SCK CEN in 2019. These two incidents were related to a lack of safety culture from the licensee leading to inappropriate operations.

== Research activities ==
The Centres research activities are concentrated into the following main tracks.

=== HADES ===
In 1980, SCK CEN started the construction of an Underground Research Laboratory (URL) at 223 m below the ground level to study the feasibility of geological disposal in deep clay layers in the Boom Clay Formation at the Mol site. The underground laboratory was given the name HADES, god of the underworld in the Greek mythology. HADES is an acronym meaning: High Activity Disposal Experimental Site. Here, for more than 45 years, scientists perform research on the geomechanical, geochemical, mineralogical and microbiological characteristics of Boom Clay and on the interactions between the clay and the candidate materials for the waste packages. The underground laboratory HADES is now operated by the ESV EURIDICE, an economic partnership between SCK CEN and NIRAS.

=== Snow White ===
Since 2018, SCK CEN has commissioned a Snow White (JL-900) Early Warning System. This installation aspirates 900 m^{3} of air per hour across filters. These filters are replaced and analysed on a weekly basis. Because the system sucks up large quantities of air, SCK CEN can detect very low concentrations of radioactivity in the airborne dust. In this way, radioactive emissions, even when originating from abroad, do not remain unnoticed. Detection of low concentrations may indicate an abnormal emission, such as a hidden leak, or signal a nuclear incident. Snow White successfully detected airborne Cs-137 released during forest fires in the Chornobyl Exclusion Zone in Ukraine in 2020.

=== Nuclear Materials Science ===
Research is performed to improve the knowledge, understanding, and numerical simulation of the behaviour of materials under irradiation, and from there on predicting their performance. The aim is to develop, assess and validate new materials such as nuclear fuel, construction materials, and radioisotopes to be used in nuclear applications.

=== Advanced Nuclear Systems ===
Extensive contributions are made to extend the present Belgian expertise in the field of developments related to GEN IV reactor systems and ITER. In co-operation with the industry and international research teams, R&D efforts are made to develop and test innovative reactor technologies and instrumentation. This will contribute to the construction of an experimental fast spectrum installation (MYRRHA), allowing a.o. transmutation processes to be performed.

=== Environment, Health and Safety ===
Next to specialised R&D in the field of a.o. radiobiology and -ecology, environmental chemistry, decommissioning, radioactive waste management and disposal, SCK CEN also delivers measurement services such as radiation dosimetry, calibration, and spectrometry. Policy support, decision making, and research on the integration of social aspects into nuclear research contribute to meet complex problems related to radiation protection and energy policy.

The facility has for meteorological measurements a 121.1 metres tall guyed mast.

=== Education and Training – Academy (ACA) ===
Throughout its more than 60 years of research experience in the field of applications of nuclear science and technology, SCK CEN has also conducted education and training (ACA). The ACA activities at SCK CEN cover Nuclear reactor physics, reactor operation, reactor engineering, radiation protection, decommissioning, and waste management. Next to courses, SCK CEN also offers students the possibility to perform their research work at SCK CEN laboratories and research reactors. Final-year students and Ph.D. candidates can enter a programme outlined together with a SCK CEN mentor and in close collaboration with a university promoter.

== The Atoomwijk ==
The Atoomwijk was built to accommodate the employees. When the Flemish Institute for Technological Research was set up, a number of apartments were transferred, but the majority of the district is still owned by the study center. In addition to housing, the district also consists of sports infrastructure.

== Increased risk of cancer? ==
On behalf of the Belgian Ministry of Social Affairs and Public Health, Sciensano conducted the Nucabel 2 study from 9 January 2017 to 30 June 2020. This national epidemiological study focuses on the possible health risks, mainly cancer, for people living in the vicinity of Belgian nuclear sites. The results of Nucabel 2 state that the incidence in the close vicinity (< 5 km) of the Mol-Dessel nuclear site is 3 times higher than the rest of Belgium. The results are statistically significant. Nevertheless, the number of observed cases remains low.

However, the results of this study - as the Sciensano researchers also indicate - cannot establish a causal link between the occurrence of cancer cases and the proximity of the Mol-Dessel site.

Additional information on the Nucabel 2 study:

The Sciensano study was a descriptive epidemiological study in which no attention was paid to:

1. other sources to which Belgians may be exposed, such as medical applications or background radiation;
2. the effective dose that would be emitted in Mol/Dessel;
3. individual factors, such as infections, genetics, and other risk factors.

After further questioning SCK CEN on points 1 and 2, the following emerged:

Every year, a Belgian is on average exposed to a dose of 4 millisieverts. Almost half of this comes from medical applications. This - like the exposure from natural background radiation - has not been taken into account. However, this represents a much larger dose burden for most critical members of the surrounding population. The doses from discharges from nuclear installations are so small that the dose burden - compared to natural and medical exposure - is almost negligible.

The effective dose of all atmospheric discharges and all exposure routes of the SCK CEN installations amounts to a maximum of 2 micro Sv (μSv) per year. This is therefore 1/50 of the limit of 100 micro Sv per year for the whole nuclear site and 500 times less than the effective dose of natural exposure in the Kempen.

== See also ==
- Edgar Sengier
- European Atomic Energy Community (EURATOM)
- Flemish Institute for Technological Research (VITO)
- List of Cancer Clusters
- Nuclear Energy in Belgium
