= Uranium zirconium hydride =

Chemical compound

Uranium zirconium hydride (UZrH, U-ZrH_{x}), a dispersion of metallic uranium in a δ-ZrH_{1.6} matrix, is used as the fuel in TRIGA reactors. UZrH fuel is used in most research reactors at universities and has a large, prompt negative fuel temperature coefficient of reactivity, meaning that as the temperature of the core increases, the reactivity rapidly decreases.

Franco-Belge de Fabrication du Combustible, in Romans-sur-Isère, France, is the only manufacturer of this fuel.
