= Franco-Belge de Fabrication du Combustible =

French nuclear fuel producing company

- Company type: SA
- Industry: Fabrication of nuclear fuel assemblies
- Founded: 1973
- Headquarters: Romans-sur-Isère, France
- Number of locations: 3
- Parent: Framatome

FBFC (Franco-Belge de Fabrication du Combustible, French-Belgian fabrication of fuel) is a nuclear fuel producing company. From 1977 onwards its headquarters are located in Romans-sur-Isère. It operates a further two facilities, one at the Tricastin Nuclear Power Center in France and one Dessel in Belgium. In 2001 FBFC became a wholly owned subsidiary of Areva. Since 2018, FBFC is a subsidiary of Framatome. In Dessel FBFC employs around 150 people.

It is the only manufacturer of uranium zirconium hydride fuel in the world, a material used in TRIGA reactors.
