= GEMIX =

The GEMIX is a report commissioned by the Belgian Minister of Climate and Energy, Paul Magnette. The full title in French is Quel mix énergétique idéal pour la Belgique aux horizons 2020 et 2030?. It was completed on 30 September 2009 and published on 9 October 2009. The report received a lot of publicity, due mainly to its recommendations on nuclear power.

It was written by Dominique Woitrin, Marie Pierre Fauconnier, Danielle Devogelaer, Jacques Percebois, Luigi De Paoli, Jacques De Ruyck and Wolfgang Eichhammer. Luc Dufresne was president of the workgroup.

== See also ==
- Energy in Belgium
