= Hydrogen damage =

Metal degradation processes

Hydrogen damage is the generic name given to a large number of metal degradation processes due to interaction with hydrogen atoms. Molecular gaseous hydrogen does not have the same effect as atoms or ions released into solid solution in the metal.

== Creation of internal defects ==
Carbon steels exposed to hydrogen at high temperatures experience high temperature hydrogen attack which leads to internal decarburization and weakening.

== Blistering ==
Atomic hydrogen diffusing through metals may collect at internal defects like inclusions and laminations and form molecular hydrogen. High pressures may be built up at such locations due to continued absorption of hydrogen leading to blister formation, growth and eventual bursting of the blister. Such hydrogen induced blister cracking has been observed in steels, aluminium alloys, titanium alloys and nuclear structural materials. Metals with low hydrogen solubility (such as tungsten) are more susceptible to blister formation. While in metals with high hydrogen solubility like vanadium, hydrogen prefers to induce stable metal-hydrides instead of bubbles or blisters.

== Shatter cracks, flakes, fish-eyes and micro perforations ==
Flakes and shatter cracks are internal fissures seen in large forgings. Hydrogen picked up during melting and casting segregates at internal voids and discontinuities and produces these defects during forging. Fish-eyes are bright patches named for their appearance seen on fracture surfaces, generally of weldments. Hydrogen enters the metal during fusion-welding and produces this defect during subsequent stressing. Steel containment vessels exposed to extremely high hydrogen pressures develop small fissures or micro perforations through which fluids may leak.

== Loss in tensile ductility ==
Hydrogen lowers tensile ductility in many materials. In ductile materials, like austenitic stainless steels and aluminium alloys, no marked embrittlement may occur, but may exhibit significant lowering in tensile ductility (% elongation or % reduction in area) in tensile tests.

== Control of hydrogen damage ==
The best method of controlling hydrogen damage is to control contact between the metal and hydrogen. Many steps can be taken to reduce the entry of hydrogen into metals during critical operations like melting; casting; working (rolling, forging, etc.); welding; and surface preparation, like chemical cleaning, electroplating, and corrosion during their service life. Control of the environment and metallurgical control of the material to decrease its susceptibility to hydrogen are the two major approaches to reduce hydrogen damage.

== Detection of hydrogen damage ==
There are various methods of adequately identifying and monitoring hydrogen damage, including ultrasonic echo attenuation method, amplitude-based backscatter, velocity ratio, creeping waves/time-of-flight measurement, pitch-catch mode shear wave velocity, advanced ultrasonic backscatter techniques (AUBT), time of flight diffraction (TOFD), thickness mapping and in-situ metallography – replicas. For hydrogen damage, the backscatter technique is used to detect affected areas in the material. To cross-check and confirm the findings of the backscatter measurement, the velocity ratio measurement technique is used. For the detection of micro and macro cracks, time of flight diffraction is a suitable method to use.

== See also ==
- Hydrogen embrittlement
- Corrosion engineering
