= ONDRAF =

Nuclear Waste Management Organisation (WMO) in Belgium

ONDRAF/NIRAS (Dutch: Nationale instelling voor radioactief afval en verrijkte Splijtstoffen, French: Organisme national des déchets radioactifs et des matières fissiles enrichies, German: Nationale Einrichtung für Radioaktive Abfälle und angereicherte Spaltmaterialien) is the Belgian National Agency for Radioactive Waste and enriched Fissile Material. It is established by Belgian law since 1980.

== Belgoprocess ==
Belgoprocess is the industrial subsidiary. It manages and executes the industrial activities of the agency. Belgoprocess was founded in 1984 as a subsidiary of Synatom nv. Synatom is the Electrabel subsidiary that manages the fuel cycle for the commercial reactors in Belgium. In 1985 Belgoprocess acquired the staff from Eurochemics. A pilot nuclear reprocessing plant which was being decommissioned. In 1986 Belgoprocess was transferred to ONDRAF/NIRAS. The Site of the former Eurochemics plant in Dessel is known as Belgoproces Site 1. In 1989 Belgoprocess also took over the waste department of SCK•CEN, the study center for nuclear research, in Mol now also known as Belgoproces Site 2.

== Site ONDRAF Fleurus ==
In 2012 ONDRAF/NIRAS became responsible for the premises of the now defunct American company Best Medical Belgium, located on the site of the Institute for Radioelements(IRE) in Fleurus Belgium.

== Long term storage ==
=== cAt-project ===
The cAt-project aims to offer a storage solution for low and intermediate radioactive waste with a short half-life (less than 30 years), so called category A waste. It is to be encased in modular concrete boxes which are stacked inside structures which ultimately will resemble tumuli on a site adjacent to Belgoprocess Site 1. This structure is to be actively monitored for 300 years.

=== HADES ===
HADES is an underground laboratory, since 1980 it is researching if layers of clay as found in the North-East of Belgium could be used for permanent storage of nuclear waste. It is run by ONDRAF/NIRAS and SCK•CEN through EIG EURIDICE (European Underground Research Infrastructure for Disposal of nuclear waste In Clay Environment). In 2011 ONDRAF/NIRAS published the Waste Plan which evaluates all proposed storage solutions and concludes by recommending storage it in the aforementioned layers of clay.
