= Electricity sector in Belgium =

Electricity generation in Belgium

Electricity production in Belgium totaled 65.8 TWh in 2025. Nuclear power accounted for 34.2% of generation, followed by natural gas at 18.7%, solar power at 15.3%, onshore wind at 10.3%, and offshore wind at 8.4%. Electricity consumption was 80.1 TWh.

Belgium's federal electricity policy aimed to enhance renewable energy, increase cross-border interconnection capacity, and phase out nuclear power by 2025. A key initiative includes promoting offshore wind energy through competitive auctioning processes. In response to the nuclear phase-out, Belgium is set to introduce between 2.0 and 3.6 gigawatts (GW) of new capacity by 2025.

== Electricity per capita by power source ==
In 2008 Belgium consumed electricity 8,961 kWh/person. EU15 average was 7,409 kWh/person.

Electricity per capita in Belgium (kWh/person)
Year	Use	Production	Net Imports		Fossil	Nuclear		Other RE	Biomass & waste	Wind	Non RE use*	RE %
Year	Use	Production	Amount	%	Fossil	Amount	%	Other RE	Biomass & waste	Wind	Non RE use*	RE %
2004	8,967	8,219	749	8.3%	3,323	4,540	50.6 %	168	187		8,612	4.0%
2005	8,913	8,311	602	6.8 %	3,351	4,546	51.0%	200	215		8,499	4.7%
2006	9,111	8,466	645	7.1%	3,343	4,581	50.3 %	234	308		8,568	5.9%
2008	8,961	7,962	999	11.1%	2,997	4,295	47.9 %	252	418		8,291	7.5%
2009	8,152	8,319	-167	-2.0 %	3,330	4,388	53.8%	74*	436	93*	7,549	7,4%
* Other RE is waterpower, solar and geothermal electricity and wind power until 2008 * Non RE use = use – production of renewable electricity * RE % = (production of RE / use) * 100% Note: European Union calculates the share of renewable energies in gross electrical consumption.

== Imports ==
Total electricity imports in Belgium were 11 TWh in 2008. This was the seventh highest total in the world behind Brazil (42 TWh), Italy (40 TWh), USA (33 TWh), the Netherlands (16 TWh), Finland (13 TWh), and the UK (11 TWh). More recent data show that this deficit was reduced to 9.6 TWh in 2013.

Belgium has traditionally depended on electricity imports, mainly from France and, in recent years, the Netherlands. Although it has been a net importer since 1991, it became a net exporter in more recent years, particularly in 2019 and 2020. The net exports in 2019 reached 1.9 terawatt-hours (TWh), supported by increased nuclear generation, enhanced wind and solar PV production, and the initiation of its first interconnection with the United Kingdom. However, net exports fell to 0.3 TWh in 2020.

== Nuclear power ==
In 2020, Belgium's nuclear sector comprised seven reactors across two power plants, with an installed capacity of 5.94 gigawatts (GW). The nuclear reactors generated 34.4 terawatt-hours (TWh) of electricity, marking a 28% decrease since 2010. Despite this decline, nuclear energy accounted for 17.8% of Belgium's total energy supply and 39.2% of its electricity generation.

Belgium's nuclear policy aimed to achieve a secure phase-out by 2025 while prioritizing safe waste disposal and research continuity. Oversight of safety and licensing is entrusted to the Federal Agency for Nuclear Control. Enacted in 2003, Belgium's federal law mandates the phase-out of all nuclear electricity generation. Amendments in 2013 and 2015 extended the operational lifespan of two reactors until 2025. In 2022, Belgium extended 2 gigawatts (GW) of nuclear capacity for ten years, citing the Russian invasion of Ukraine and a commitment to reduce reliance on fossil fuels as reasons. In accordance with this revised plan, the majority of Belgium's nuclear power generation capacity will be phased-out by 2025. Additionally, Belgium implemented a Capacity Remuneration Mechanism (CRM), auctioning payments to 4.4 GW of capacity in October 2021, aimed at supporting electricity supply.

== Renewable electricity ==
From 2010 to 2020, Belgium's production of electricity from renewable sources expanded from 5.4 terawatt-hours (TWh) to 23.4 TWh. This growth was principally attributed to an increase in wind energy, from 1.4% to 14.4% of the country's total electricity generation, and an enhancement in solar photovoltaic (PV) output, from 0.6% to 5.8%. Additionally, electricity generated from bioenergy—which encompasses solid biomass, biogas, renewable waste, and liquid biofuels—rose from 4.4% to 6.0%. Conversely, due to Belgium's constrained hydropower resources, hydropower's share of electricity generation remained minimal, at 0.3% in 2020.

Since 2020, electricity generation from renewable sources in Belgium has continued to increase, driven mainly by the expansion of wind and solar photovoltaic generation. In 2025, wind power generated 13.5 TWh and solar photovoltaic systems generated 10.5 TWh, compared with 12.8 TWh and 5.1 TWh, respectively, in 2020. Other renewable sources included solid biofuels, biogas, renewable municipal waste and hydropower. Overall, renewable sources accounted for approximately 38% of Belgium's gross electricity generation in 2025, with wind and solar together accounting for nearly one-third of total generation.

== Energy-related CO_{2} emissions ==
In 2020, Belgium's carbon dioxide emissions from energy use were predominantly from industry (32%), buildings (26%), transportation (25%), and electricity/heat generation (17%). The major fuel sources driving these emissions included oil (46%) and natural gas (40%), with coal (10%) and non-renewable waste (4%) also contributing.

== See also ==
- Energy in Belgium
- Nuclear power in Belgium
- Wind power in Belgium
