= Luminus =

Belgian energy company

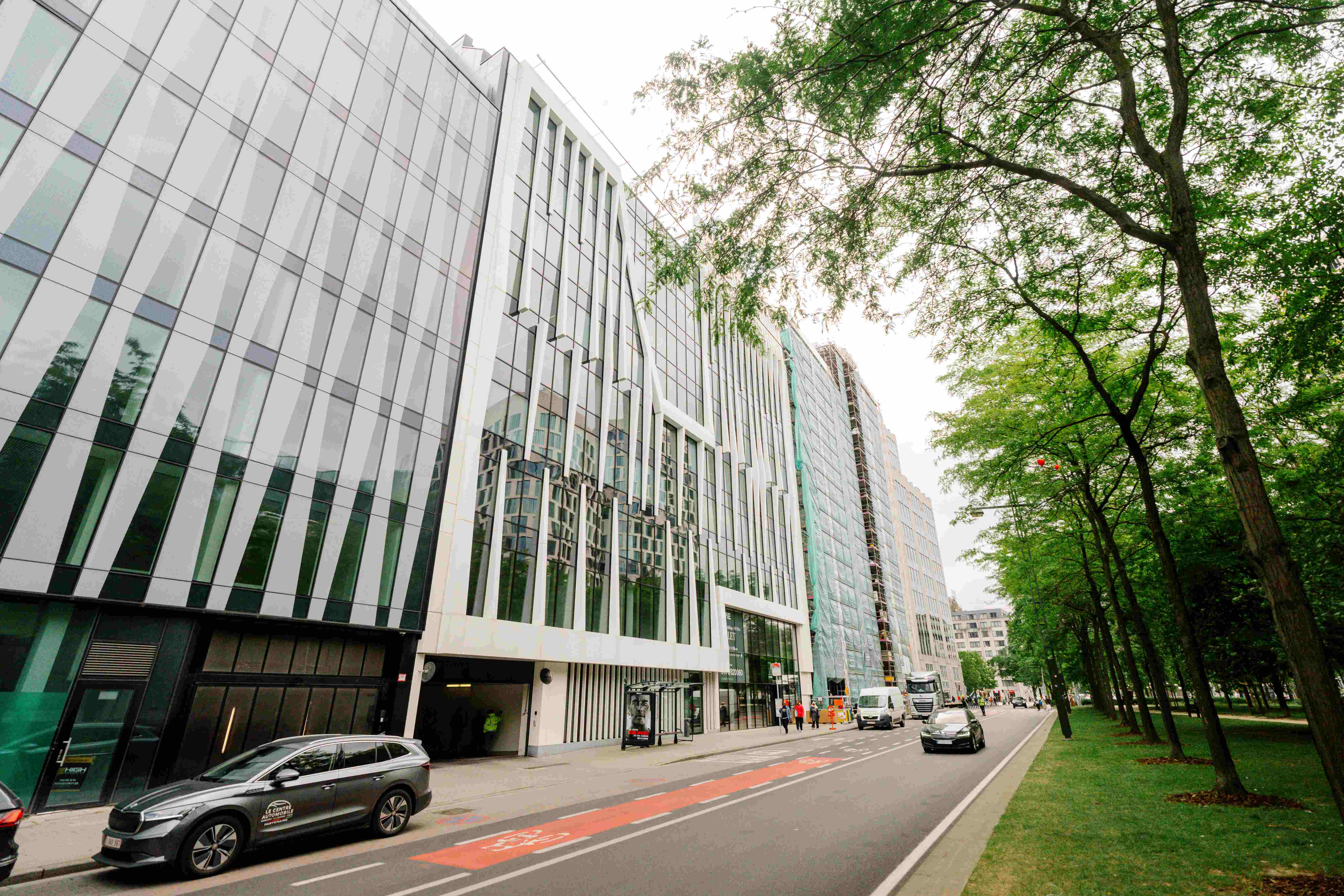
- Luminus main office in Brussels
- Industry: Electricity
- Predecessor: EDF Luminus
- Headquarters: Brussels, Belgium
- Key people: Grégoire Dallemagne (CEO)
- Products: Electrical power Natural gas
- Services: Electricity distribution
- Number of employees: 1,000
- Parent: Électricité de France
- Website: www.luminus.be

Luminus (former names: Société productrice d'électricité, SPE, SPE-Luminus, and EDF Luminus) is the second largest electricity producer and energy supplier on the Belgian energy market. Its main shareholder is Électricité de France with a 68.6% stake.

== History ==
The company was established as municipalities joint utility Société productrice d'électricité (SPE) in 1978. In July 2008 Centrica acquired its majority stake in SPE by buying out Gaz de France. In 2009, Centrica sold its shares to EDF. In September 2010, SPE Luminus as a subsidiary of EDF, took over the sales activities of EDF Belgium. Grégoire Dallemagne took up office as CEO on 1 September 2011. On 23 November 2011, the company was renamed EDF Luminus to become Luminus in April 2019.

== Operations ==
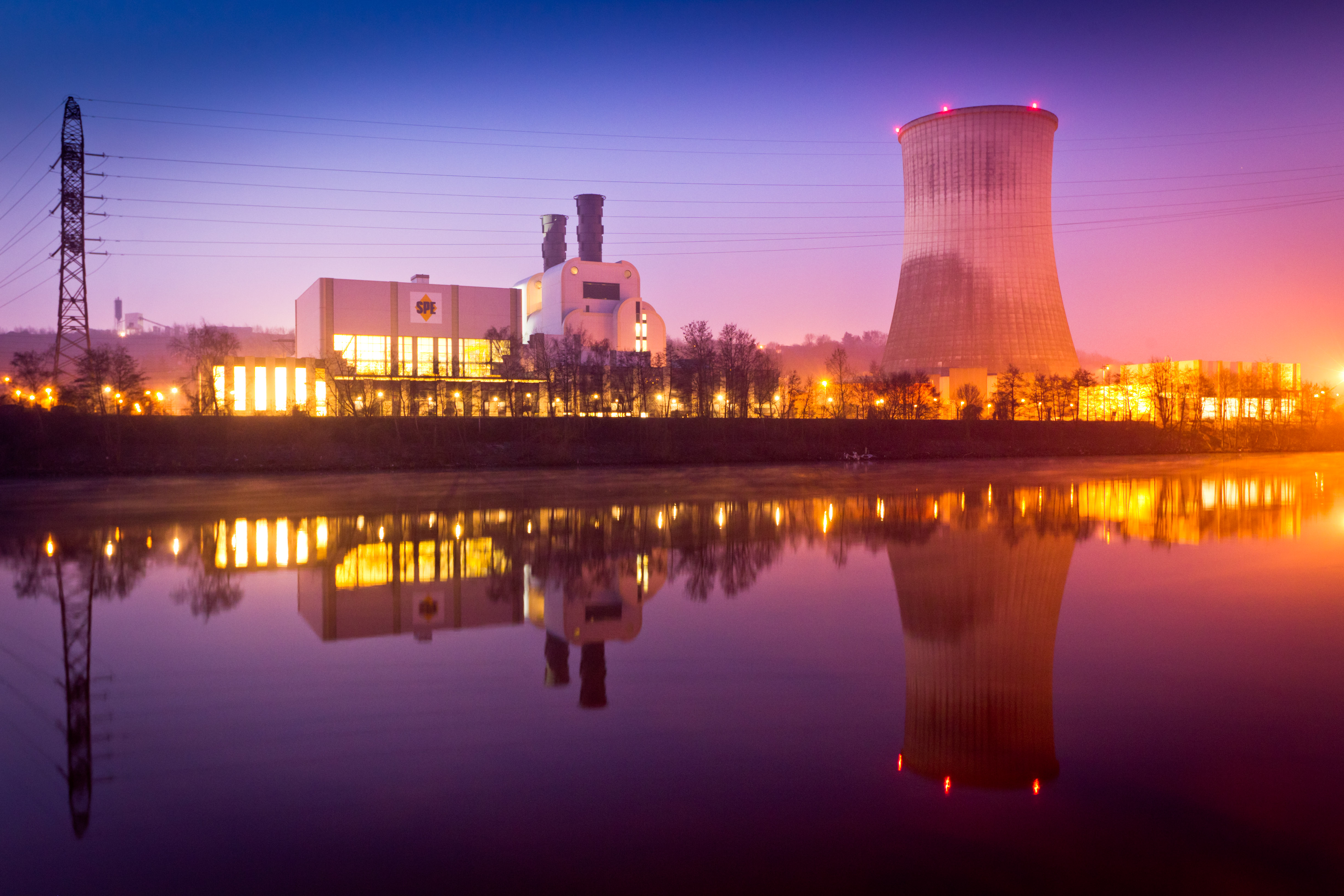
Thermal plant in Seraing

Luminus sells electricity and gas to 1.8 million private and professional customers, bringing its commercial market share to more than 20%. The company has approximately 2,000 employees. With an installed generation capacity of 2,090 MW, the company accounts for 14% of the national electricity generation.

Luminus owns gas-fired power plants (both CCGT and classic thermal power), wind farms and hydraulic power stations on various sites in Wallonia and Flanders. The company also owns stakes in nuclear plants. It operates CCGT plants at Angleur, Ghent-Ringvaart and Seraing, and classic thermal plants in Angleur, Gent-Ham, Izegem and Monsin. Until March 2012, Luminus also exploited a classic thermal plant in Harelbeke. Luminus' seven hydroelectric power plants are located on Meuse and Sambre rivers. The company is Belgium's #1 in terms of onshore wind energy (189 wind turbines, with a total capacity of 448 MW.

== See also ==
- Energy in Belgium
