= Dessel =

- Municipality
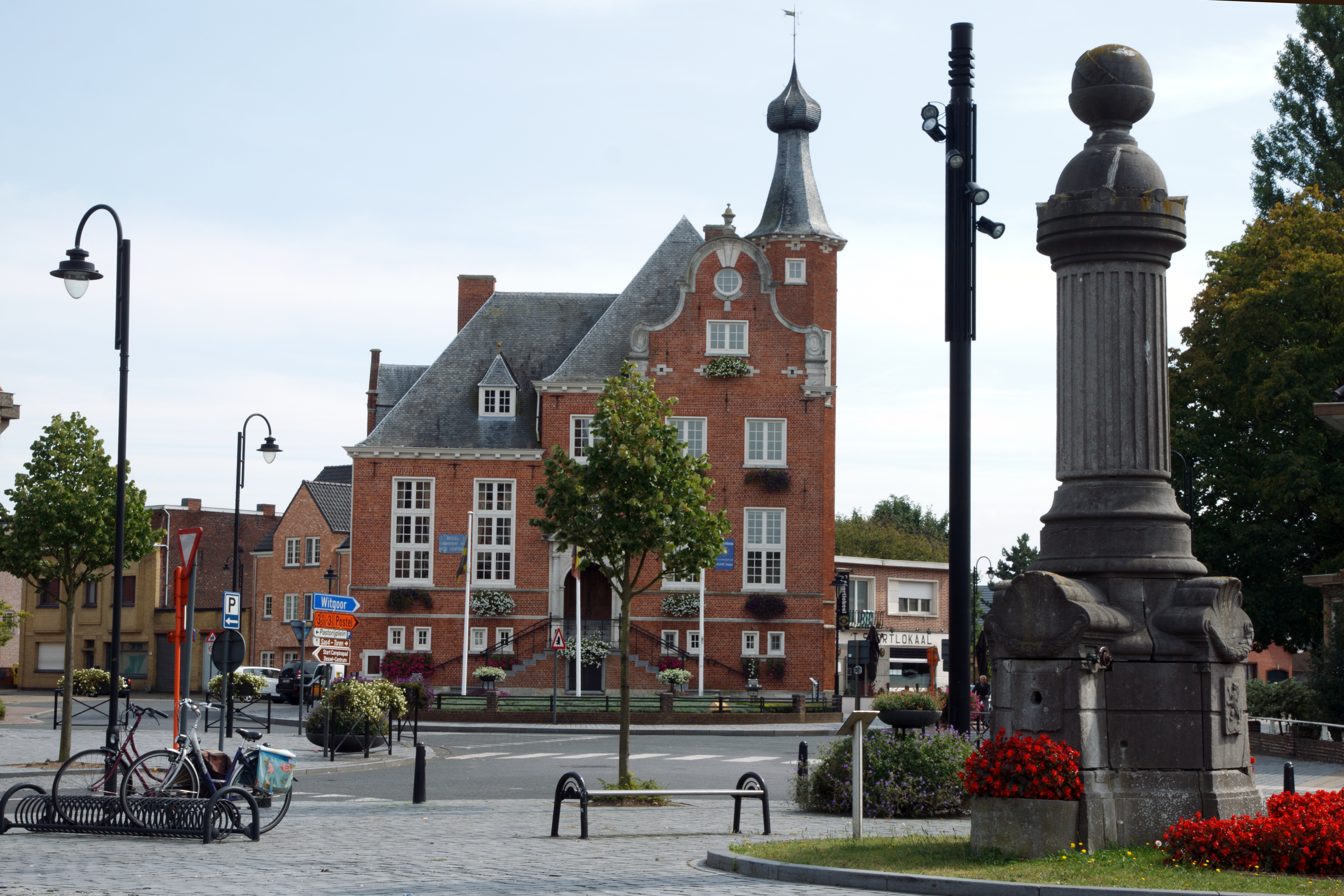

- Flag Coat of arms

- Location of Dessel in the province of Antwerp
- Interactive map of Dessel
- Location in Belgium
- Coordinates: 51°14′N 05°07′E
- Country: Belgium
- Community: Flemish Community
- Region: Flemish Region
- Province: Antwerp
- Arrondissement: Turnhout

Government
  - Mayor: Kris Van Dijck (N-VA)
  - Governing party: N-VA

Area
  - Total: 27.45 km^{2} (10.60 sq mi)

Population (2020-01-01)
  - Total: 9,605
  - Density: 349.9/km^{2} (906.3/sq mi)
- Postal codes: 2480
- NIS code: 13006
- Area codes: 014
- Website: www.dessel.be

Dessel (Dutch pronunciation: [ˈdɛsəl]) is a municipality located in the Belgian province of Antwerp. The municipality comprises only the town of Dessel proper. In 2021, Dessel had a total population of 9,659 inhabitants. The total area is 27.03 km^{2}.

== Nuclear industries ==
Dessel hosts several nuclear facilities:

- Belgoprocess, ex Eurochemic reprocessing plant (OECD), now in charge of the operational waste management for Ondraf/Niras.
- BelgoNucléaire, an old MOX factory, presently closed and to be decommissioned in the future.
- Franco-Belge de Fabrication du Combustible (FBFC) making nuclear fuel assemblies;
- The Dessel site was selected in June 2006 by the Belgian government to construct the first shallow land disposal facility for low-level radioactive waste in Belgium. The decision was taken after consultation of the local authorities and the population in the frame of the Stola consultation group.

== Sport ==
The town has two football clubs:

- K.F.C. Witgoor Sport, which plays in the Belgian Fourth Division.
- K.F.C. Dessel Sport, which plays in the Belgian Third Division.

== Event ==
- Graspop Metal Meeting, yearly heavy metal festival.

== Climate ==
Climate data for Dessel (1991−2020 normals)
Month	Jan	Feb	Mar	Apr	May	Jun	Jul	Aug	Sep	Oct	Nov	Dec	Year
Mean daily maximum °C (°F)	6.4 (43.5)	7.4 (45.3)	11.2 (52.2)	15.6 (60.1)	19.2 (66.6)	22.0 (71.6)	24.0 (75.2)	23.7 (74.7)	20.1 (68.2)	15.4 (59.7)	10.2 (50.4)	6.8 (44.2)	15.2 (59.3)
Daily mean °C (°F)	3.5 (38.3)	3.9 (39.0)	6.7 (44.1)	10.0 (50.0)	13.8 (56.8)	16.6 (61.9)	18.7 (65.7)	18.2 (64.8)	14.9 (58.8)	11.1 (52.0)	6.9 (44.4)	4.1 (39.4)	10.7 (51.3)
Mean daily minimum °C (°F)	0.6 (33.1)	0.4 (32.7)	2.2 (36.0)	4.3 (39.7)	8.3 (46.9)	11.3 (52.3)	13.3 (55.9)	12.6 (54.7)	9.7 (49.5)	6.9 (44.4)	3.7 (38.7)	1.4 (34.5)	6.2 (43.2)
Average precipitation mm (inches)	69.1 (2.72)	63.5 (2.50)	56.6 (2.23)	42.5 (1.67)	59.2 (2.33)	75.0 (2.95)	80.7 (3.18)	80.0 (3.15)	64.1 (2.52)	65.9 (2.59)	72.6 (2.86)	87.7 (3.45)	816.9 (32.15)
Average precipitation days (≥ 1.0 mm)	12.6	11.4	10.9	8.4	9.8	10.2	10.9	11.2	10.0	11.0	12.5	13.8	132.7
Mean monthly sunshine hours	61	77	132	184	213	212	218	204	160	116	66	50	1,693
Source: Royal Meteorological Institute

== Gallery ==
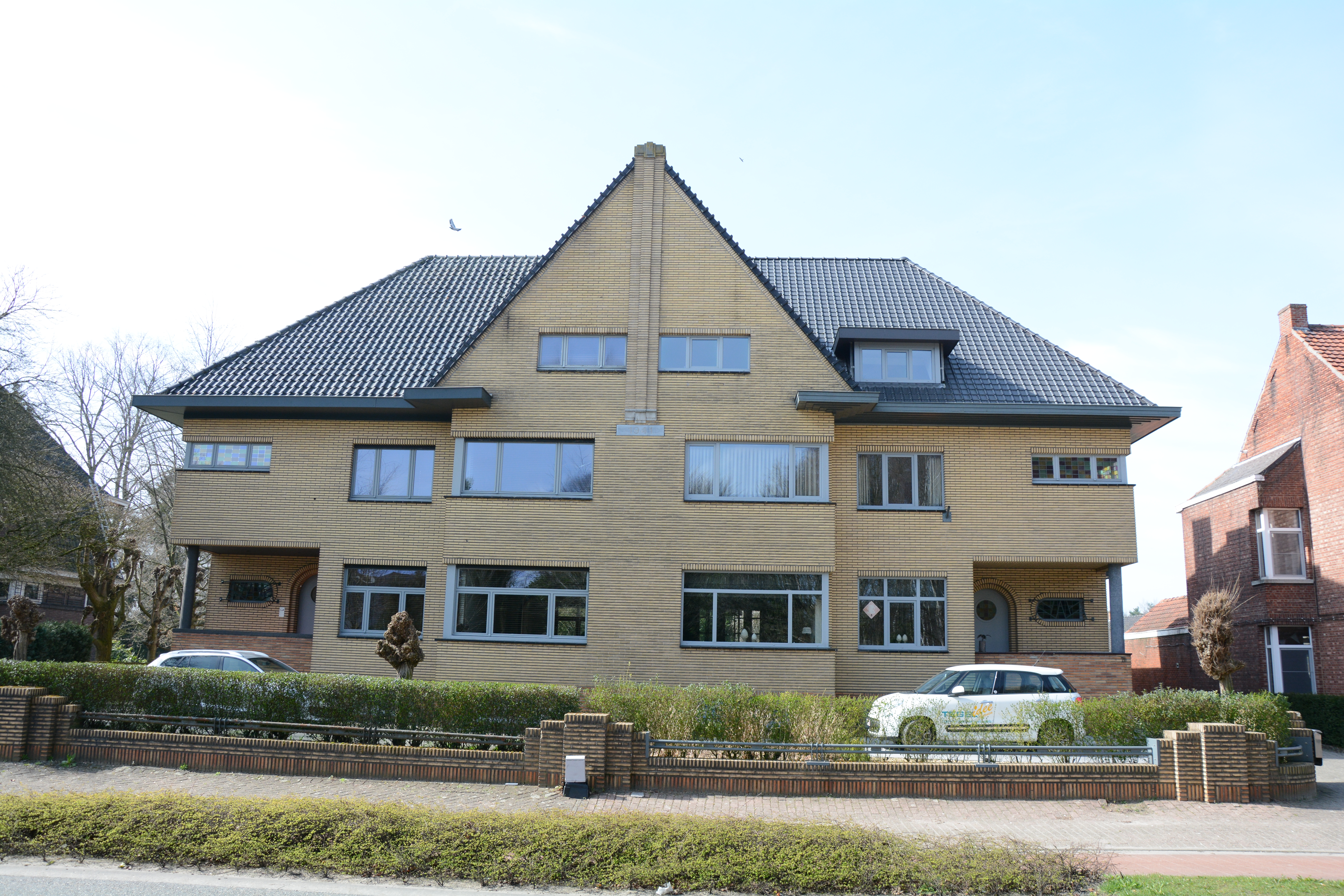
House in Dessel

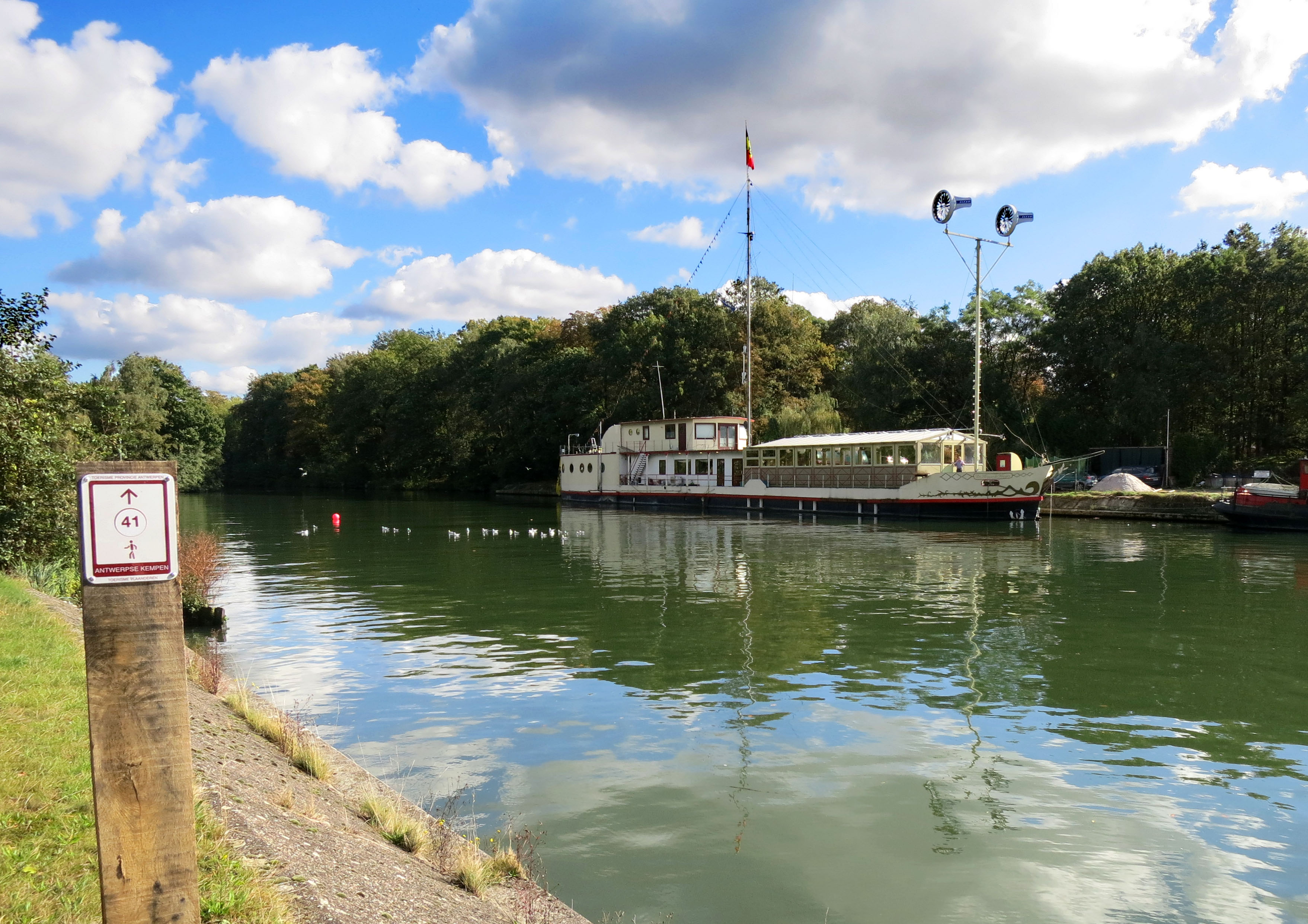
Canal of Mol

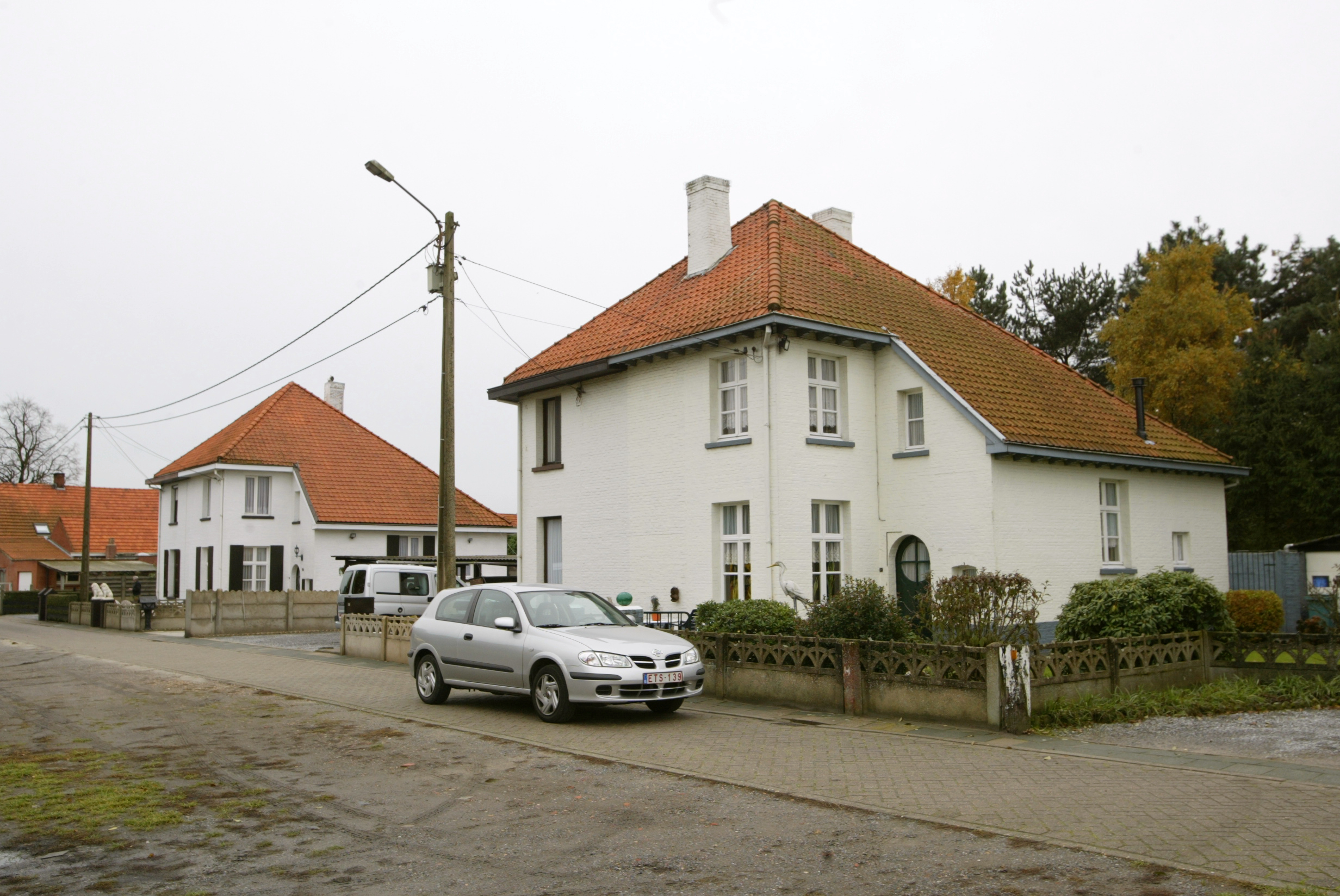
Street view

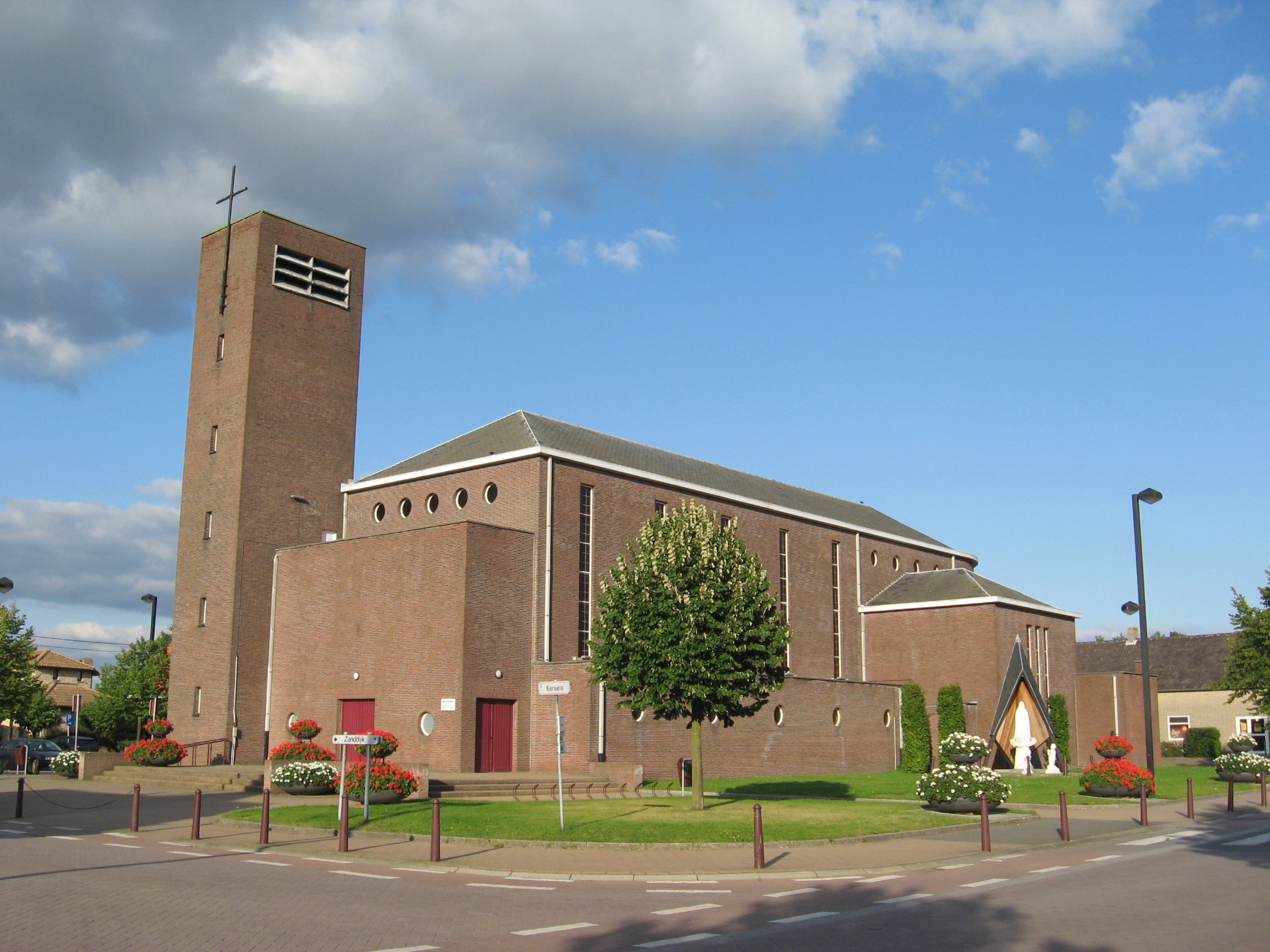
Holy Family Church in Witgoor
