= Cigéo =

French project of deep geological disposal of radioactive waste

Cigéo (an acronym for Centre Industriel de Stockage Géologique, or Industrial Centre for Geological Disposal) is a French project to construct a deep geological repository for radioactive waste. It is designed to store approximately 83000 m^{3} of high-level waste (HLW) and intermediate-level waste (ILW) produced by French nuclear facilities, including during their decommissioning, and by nuclear reprocessing of spent fuel.

The Agence nationale pour la gestion des déchets radioactifs (Andra) manages the project. After over thirty years of research, including at the Meuse/Haute Marne Underground Research Laboratory, Andra applied in 2023 to the French nuclear safety authority (ASN) for construction authorization. The facility is planned near the border of the Meuse and Haute-Marne departments, within the communes of Ribeaucourt, Bure, Mandres-en-Barrois, and Bonnet, in the drainage basin of the Seine, near the Meuse watershed. The waste will be stored in a layer of clay to ensure long-term containment.

The principle of geological disposal was enshrined in French law in 2006. A 2013 public debate concluded that disposal was not urgent and the project timeline required revision. The law also defines alternatives, such as long-term storage or transmutation of waste into radioisotopes with shorter half-lives.

Estimated costs range from 15 to 36 billion euros, with financing primarily the responsibility of waste producers but partly supported by the state budget. Social acceptability is a key challenge, with one billion euros spent to address public concerns. Two departmental Public Interest Groups (GIPs) support the project: the Haute-Marne GIP, chaired by Nicolas Lacroix, and the Meuse GIP, chaired by Jérôme Dumont, presidents of their respective departmental councils.

Since 1996, Cigéo has faced controversies over funding, the reversibility of disposal, uncertainties about containment over 100000 years, the volume of waste, and the perceived legitimacy of public debates.

== Storage of long-lived radioactive waste ==
=== Objectives of storage ===
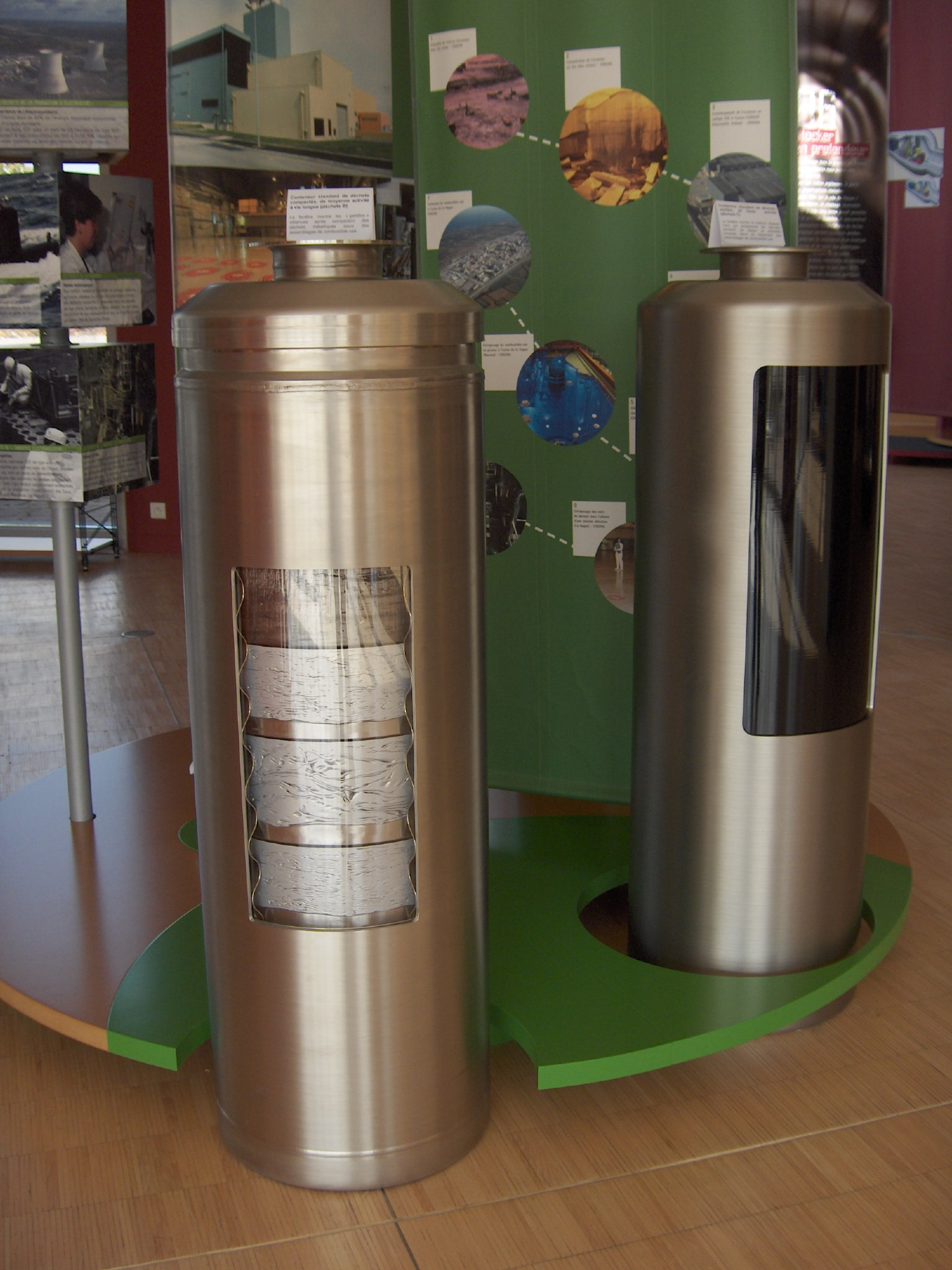
Models of standard containers for HLW (right) and ILW (left)

The activities of nuclear facilities generate fission products with very high levels of radioactivity and lifetimes in the tens of millennia. Additionally, there are actinides that are less radioactive but have lifetimes in the millions of years, such as neptunium-237, which has a half-life of 2.1 million years, fission products with lower activity such as iodine-129 (half-life of 16 million years), and activation products such as chlorine-36 (half-life of 300000 years). These elements are non-reusable nuclear wastes. In nuclear reprocessing, they are separated from uranium and plutonium, which are potentially reusable.

The strategy for management of long-lived HLW (whether fission products, actinides or activation products) consists of isolating them in places inaccessible to humans for long enough for their radiotoxicity to reduce, the principal challenge residing in the capacity of the facility to contain the radionuclides for a sufficiently long time by means of different barriers placed between the waste and ecosystems on the surface. One of the options currently retained consists of storing the waste at a depth of 300–500 meters in vaults dug out in a geological layer that is stable, dense and as impervious as possible (e.g. granite, volcanic tuff, or clay, as is envisaged in France). The radiation from a large proportion of these wastes will be reduced by a factor of 1,000 in roughly a thousand years.

The dangers of irradiation are poorly quantified for low doses, but according to the international authorities on radioprotection (United Nations Scientific Committee on the Effects of Atomic Radiation (UNSCEAR), International Commission on Radiological Protection (ICRP)), the effect is negligible for doses at similar levels to natural background radiation (on the order of a micro-Sievert per hour, or 5mSv/year). On the other hand, according to the IRSN, the radiological impact on people and ecosystems should be evaluated equally in the short or very long term. Underground storage allows the containment of radioactivity over the very long term: groundwater flow being very weak in the impermeable region, only certain mobile radionuclides are able to migrate over a period of tens of millennia, potentially reaching the surface only in extremely small quantities.

Two doctoral theses in 2008 and 2011 on archeological glasses and obsidians estimate that the vitrification process used to immobilize HLW should by itself be capable of assuring containment of radioactive materials for 10000 years. Nevertheless, for the evaluation of performance of geological disposal, migration models do not take credit for artificial confinement (the containers); only the natural rock is considered. The example of the natural nuclear fission reactors in the Oklo Mine, where non-volatile fission products have only migrated some centimeters in nearly 2 billion years, was used in preparatory works for Yucca Mountain nuclear waste repository to show that confinement over such timescales is possible.

According to a 2017 thesis in the history of science at the School for Advanced Studies in the Social Sciences (EHESS), Andra has had to retreat little by little from attempting to produce a formal proof of the absolute safety of disposal to instead presenting a body of arguments demonstrating that the evolution of Cigéo is controlled in the very long-term.

=== Study of Callovo-Oxfordian clay ===
Geological cross-section of Bure site.

The region proposed by Andra for the location of Cigéo is in the East of France, at the boundary of the departments of Meuse and Haute-Marne.

Safety performance of a geological disposal site is dependent, among other factors, on the characteristics of the host rock. The geological layer planned for the location of the wastes is the "Callovo-Oxfordian." It consists of a layer of clay rock, about 160 million years old, situated at a depth of around 500 m in the East of the Paris basin (between 420 and 555 m depth at the site of the Bure laboratory. The argilites (a mix of clay and quartz from the Callovo-Oxfordian stages of the Jurassic) possess physico-chemical characteristics which tend to limit the migration of radionuclides. The clay layer, with a thickness of more than 130 m and at a depth of 500 m has revealed excellent containment properties: stable for at least 100 million years, homogenous over several hundred km^{2}, the region has very low permeability and is resistant to groundwater flow (the principal cause of degradation of waste containers and dispersion of radionuclides), and the clay has an elevated retention capacity (capacity for sorption of radioactive elements).

During operation of the facility, Andra is aiming at a maximum acceptable dose of 0.25 mSv/year for the public and 5 mSv/year for monitored workers, which is a quarter of the current regulatory limit. For long term, the objective is that the committed dose must remain lower than 0.25 mSv/year for the most affected reference group. Modelled estimates of the dose peak at the 0.0008 mSv/year at the end of 500000 years (dominated by iodine-129 and chlorine-36, which are both soluble); while staying significantly under the objective the dose would be higher (0.02 mSv/year) in the case of hypothetical disposal of "CU1" and "CU2" spent fuel from EdF.

The goal of the Meuse/Haute Marne Underground Research Laboratory was the study of the clay layer, with a view to determining if its characteristics are consistent with the safety objectives of a disposal facility located in the transposition zone.

Andra's work has permitted to show evidence that the properties of the Callovo-Oxfordian argillites will strongly reduce the mobility of actinides and thus the activity flux out of the host rock formation, by confining them in the near field. The ASN nevertheless underlined the necessity of taking into account the residual uncertainties regarding the homogeneity of the clay layer. These uncertainties have been cited by the France Nature Environnement association in justifying its opposition to the project.

== Description of the project ==
=== General description ===
The planned facility is composed of surface facilities, notably for receipt and preparation of waste packages or support services for excavation and construction works.

It is envisaged that the wastes will be placed in underground stores situated at a depth of around 500 m, in a layer of clay rock which should be impermeable and have properties which support confinement over the very long term. A funicular railway should enable the waste packages to be taken underground or returned to the surface. The design and eventual construction, maintenance and operation of the funicular have been entrusted to the Grenoble-based Poma, a specialist in cable lifts, for a cost of 68 M€ and with a potential start of operations in 2025 (if the facility is constructed by that point).

Having entered the pre-industrial phase in 2011, the Cigéo project could accept its first waste packages in 2025, after a series of stages and a calendar defined by law. It is planned to operate Cigéo for at least 100 years. The underground disposal tunnels will be constructed progressively, as and when needed. Their footprint will extend to around 15 km^{2} after about 100 years of operations.

The law requires that the waste disposal will be reversible for a minimum of 100 years. in order to allow future generations the possibility of modifying or adjusting to disposal process, for example by removal of the stored packages if another "mode of management" is planned or if the safety of the site is called into question. It is not, however, planned to make financial provision to cover some or all of the cost of such a reversal operation.

=== Wastes destined for Cigéo ===
Cigéo was conceived for the disposal of high-level waste, and long-lived intermediate-level (LL-ILW) waste which could not be disposed of in surface or near-surface disposal facilities for reasons of nuclear safety or radiation protection. For high-level wastes, the dose rate at 1 meter from an unshielded package can be multiple Sieverts per hour at the time of disposal.

The wastes are conditioned in "parcels" by their producer before being placed in a disposal container. The estimated volumes of wastes for disposal at Cigéo are:

- approximately 10000 m^{3} conditioned HLW (approx. 60000 parcels), on the order of 30000 m^{3} containers;
- approximately 70000 m^{3} LL-ILW (approx. 180000 parcels), on the order of 350000 m^{3} containers.

The inventory considered by Andra for the conception of the Cigéo project only takes into account nuclear installations that were authorized (or were on the point of being authorized) on 31 December 2010, for a projected operational period of 50 years. However, for waste coming from the current operation of the fleet of nuclear power stations, Andra's reference inventory assumes that all spent fuels will ultimately be completely recycled (including MOX and enriched reprocessed uranium, which are not currently recycled). So, the adjournment of the complete recycling of all spent fuels would have a strong impact on the nature of waste to be stocked, but only towards the end of the century. If it were ultimately decided to dispose of untreated spent fuel in Cigéo, the design would have to be adapted accordingly and the footprint would be expected to increase to around 25 km^{2} (9.7 sq mi) (from around 15). Additionally, in the case of complete cessation of nuclear operations, separated plutonium (which could no longer be considered as a recyclable nuclear material but would rather be a waste) would add to the inventory to be taken into account. According to Hervé Kempf, of Reporterre, retreatment, which produces 5 types of wastes (minor actinides, plutonium, spent MOX, reprocessing uranium and spent uranium fuel), should be stopped, storage conditions at the la Hague site should be rediscussed and the project for a spent MOX fuel pool at Belleville-sur-Loire should likewise be rediscussed.

The disposal of wastes from future nuclear installations at Cigéo would be possible, provided they are compatible with the site authorization (in terms of volume, nature and level of activity. If the inventory to be taken into account exceeds the Cigéo's authorized limits, these should be changed by a modification of the authorization, the procedure for which would include a public inquiry.

The volumes to be stocked are closely dependent on energy policy, with an increase in the volume expected in the case of early closure of some power stations. The opponents of the project in the public debate in 2013 demanded the adjournment of debate until after the law on the energy transition program, while ASN recommended, because of these uncertainties, that these "expansion hypotheses" are taken into account.

=== Reversibility of emplacement ===
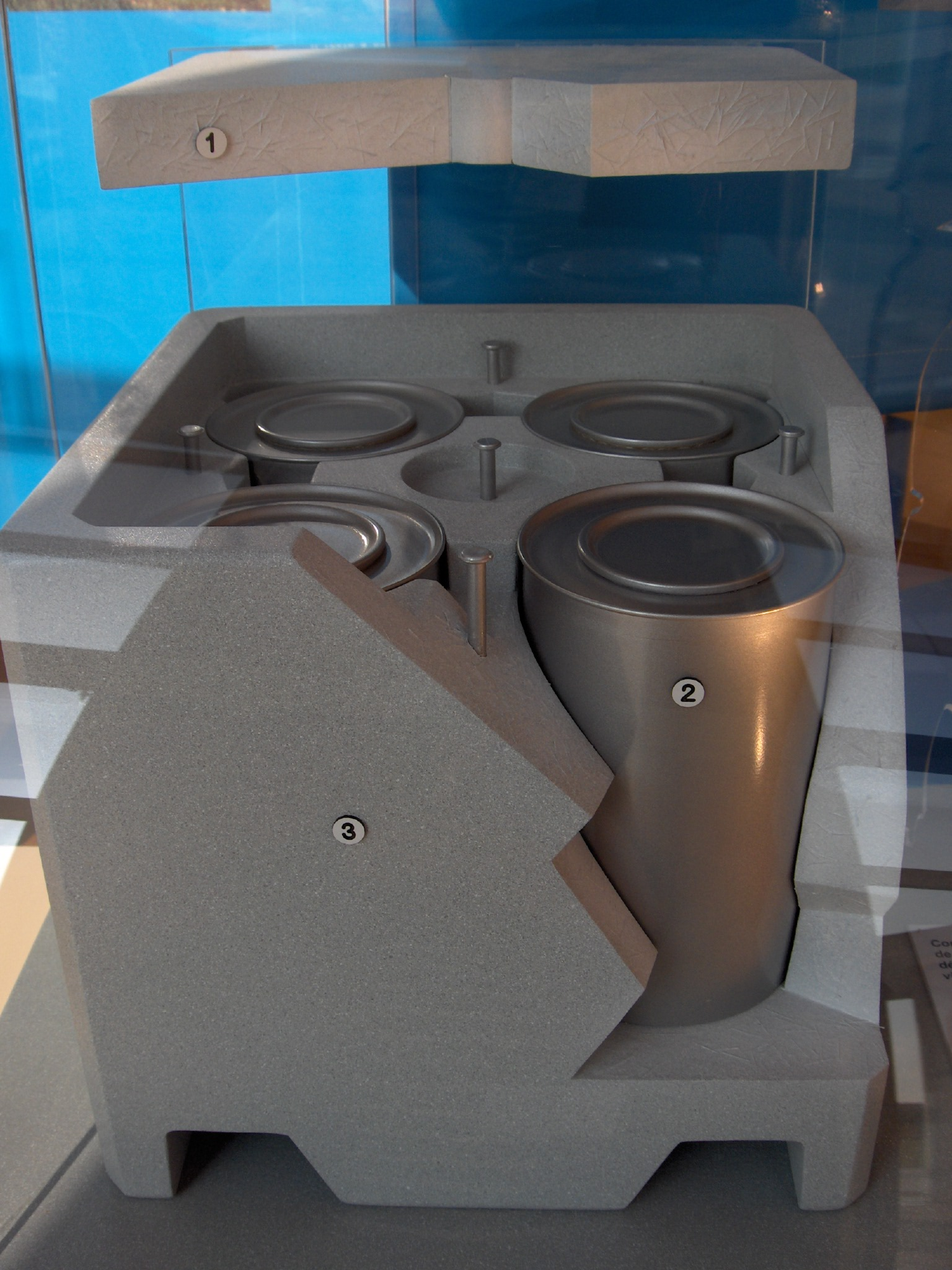
Concrete container for disposal of LL-ILW.

In order to allow future generations the possibility of revisiting the choice for disposal, the law on the radioactive waste program states that disposal shall be reversible, as a means of precaution.

The conditions of reversibility are not fixed a priori; they must be discussed during the public debate. After the public debate, the Government will present a bill setting out these conditions, leading to a parliamentary debate; Only then can the authorization to construct the storage center be issued. This authorization will fix the minimum period during which the reversibility of storage must be ensured; and this duration may not be less than one hundred years

The notion of "reversibility" is relative: it depends on the containers retaining their integrity and the stores being left accessible, but also on the price one is willing to pay for a retrieval operation. Containers which have been placed hundreds of meters below ground and left there for decades or even centuries could perhaps remain technically recoverable, but the cost of doing so under acceptable safety conditions might be prohibitive. Thus, reversibility is considered in progressive stages, including conditioning in containers, emplacement, closure of cells, end of active operations in a storage gallery, backfilling of the gallery, through to the definitive closure of the center. Each step taken makes reversal a little more difficult and expensive.

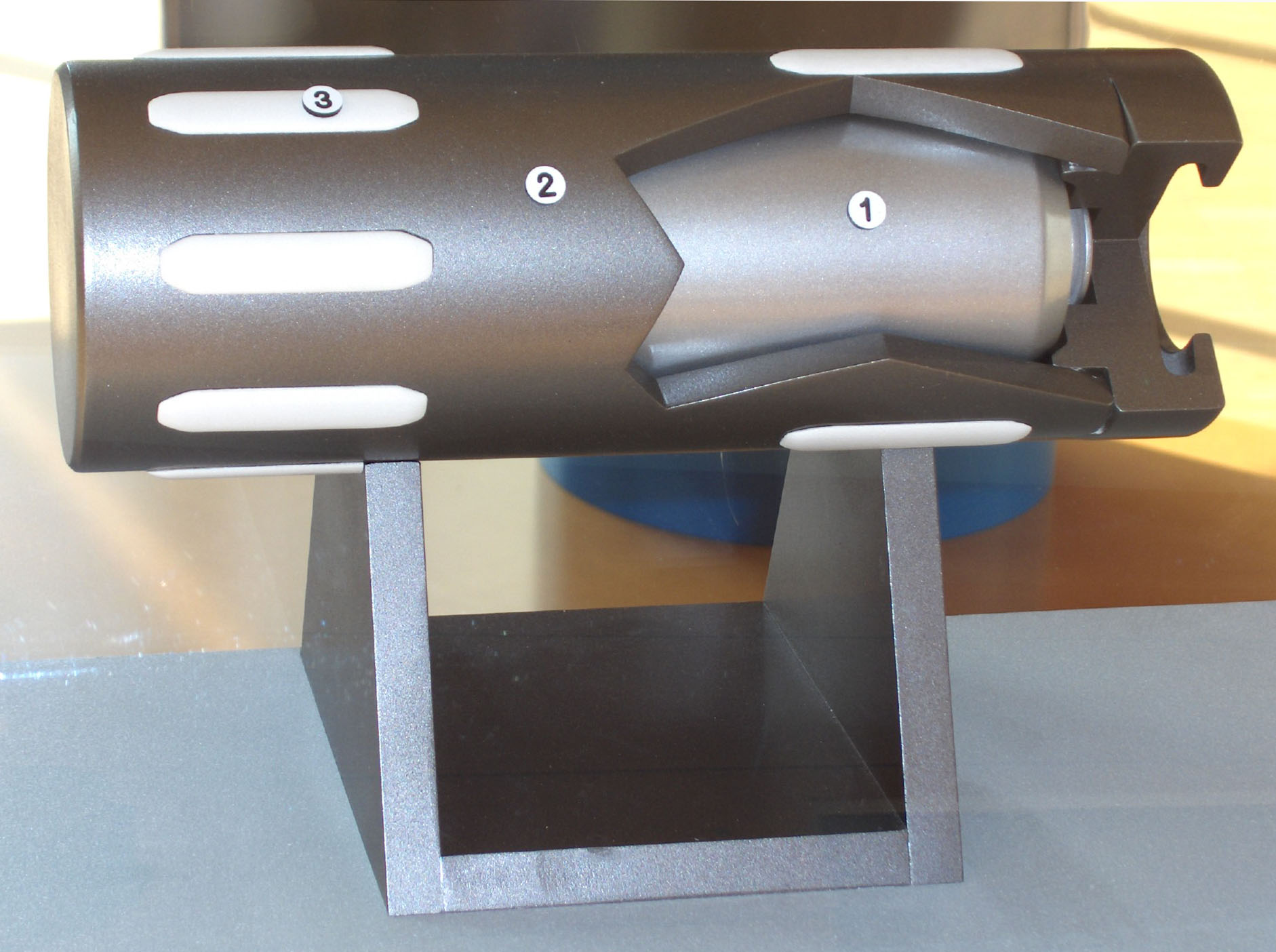
Model of a storage container for LL-HLW (1). Ceramic skates (3) are indicated. These are designed to facilitate possible future extraction.

Reversibility must be taken into account in the design of the facility: which must facilitate the safe recovery of waste packages, despite the depth, for as long as the facility is not fully closed. To make this recovery possible "in complete safety":

- containers and storage facilities must be so constructed as to be durable for at least the entire life of the storage facility, to allow easy access to waste packages;
- the automated devices designed to place waste containers in storage facilities must be equally durable but also capable of removing these containers.

These devices and their maintenance obviously have a cost, all the more important as the requirements for reversibility will be onerous. The question of financing this reversibility is part of the global reflection of intergenerational responsibility. The option taken by the actors of the project is for current generations to finance the laboratory, construction, operation and closure of Cigéo, since only they have chosen this storage method.

For Andra,

the concept of the Cigéo project is flexible and evolutionary. If necessary, it could accept untreated spent fuel. The first packages to reach the site will be LL-ILW; the question of the final sealing or not of the first cell arises around 2045. And the storage of the first vitrified packages of HA waste will not take place before 2075.

Some commentators, such as Jean-Marc Jancovici, believe that reversibility leads to undue complexity.

=== Cost of deep geological storage and sources of financing ===
Evaluation of the total cost of Cigéo must take into account all the costs of storage over more than 100 years: studies, construction of the first structures (surface buildings, shafts, declines (sloped tunnels)), operation (staff, maintenance, energy...), the gradual construction of underground structures, then their closure, their monitoring, etc. Part of these costs/investments will be the salaries of the workforce employed in the digging, construction and storage work, who, according to Andra, will number 1500 to 2000 persons for at least a hundred years.

- In 2003, Andra published a first estimate of the cost, based on technical concepts from 2002. Several scenarios were selected, with costs ranging from €15.9 billion to €55 billion depending on the reprocessing options chosen.
- In 2009, Andra sent producers a new design dossier and a new estimate (known as "SI 2009") of the cost of deep storage, then estimated at €33.8 billion in 2008 Euros (€35.9 billion in 2010 Euros). This version included an increase in the inventory to be stored, and technical developments to better take into account the requirements of safety and reversibility.
- In 2013, Andra had to make a new estimate. On the basis of the technical outline refined at the beginning of 2013, and after an initial optimisation exercise, the estimate amounted to €28 billion (in 2013 Euros) at the end of 2013, excluding research, insurance and tax expenditure, i.e. a substantially identical amount at constant perimeter. (Note: On the same basis, Andra's 2009 estimate would increase to €29.6 billion in 2013 Euros, and the 2005 estimate by the direction générale de l'Énergie et des Matières premières (DGEMP) would increase to close to €20 billion in 2013 Euros.) Optimisation avenues still need to be investigated between Andra and producers to refine this costing.
- In November 2013, Andra stated during a public debate that this re-evaluation would not be submitted to the government until 2014. After collecting the comments of waste producers and the opinion of the Nuclear Safety Authority, the Minister responsible for energy must adopt the assessment of the costs and make it public.
- In January 2016, the cost was officially set at €25 billion by the Ministry of Ecology and Sustainable Development, in charge of energy. (Note: Order of January 15, 2016 on the objective cost of implementing long-term management solutions for high-level and long-lived intermediate-level radioactive waste. JORF No. 0014 of January 17, 2016. Article 1.)

The cost will theoretically be financed by waste producers (EdF, the CEA and Areva (now Orano)), through agreements with Andra, which will constitute a "fund intended to finance the construction, operation, permanent shutdown, maintenance and monitoring of storage or storage facilities for high- or intermediate-level long-lived waste." For a new nuclear reactor over its entire operating life, this cost represents in the order of 1 to 2% of the total cost of electricity production.

=== Safety expectations of the Nuclear Safety Authority ===
In France, any entity planning to establish or operate a nuclear installation (Note: An installation nucléaire de base (INB), or nuclear installation, is a French regulatory denomination for a fixed nuclear facility (as opposed to a mobile facility such as a naval propulsion reactor).) must file a "Safety Options Case."

ASN published a safety guide for final geological disposal of radioactive waste in 2008 and issued several opinions on the file before the 2013 public inquiry (whose conclusions were issued at the beginning of 2014).

After the public debate on the project (end of 2013), Andra announced its intention to begin operations in 2025 with a "pilot industrial phase" of 5 to 10 years, preceding the main operational phase. (Note: Deliberation of the Board of Directors of the Agence nationale pour la gestion des déchets radioactifs of May 5, 2014 on the follow-up to the public debate on the Cigéo project.) It also indicated that it would submit a safety options file to ASN in 2015, including documents on technical recoverability options, draft specifications for package acceptance, and a master plan for operations.

On 20 January 2015, ASN responded by outlining its expectations, which include:

- full site coverage (surface, underground, and connections),
- self-supporting structures,
- clear articulation of safety objectives and principles at all phases of the facility lifecycle (design, construction, operation, shutdown, dismantling or closure, maintenance, monitoring),
- reversibility in the broad sense (as defined by the OECD), encompassing:
1. adaptability of the facility during its development,
2. recoverability of waste over a defined period, including in scenarios involving inaccessibility, containment failure, or structural degradation. (Note: Reversibility of decisions and retrievability of radioactive waste, food for thought for national geological disposal programs published by the OECD Nuclear Energy Agency (NEA) as part of the international “Reversibility and Retrievability” project conducted from 2007 to 2011.)

ASN also required information on Andra’s subcontracting policy and an initial draft of the technical capabilities notice provided for in Article II of the 2007 decree, with additional requirements listed in an annex to the letter.

ASN’s opinion on the safety options case, published on 15 January 2018, confirmed the project's "satisfactory technological maturity" but also highlighted concerns from IRSN regarding bituminized waste—accounting for 16% of total volume and 18% of packages—which presents fire risks. ASN proposed two possible solutions: inerting the waste (e.g., via pyrolysis) or modifying the facility’s design to mitigate the risk of chain reactions in case of fire.

=== The problem of discounting and the stability of financing ===
In accordance with the 2006 law on radioactive wastes, producers are legally obliged to evaluate the long-term costs posed by their wastes and to set aside funds to meet those costs. These expenses are not accounted for in "gross value", but are discounted: dedicated assets are invested and earn financial interest. If, for example, the interest rate is 3.04%, a euro invested today will theoretically yield 1.0304^100=20 € after a century, which makes it possible to balance an expenditure twenty times higher in a hundred years' time.

One difficulty raised by opponents of the project is that, due to this discounting process, the provisions made by waste producers only partially cover the future costs of the storage centre, with the remainder expected to come from investment returns. High discount rates (5% and/or 3%) allow operators to allocate only €5 billion for the Cigéo project, although it is expected to cost at least seven times more. Critics fear that if these provisions prove insufficient, "our children will inherit only the waste."

This objection is based on the ability of financial investments to perform over the long term. However, the discount rate used by waste producers is not fixed, but is itself constrained: "it cannot exceed the rate of return, as expected with a high degree of confidence, of the hedging assets, managed with a degree of security and liquidity sufficient to meet their purpose" and must be assessed annually. If the financial return is lower than expected, producers must reassess their charges upward, which can unbalance their expense accounts. In such cases, "the administrative authority identifies deficiencies or inadequacies in the evaluation of costs, the calculation of provisions, or their amount, and may prescribe the necessary measures to regularize the situation, specifying deadlines for implementation."

Operators are then required to increase provisions to rebalance their long-term expense accounts. The State has decided not to cover the CEA's expenses from its own assets, but will ensure its financing through the budget; for operators whose costs are mainly long-term, the deadline for complying with this coverage rule was extended from 2011 to 2014.

== History ==
=== Law of 30 December 1991 ===
The Law of 30 December 1991 on research into the management of radioactive waste organizes 15 years of research on managing high-level and long-lived radioactive waste, focusing on three methods:

- Separation and transmutation of long-lived radioactive elements;
- Reversible or irreversible storage in deep geological formations, including through underground laboratories;
- Conditioning and long-term surface storage processes.

The law mandates that within 15 years, the government will submit a comprehensive report to Parliament, accompanied by a draft law authorizing, if necessary, the creation of a storage center for high-level and long-lived radioactive waste.

=== Developments from 1992 to 2005 ===
In 1992, a call for applications to host underground laboratories received 30 applications from 11 departments: Allier, Gard, Indre, Maine-et-Loire, Marne, Haute-Marne, Meurthe-et-Moselle, Meuse, Var, Vendée, and Vienne. By late 1993, four departments were selected: Gard, Vienne, Meuse, and Haute-Marne.

In 1998, following geological and public inquiries, the Lionel Jospin government chose to build a single laboratory in Bure. From 1999 to 2004, the Bure underground laboratory was constructed. In 2005, Andra published the "Argile 2005" dossier, summarizing 15 years of research and experiments in the laboratory, concluding that storage in a geological clay layer was feasible, pending further research.

In January 2006, the National Commission for the Evaluation of Research on the Management of Radioactive Waste (CNE), established under the 1991 law, published a report recommending reversible deep geological disposal as the reference method for managing final waste and continued research at the Bure laboratory.

=== Law of 28 June 2006 ===
The 2006 law outlined the authorization process for Cigéo, requiring:

1. Public Debate
  Launched on 15 May 2013 by the National Commission for Public Debate, it included 15 public meetings from 15 May to 15 October 2013, featuring expert interventions and a participatory website for public input. The debate aimed to:
  - Inform the public about Cigéo’s industrial design, safety, reversibility, location, and monitoring;
  - Gather opinions on its objectives, modalities, characteristics, and impacts;
  - Advise the State on the decision.
  By mid-December, the Special Committee on Public Debate (CPDP) would publish a report, with the National Commission for Public Debate (CNDP) summarizing the findings. Andra would then have three months to outline its project’s next steps based on the debate’s outcomes.
2. Authorization Request
  Submission by the Andra in 2015;
3. Review and Authorization (2015–2018)
  Evaluation by competent authorities, input from local governments, a law on storage reversibility, a public inquiry, and potential authorization to proceed.

Andra’s solutions undergo independent oversight:

- The National Evaluation Commission (CNE) ensures technical feasibility and performance, reporting annually to Parliament and the government.
- The French Nuclear Safety Authority (ASN) ensures compliance with radiation protection and safety regulations, supported by the Institute for Radiation Protection and Nuclear Safety (IRSN) and expert groups.
- A Local Information and Monitoring Committee (CLIS) reviews information and consultation processes.
- Parliament oversees progress via the Parliamentary Office for the Evaluation of Scientific and Technological Options (OPECST).

The application for Cigéo’s creation, initially planned for 2018, was postponed to mid-2019.

=== Debates and controversies ===
In early 2013, the National Commission for Public Debate (CNDP) prepared for discussions on the Cigéo storage site project. On 4 February 2013, Minister of Ecology Delphine Batho visited the Bure underground laboratory, and on 6 February, she approved Andra’s dossier for the public debate, scheduled from 15 May to 31 July and 31 August to 15 October 2013. Andra’s director emphasized that no final decision had been made for the Meuse and Haute-Marne storage site, requiring approval from the French Nuclear Safety Authority (ASN) and local consent, which had not yet been granted.

==== Boycott of the debates ====
On 15 May 2013, approximately 40 organizations, including Bure Zone Libre, Friends of the Earth, and the Sortir du nucléaire Network, called for a boycott, alleging predetermined outcomes. On 23 May and 18 June, opponents disrupted the debates, leading to the suspension of the 23 May session after 15 minutes by Committee Chairman Claude Bernet. The CNDP expressed regret that participants were denied their rights to information and expression. The Haut comité pour la transparence et l'information sur la sécurité nucléaire (HCTISN) condemned these disruptions as obstacles to democratic processes.

A survey in Meuse and Haute-Marne showed 83% of residents supported opponents’ participation in the debate, though 68% believed the debate’s conclusions were predetermined, while still valuing its role in raising awareness. Andra noted that public meetings were not legally required, and the CNDP proposed alternatives like online forums or a citizens’ conference. On 12 February 2014, CNDP President Christian Leyrit suggested initiating Cigéo with a pilot storage phase.

==== 2016 law and protests ====
In June 2015, the Conseil constitutionnel struck down an article on reversibility in the Macron law. This was incorporated into the Cigéo framework law adopted in July 2016. On 27 October 2023, the Constitutional Council upheld the reversibility provisions as constitutional, rejecting challenges from groups like Greenpeace and Sortir du nucléaire.

On 8 November 2017, at Andra’s request, the CNDP appointed guarantors Pierre Guinot-Delery and Jean-Michel Stievenard to support civil society engagement. Following one resignation and due to the project’s complexity, three guarantors were appointed on 6 June 2018: Jean-Michel Stievenard, Marie-Line Meaux, and Jean-Daniel Vazelle.

==== Intensification of protests and judicial response ====
From 2016, the Lejuc wood in Mandres-en-Barrois, a potential site for Cigéo, became a focal point of protest. Activists occupied the site, challenging a municipal council’s secret ballot authorizing its transfer to Andra. The ballot was annulled on 28 February 2017 by the Nancy Administrative Court for procedural flaws, but the council reconfirmed the decision on 18 May. (Note: Several local residents petitioned the Bar-le-Duc Regional Court to overturn this second decision, but their request was ruled inadmissible (L'Est républicain, Bar-le-Duc edition, November 22, 2019). This decision was confirmed on appeal on May 10, 2021 (L'Est républicain, May 12, 2021).) Activists continued occupying the wood until their eviction by gendarmes on 22 February 2018. The legality of the eviction remains contested due to ongoing legal challenges over the wood’s transfer. Subsequently, 150 tons of materials installed by activists were removed.

Protests occasionally turned violent, including an attempted arson at a hotel-restaurant near the laboratory, vandalism at the Bar-le-Duc courthouse, and threats against parliamentarians and journalists. Authorities responded with investigations into anti-nuclear activists in Bure for criminal association, using extensive surveillance methods, including telephone tapping. (Note: According to Mediapart (April 29, 2020), 29 people and places were tapped, 27 computers and 25 laptops seized and 37 pages of phone taps transcribed.) Reporterre and Mediapart described this as an "inordinate intelligence machine" costing approximately one million euros.

=== Prior opinions, authorizations and preparatory works ===
The public inquiry dossier for Cigéo was filed on 3 August 2020. On 13 January 2021, the Environmental Authority recommended a detailed program of additional risk management and monitoring studies, while the National Commission for Public Debate (CNDP) emphasized in-depth consultation on rehabilitating the Nançois-Tronville-Gondrecourt railway line. In February 2021, the General Secretariat for Investment issued a favorable opinion, noting the project’s “strong prudential and insurance value” but warning of a “significant and serious risk of cost drift.”

The updated dossier led to a public inquiry from 15 September to 23 October 2021. On 20 December, investigators issued an unreservedly favourable opinion on the declaration of public utility and urban planning compatibility. On 8 July 2022, a decree declared the public utility (DUP) of Cigéo, enabling Andra to acquire land through expropriation by 31 December 2037 for surface areas and 31 December 2050 for subsoil areas. On 1 December 2023, the Council of State reaffirmed the project’s public utility.

On 17 January 2023, Andra submitted the site creation authorisation application to the Ministry of Energy Transition, with the Nuclear Safety Authority given five years to review and decide. On 10 June 2024, the IRSN issued a positive opinion on Andra’s knowledge of waste packages, site, and rock for safety assessments but noted that Cigéo’s capacity is limited to waste from six planned EPR2 reactors. Additional reactors would require new authorization or a separate project. Concerns were raised about metal corrosion, rock homogeneity, and sealing structure design.

== See also ==
- Agence nationale pour la gestion des déchets radioactifs (Andra)
- Geology of France
- Radioactive waste disposal
- Meuse/Haute Marne Underground Research Laboratory
- France Nature Environnement
- Long-term nuclear waste warning messages
- public debate procedure: public debate procedure required for the project by French law

== Bibliography ==
- Bonneau, Pierre; d'Allens, Gaspard (2020). Cent mille ans. Bure ou le scandale enfoui des déchets nucléaires [One hundred thousand years. Bure, or the buried scandal of nuclear waste]. Illustrated by Cécile Guillard. La Revue dessinée - Seuil. ISBN 978-2-02-145982-1.
