= Nuclear waste management in France =

The management of radioactive waste in France is under the responsibility of the Agence nationale pour la gestion des déchets radioactifs (ANDRA). It is governed by the loi relative aux recherches sur la gestion des déchets radioactifs of 1991, amended in 2006 by the loi de programme relative à la gestion durable des matières et déchets radioactifs.

According to this law, a radioactive waste is a substance containing radionuclides, natural or artificial, whose specific activity or concentration justifies radiation protection control, and for which no further use is planned or foreseen. In France, the owner of the waste remains responsible for it and ensures its management, in accordance with the law.

The total volume of this waste was estimated by ANDRA at approximately 1,540,000 cubic metres (54,000,000 cu ft) at the end of 2016, of which only 3,650 metres (11,975.066 ft) consists of high-level and long-lived waste, the most hazardous. This total volume could reach, according to ANDRA's prospective scenarios, between 4,372,000 and 5,048,000 metres (14,343,832.021 and 16,561,679.790 ft) (including 10,000 to 32,500 metres (32,808.399 to 106,627.297 ft) of high-level waste) by the end of the decommissioning of facilities authorized as of the end of 2016.

== National plan for the management of radioactive materials and waste ==
According to the program law relating to the sustainable management of radioactive materials and waste of 2006, a radioactive waste is a substance containing radionuclides, natural or artificial, whose activity or concentration justifies radioprotection control, and for which no further use is planned or foreseen.

In France, the owner of the waste remains responsible for it and ensures its management, in accordance with the law. The management of radioactive waste is planned in a "National Plan for the Management of Radioactive Materials and Waste" (PNGMDR), updated every three years. This plan provides for differentiated waste management, adapted to their hazardousness and "radioactive lifespan", in five waste categories: high-level activity (0.2% of total volume in 2009), medium-level activity and long-lived (3.6% in 2009), low-level activity and long-lived (7.2% in 2009), low and medium-level activity and short-lived (68.8% in 2009), very low-level activity (20.1% in 2009, with a significant increase expected due to future decommissioning of facilities, with projects to integrate into the regulations the possibility of clearance of low-level radioactive materials. This coincides with the publication by the IAEA and the European Commission of new basic radiation protection standards (BSS) in 1996, which specify this concept).

The second version of the PNGMDR dates from 2010.

This plan combines two strategic axes: the processing of spent nuclear fuel, and the storage of "ultimate waste". The concept of ultimate and non-recoverable waste is not specific to the nuclear industry, but is common in the law of waste management in general. The "Loi Bataille" of 28 June 2006 distinguishes ultimate radioactive waste from recoverable radioactive materials (depleted uranium, irradiated fuel, uranium from reprocessing, plutonium reusable in MOX fuel, MOX, etc.). The release of liquid and gaseous radioactive effluents is not covered by this plan, but is governed by specific authorizations, as are mining residues currently regulated by radioprotection standards under mining law (under revision).

The third PNGMDR, for the period 2013–2015, was submitted to Parliament by the Government on 28 December 2012, prepared since 2007 under the auspices of the Nuclear Safety Authority and the ministry in charge of energy. It led to a decree on 27 December 2013. This plan integrates the requirements of the European directive of 19 July 2011 establishing a community framework for the responsible and safe management of spent fuel and radioactive waste. The plan emphasizes the need to develop comprehensive industrial management schemes and management methods for high-level and medium-level long-lived waste.

The 2016-2018 plan, opens new avenues, particularly regarding the long-term harmfulness of radioactive waste from a global environmental perspective, the long-term recovery prospects of certain radioactive materials, or the storage strategies implemented by operators pending the establishment of definitive management solutions.

The 2019-2021 plan, for the first time, was subject to a public debate organized by the Commission nationale du débat public. This public debate on the fifth edition of the PNGMDR took place from 17 April to 25 September 2019.

== History ==
The first radioactive waste came from the industrial use of radium, research, and medicine, followed by military and energy uses. The production and hazardousness of this waste have significantly increased from the 1940s to the present day.

Two types of waste are often distinguished:

- Upstream: waste from mines and quarries of uranium or other radioactive products (mining tailings, radioactive sludge, radon) related to the extraction of uranium or other radioactive substances (cobalt, for example). These are often low-radioactivity products but accumulated in large volumes and, for some (uranium), with very long lifespans.
- Downstream: waste from military and civilian nuclear sectors; often less voluminous but sometimes highly radioactive and chemically very toxic.

France, having prioritized the development of nuclear weapons and nuclear energy, faces significant tonnages of waste with short, medium, and long radioactive half-lives. Additionally, there is a growing number of used sealed radioactive sources (an issue to be studied from 2013 by a dedicated working group).

The management of this waste was initially handled, in a relatively opaque manner, by the CEA and military organizations. Then, faced with a significant increase in the volume and hazardousness of this waste, and in response to a demand for transparency from civil society, new organizations were created, including the ANDRA for waste management. Public reports were produced, including that of Pierre Desgraupes in 1991 on waste, followed by those of deputy Christian Bataille, which led to the Loi Bataille (Loi relative aux recherches sur la gestion des déchets radioactifs) of 1991 on nuclear matters, addressing the management, storage (potentially underground), monitoring, or reuse of this waste, amended in 2006.

At the end of 2014, faced with the prospect of an increase in waste volumes to be treated, ANDRA, in collaboration with the Agence nationale de la recherche (ANR), launched a call for projects for innovative research on radioactive waste management. Out of twenty-nine submitted projects, twelve were selected in October 2015. They will benefit from 40 million euros over 4 years. A second call for projects was expected at the end of 2015, specifically aimed at reducing waste from the decommissioning of nuclear facilities (which, in terms of tonnage, are mainly very low-level radioactive waste (TFA)), currently sent to the Morvilliers storage center (Aube), which will not be able to accommodate all of them according to Bruno Cahen, as, according to the "latest national inventory on radioactive waste", the decommissioning of existing facilities will produce approximately two million cubic meters of TFA (three times the capacity of the Morvilliers center 650,000 metres (2,132,545.932 ft).

== Classification ==
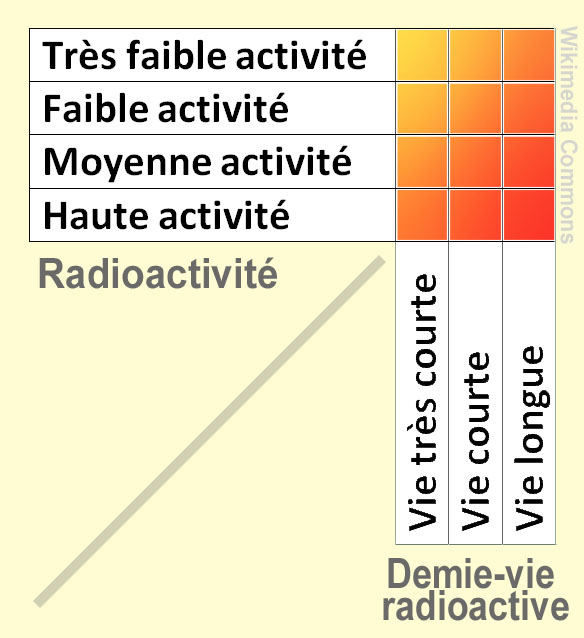
Criteria used for the classification of radioactive waste in France, and subsequently for their management

The classification is based on two parameters: the level of radioactivity and the radioactive half-life of the waste (related to the half-life of all radionuclides present in the waste).

According to French law, radioactive waste is defined as:

- very low-level activity if its activity level is between one and one hundred becquerels per gram (1 to 100 Bq/g).
- low-level activity if this level is between a few tens of becquerels per gram and a few hundred thousand becquerels per gram (100 Bq/g to 1 MBq/g);
- medium-level activity if this level is approximately one million to one billion becquerels per gram (1 MBq/g to 1 GBq/g);
- high-level activity if this level is on the order of several billion becquerels per gram (GBq/g, levels at which the specific power is on the order of watts per kilogram, hence the designation of "hot" waste);

...and, based on its radioactive half-life:

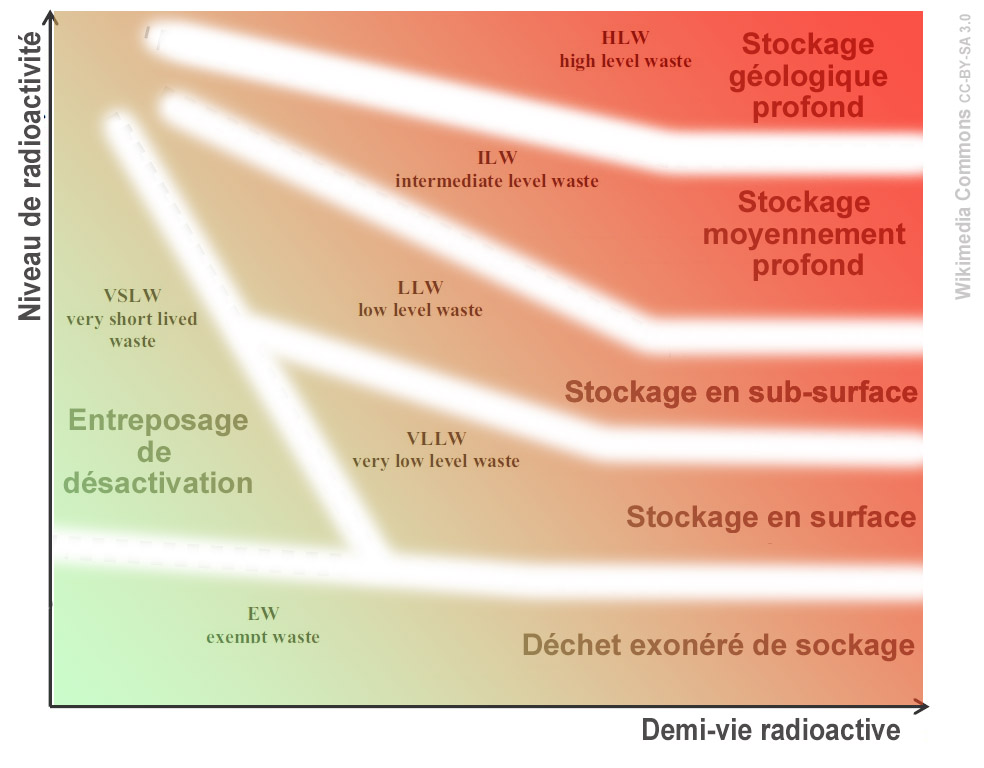
Diagram of waste classification and their management according to radioactive lifespan and radioactivity intensity

- very short-lived if its half-life is less than 100 days (which allows management by radioactive decay to treat them as conventional industrial waste after a few years);
- short-lived if its radioactivity mainly comes from radionuclides with a half-life of less than 31 years (which ensures their disappearance on a historical scale of a few centuries);
- long-lived if it contains a significant amount of radionuclides with a half-life exceeding 31 years (which requires confinement and dilution management compatible with geological time scales).

The waste manager must also consider its physical characteristics (gas, liquid, solid, powdery or not, etc.) and its potential chemical toxicity, as well as its age and reactivity ·

	Very short-lived (VTC) radioactive half-life <100 days	Short-lived (VC) radioactive half-life ≤ 31 years	Long-lived (VL) radioactive half-life > 31 years
Very Low Activity (TFA) TFA < 100 Bq/g	VTC Waste Managed on-site by radioactive decay. They are then managed as conventional waste.	TFA Waste Stored on the surface at the Morvilliers TFA Storage Center.	
Low Activity (FA) 1 MBq/g > FA >100 Bq/g	VTC Waste Managed on-site by radioactive decay. They are then managed as conventional waste.	FMA-VC Waste Stored on the surface at the Aube Storage Center, which succeeded the Manche storage centre, now closed and under surveillance.	FA-VL Waste Shallow storage center (between 15 and 200 meters (660 ft)) under study. Scheduled commissioning in 2019.
Medium Activity (MA) 1 GBq/g > MA > 1 MBq/g	VTC Waste Managed on-site by radioactive decay. They are then managed as conventional waste.	FMA-VC Waste Stored on the surface at the Aube Storage Center, which succeeded the Manche storage centre, now closed and under surveillance.	MA-VL Waste Deep storage center (at 500 meters (1,600 ft)) under study. Cigéo. Possible commissioning from 2025.
High Activity (HA) HA > 1 GBq/g	VTC Waste Managed on-site by radioactive decay. They are then managed as conventional waste.	HA Waste Deep storage center (at 500 meters (1,600 ft)) under study. Cigéo. Possible commissioning from 2035.	

=== High-level and medium-level long-lived waste ===
High-level waste, in solid and stable chemical form (usually oxides), must be stabilized in a vitrified matrix. They generate heat and are therefore stored in deactivation pools or in ventilated facilities. In France, the La Hague site and the Marcoule nuclear site host this waste. A "selective separation" process is carried out at the La Hague plant. Then, the vitrification of non-reusable high-level waste (fission products, minor actinides) produces a volume of "highly radioactive waste packages" of about 125 metres (410.105 ft) per year.

==== Long-term management for High-level long-lived waste ====
The Loi Bataille (30 December 1991) until 2006, governed three research axes:

1. Transmutation and/or chemical separation: this research axis was entrusted by the legislator, via the Loi Bataille, to the CEA;
2. Deep geological storage of radioactive waste (definitive or reversible);
3. Nuclear storage on the surface or subsurface; this research axis was entrusted by the legislator, via the Loi Bataille, to the CEA, then the responsibility for studies on nuclear storage was transferred to ANDRA in 2006.

The loi de programme relative à la gestion durable des matières et déchets radioactifs of 28 June 2006 entrusts the ANDRA with studying the option of deep geological storage and, more specifically, the possibility of commissioning an industrial "reversible" storage in a geological layer for high-level and long-lived radioactive waste by around 2025 (the Cigéo project).

In July 2016, Parliament passed a law setting the framework for the burial of French radioactive waste in the Industrial Geological Storage Center (Cigéo): the authorization decree is expected around 2025, followed by a five-year pilot phase; the center would therefore begin operations around 2030.

On 8 July 2022, the Déclaration d'utilité publique (DUP) for the Cigéo project was published by decree. ANDRA must then submit its application for site creation authorization to the Nuclear Safety Authority, whose review will take between three and five years.

=== Low and medium-level waste (FMA) ===
In France, these are intended to be stored on the surface after being solidified to prevent the dispersion of radioactivity, then encased in concrete, resin, or bitumen to prevent any chemical reaction and lock the waste in its container. They are ultimately placed in metal or concrete containers, with good mechanical resistance and manageable without specific radiation protection measures.

These containers are mainly stored on the surface at two ANDRA sites, designed for this purpose:

- the Manche storage centre located in the commune of Beaumont-Hague, which received waste packages from 1969 and is filled since 1994. It is now in a monitoring phase;
- the Aube storage center located in the commune of Soulaines-Dhuys, which has been receiving French waste since 1992 for about 40 years. Its storage capacity is one million cubic meters, with drums crushed to reduce volumes. It is currently in the operational phase.

Other French nuclear sites contain waste of this category: Cadarache, Pierrelatte, etc.

=== Very low-level waste ===
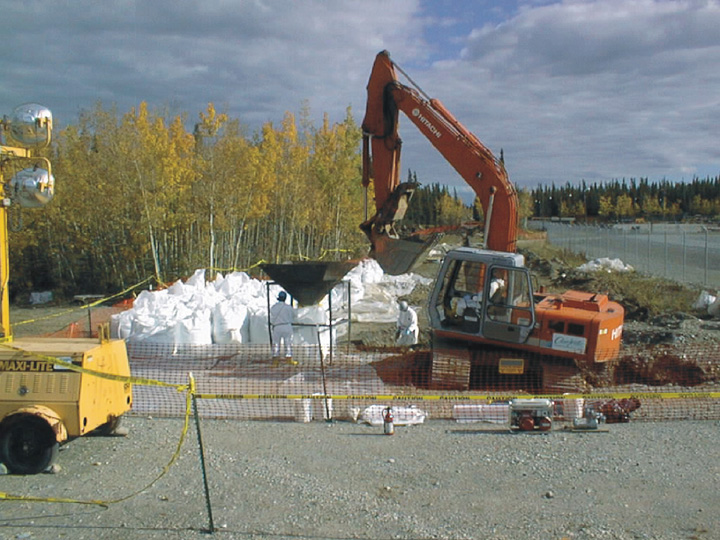
Removal of TFA waste

In the case of nuclear facilities, the concepts of very low-level waste (TFA) and waste zoning stem from the interministerial decree of 31 December 1999, setting the general technical regulations to prevent and limit nuisances and external risks resulting from the operation of basic nuclear installations.

TFA waste, mainly from nuclear decommissioning, is compacted and packaged in big bags or metal containers. They are stored in cells dug into clay, with the base designed to collect any infiltrated water during the entire storage period.

Since October 2003, some TFA waste packages are stored on the surface at the Morvilliers storage center.

=== Low-level long-lived waste ===
These include, in particular, radium-bearing waste and graphite waste, or bituminized effluents, substances containing radium, uranium, and thorium with low specific activity, as well as certain used sealed radioactive sources with long-lived low activity.

Graphite waste: These are mainly waste (not currently produced) that will come from the decommissioning of the first CEA and EDF plants (natural uranium-graphite-gas or UNGG type). These wastes are low-level radioactive but long-lived.

Radium-bearing waste: These emit radon. This requires operational constraints (notably ventilation) during their treatment.

The study of the conditioning of radium-bearing and graphite waste is ongoing by ANDRA, which proposed scenarios in 2015 (storage in intact or reworked cover sites) on this subject. It is planned to store them in subsurface (a few meters below the natural level, located in a very low permeability clay formation) or deep storage (e.g., former mine shafts).

In the meantime, they are stored on-site, particularly in the decommissioned UNGG reactors at Chinon, Marcoule, Saint-Laurent, and Bugey.

According to the Séché Environnement group, which created a subsidiary specialized in this type of waste on 10 March 2015, there would be approximately 35,000 metres (114,829.396 ft) of such waste produced annually in France in 2015 and requiring treatment.

== Production and management of radioactive waste in France ==
=== Producers and holders of radioactive waste in France ===
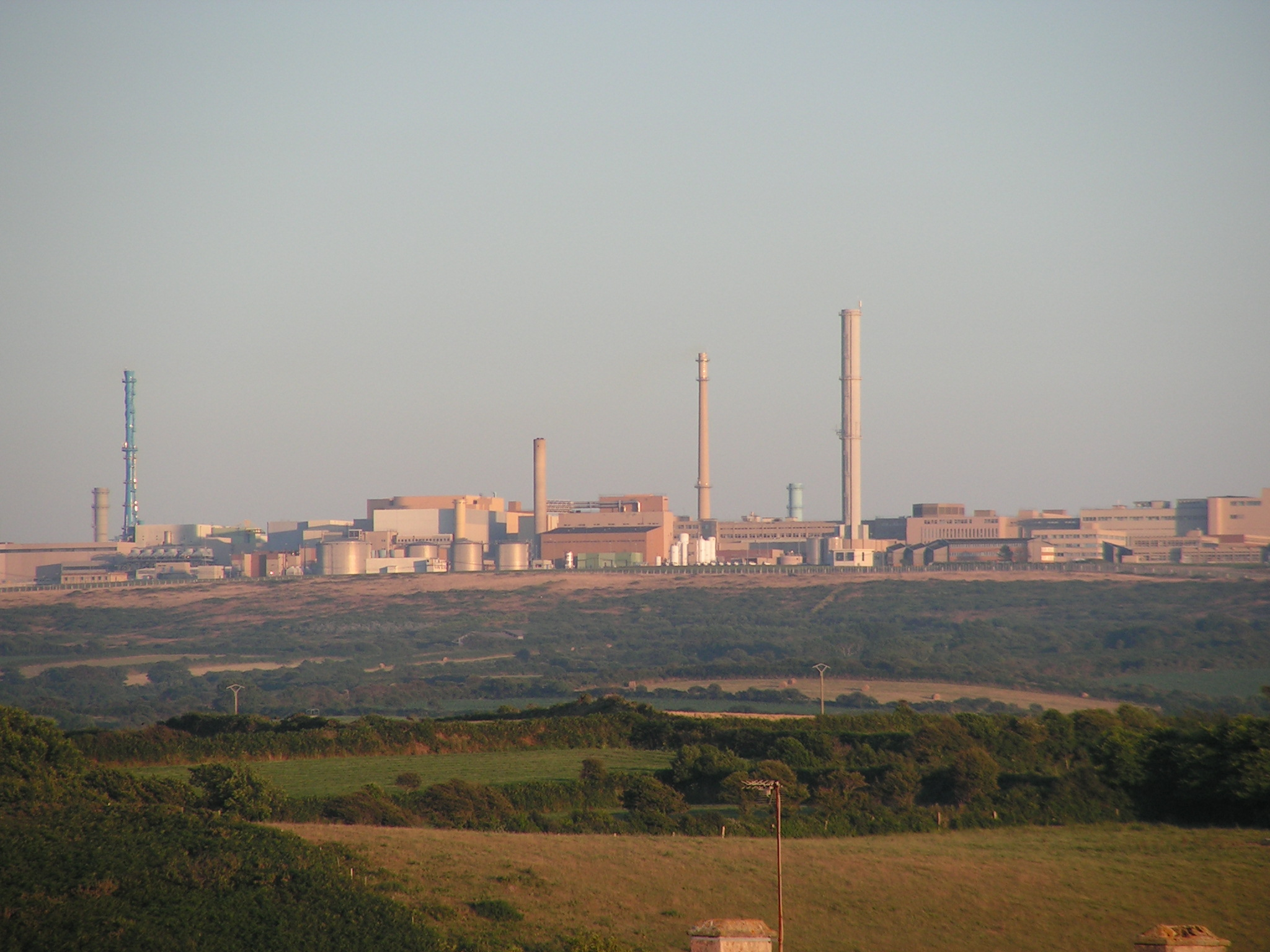
La Hague reprocessing plant

The production of radioactive waste is mainly from the electro-nuclear industry, followed by research, the military, and non-nuclear industries: medical irradiation, mining, coal plants, production and distribution of phosphate fertilizers (leaving phosphogypsum), food industry, etc. High-level long-lived waste is primarily produced by the electro-nuclear industry.

In France: more than 1,000 sites are listed as holders of radioactive waste (including all categories described above). This waste is distributed across the following sites:

- Storage facilities: ANDRA storage centers, nuclear industry or military storage sites;
- Operating nuclear facilities: research centers, nuclear power plants, fuel cycle plants;
- Decommissioned nuclear facilities;
- National Defense establishments: research, production, or testing centers for nuclear deterrence;
- Establishments using radionuclides: medical, industrial, and research sectors;
- Industrial establishments handling or having handled radioactive materials for sterilization purposes.

=== Principles of radioactive waste management in France ===
France has not yet defined a management method for all waste. The Loi Bataille of 30 December 1991 organized research until 2006, when a new law (28 June) affirmed the complementarity of storage and deep geological storage.

Under the polluter pays principle, waste management is the responsibility of the producer. Under circular DGS/SD 7 D/DHOS/E 42001-323 of 9 July 2001, radioactive waste is subject to a removal request to the IRSN. To enable their handling, producers' requests are accompanied by a detailed description of the waste characteristics and its packaging.

The Andra designs and operates storage systems suited to each category of radioactive waste. This involves collection, conditioning, storage, and monitoring of the waste. Since the law of 28 June 2006, Andra is also responsible for long-term storage. The management of waste and radioactive materials is subject to a national plan revised every three years: the National Plan for the Management of Radioactive Materials and Waste (PNGMDR).

Law No. 2016-1015 of 25 July 2016 "specifying the modalities for creating a reversible deep geological storage facility for high-level and medium-level long-lived radioactive waste" stipulates that the authorization for operating this storage can only be granted by the Nuclear Safety Authority if the reversibility of the storage is ensured for a period that cannot be less than one hundred years.

=== Economic aspects of radioactive waste management in France ===
In France, ANDRA manages TFA and FMA-VC waste in surface storage centers. The costs of construction, operation, and closure of these centers are evaluated by ANDRA, then allocated to the quantity of waste stored. These costs are periodically reassessed and analyzed by the Court of Auditors. For very low-level waste stored at the Morvilliers storage center, the cost was 270 euros per tonne in 2005. According to the Court of Auditors, this rate could increase for more complex waste. Low and medium-level short-lived waste is managed at the Manche centers until 1994 and Aube since. Storage costs in 2002 were 2,529 euros per cubic meter; fixed costs represent about 80% of the total cost.

The waste producer pays ANDRA upon delivery of the package, but under the polluter pays principle, ANDRA does not become the owner of the waste. At the end of the multi-year contract, the reassessment of storage costs leads to a revision of the cost per package and, if necessary, additional payments for packages already transferred.

The financing of long-lived waste management is achieved through the creation of provisions dedicated within the accounts of waste producers and the allocation, exclusively, of the assets necessary to cover these provisions. This financing method respects the polluter pays principle but relied on waste producers to guarantee financing. Until 2006, the verification of the adequacy between the amount and nature of provisions and the storage cost was carried out by the Court of Auditors, whose 2005 report highlighted significant shortcomings.

The law of 28 June 2006 on the sustainable management of radioactive materials and waste specifies the methods for evaluating storage costs, the amount of provisions to be made by waste producers, and the control mechanisms. The reassessment of provisions is carried out every three years, with an annual update if necessary. The storage cost is evaluated by ANDRA, which provides an estimate to the Minister. The conversion of this cost into provisions to be recorded in the producers' balance sheets is carried out by their auditors. A National Commission for the Evaluation of Financing the Costs of Decommissioning Basic Nuclear Facilities and Managing Spent Fuel and Radioactive Waste was established by the law of 28 June 2006 with the responsibility of ensuring the control of producers' provisions. The establishment of the panel of assets allocated to cover the costs of decommissioning and radioactive waste management was to be completed within five years of the law's promulgation.

As of 31 December 2017, the provisioned amounts for long-term nuclear obligations, mainly for the decommissioning of nuclear power plants, final cores, and the long-term management of radioactive waste (including the Cigéo storage project), amounted to 25.9 billion euros, with dedicated assets valued at 28.1 billion euros, representing a coverage rate of 108.5%.

The Ministry of Energy had to arbitrate between operators and the ANDRA, whose cost projections for the Cigéo deep storage project differed in 2015 by a factor of one to two; by adopting the upper range, this could lead to an increase in EDF's provisions of about two to three billion euros. Ultimately, a decree published in the Journal officiel on 30 December 2017 modified the calculation of the discount rate used to determine the amount of provisions for nuclear facility decommissioning and radioactive waste storage: this rate will be gradually adjusted to the four-year average (previously ten years) of the yield on 30-year Treasury bonds, increased by 100 basis points. The impact of this measure could reach several billion euros if interest rates remain low.

On 4 July 2019, the Court of Auditors published a report on "the back end of the nuclear fuel cycle", commending the public debate organized for the first time for the adoption of the National Plan for the Management of Radioactive Materials and Waste (PNGMDR). It considers that "to fully and objectively inform public policy decisions, a comparison of economic and environmental alternatives is necessary, but data and studies are lacking on this subject." It therefore requests France to thoroughly study all options and scenarios and better anticipate its storage capacities based on the expected quantities of materials (58 reactors aging will need to be decommissioned or renovated with "significant investments") from 2020 to 2030; the same applies to (temporary or permanent) storage sites for materials and waste. Some already old waste will need to be reconditioned. "The decisions made today in the nuclear field have consequences for many generations to come". Reprocessed uranium (URT) and used MOX fuel are considered materials intended for recycling, but current recycling forecasts are subject to significant uncertainties, which could justify their partial reclassification as waste and the creation of provisions (already made by EDF for MOX). Back-end nuclear cycle operations represent about 10% of the cost of nuclear electricity production, and the reprocessing facilities for spent fuel at La Hague will soon need to be renewed. Future expenses, estimated at 69 billion euros at the end of 2017; operators (EDF, Orano, and the CEA) are required to establish accounting provisions to cover their future costs; these provisions amount to approximately 15 billion euros; the Court considers that "public authority controls need to be deepened". The Court requests the Ministry of Ecological Transition to strengthen its capacities to analyze technical, economic, financial, and environmental issues related to radioactive waste.

=== National Plan for the Management of Radioactive Materials and Waste ===
The National Plan for the Management of Radioactive Materials and Waste (PNGMDR) is subject to periodic revision; for the development of its 5th version, a public debate was organized in 2019 by the National Commission for Public Debate.

The main topic of debate is the recycling of very low-level radioactive materials. A storage site at Morvilliers (Aube) receives this waste, but it could be saturated between 2025 and 2028. The preparatory dossier for the debate drafted by the State suggests that "one way to optimize the storage capacities for very low-level radioactive waste would be to recover some of it". The nuclear industry particularly wishes to recycle metals from the decommissioning of EDF's steam generators and the 140,000 tonnes (140,000 long tons; 150,000 short tons) of metals from Orano's (formerly Areva) former uranium enrichment plant Georges Besse 1 at Tricastin (Drôme), shut down in 2012. In total, producers estimate over the period 2015–2070 at more than 900,000 tonnes (890,000 long tons; 990,000 short tons) the mass of potentially recoverable TFA [very low-level activity] metallic waste. In 2016, EDF acquired a Swedish company, Studsvik, which uses a fusion treatment process to concentrate radioactivity in residues and recondition metals into ingots subsequently reused in various industries.

== Inventory of radioactive materials and waste volume ==
In France, the scenario favored by EDF in 2006 is the reprocessing of all recoverable materials, in the short term as MOX fuel and URT (reprocessed uranium), and in the longer term in advanced nuclear reactors under research and development.

The 2018 edition of the National Inventory of Radioactive Materials and Waste published by ANDRA provides 2016 data:

Volume of radioactive waste as of the end of 2016 in m^{3} already stored or intended to be managed by ANDRA
Type of waste	Total volume	At producers' or holders' sites	Stored at ANDRA centers	Existing storage capacity
HA-VL	3,650	3,650
MA-VL	45,000	45,000
FA-VL	90,500	90,500
FMA-VC	917,000	74,100	843,000	1,530,000
TFA	482,000	154,000	328,000	650,000
Without category	1,800	1,800
Total	1,540,000	369,050	1,171,000	2,180,000

To this inventory are added the uranium conversion treatment residues (RTCU) produced by the Comurhex Malvési plant:

Category	Volume (m^{3}) as of the end of 2016
RTCU	726,400

According to ANDRA's prospective scenarios, the total volume of radioactive waste produced and to be produced by facilities authorized as of the end of 2016 could reach between 4,372,000 and 5,048,000 metres (14,343,832.021 and 16,561,679.790 ft) by the end of the decommissioning of these facilities.

These estimates do not account for the tailings and residues from the treatment of French uranium mines, mainly located around the Massif Central, particularly in Limousin.

ANDRA also evaluates the total stock of radioactive materials present on French territory, currently in use or for which future use is planned or foreseen:

Volume of recoverable radioactive materials as of the end of 2016 (in tonnes of heavy metal)
Type of material	Volume
Natural uranium extracted from the mine	29,900 tonnes (29,400 long tons; 33,000 short tons)
Enriched natural uranium	3,860 tonnes (3,800 long tons; 4,250 short tons)
Depleted uranium from enrichment plants	310,000 tonnes (310,000 long tons; 340,000 short tons)
Uranium from reprocessing	29,600 tonnes (29,100 long tons; 32,600 short tons)
Fuel before use in power plants	448 tonnes (441 long tons; 494 short tons)
Fuel in use in EDF power plants (all types), in tonnes of heavy metal	4,500 tonnes (4,400 long tons; 5,000 short tons)
EDF oxide used fuels awaiting treatment, in tonnes of heavy metal	12,000 tonnes (12,000 long tons; 13,000 short tons)
Mixed Uranium - Plutonium (MOX)	2,695 tonnes (2,652 long tons; 2,971 short tons)
Non-irradiated plutonium, from nuclear or research sources (French share)	54 tonnes (53 long tons; 60 short tons)
Fuels from research reactors	60 tonnes (59 long tons; 66 short tons)
Defense fuels	177 tonnes (174 long tons; 195 short tons)
Thorium	8,570 tonnes (8,430 long tons; 9,450 short tons)
Suspended materials	5 tonnes (4.9 long tons; 5.5 short tons)
Other materials	70 tonnes (69 long tons; 77 short tons)

According to the French nuclear industry, French radioactive waste production is approximately 2 kilograms (4.4 lb) per year per inhabitant. According to former Environment Minister Corinne Lepage, "EDF reprocesses 850 tonnes of fuel, and not the entirety of the 1,200 tonnes produced annually by its plants".

Article 7 of the draft decree of the 3rd gestion plan (PNGMDR) acknowledges "the existence of historical waste storage sites that may not have been reported in declarations to ANDRA for the Inventory of Radioactive Materials and Waste, prescribing a study to be submitted by nuclear operators to present an assessment of their investigations and their waste management strategies". The identification of sites where mining tailings have been reused must continue, and AREVA was asked in 2013 to study their impact. The concept of recoverable by-products is relative and may evolve. If the MOX sector disappears or if electricity production by nuclear fission were replaced by fusion or available renewable energies, some waste currently recyclable by the sector (e.g., plutonium incorporated into MOX) would change status: in 2013, the concerned industries will likely need to "submit a review of studies on recovery processes and studies on possible management channels if these materials were to be classified as waste in the future".

=== Military waste ===
The ANDRA estimates nuclear waste from the atomic bomb at 9% of the total stock. This represents 148,630 cubic metres (5,249,000 cu ft), out of the 1,670,000 cubic metres (59,000,000 cu ft) of French nuclear waste recorded in 2021. This waste results from the French nuclear deterrence policy, which relies on the development, manufacture, testing, deployment, and decommissioning of nuclear weapons, naval nuclear propulsion vessels, and related facilities. Their increase will continue with the planned modernization and renewal of atomic bombs, as well as submarines and next-generation aircraft carriers with nuclear propulsion.

ANDRA does not account for waste resulting from French nuclear tests in Algeria and partly deliberately buried in the Algerian Sahara between 1960 and 1967. Likewise, it provides no indication of the volume of waste created by underground tests in the Moruroa and Fangataufa atolls. Furthermore, France disposed of nearly 15,000 tonnes (15,000 long tons; 17,000 short tons) of waste in the North-East Atlantic in the 1960s.

== Radioactive waste management sites in France ==
- La Hague (Manche)
  - Manche storage centre (ANDRA): radioactive waste storage center, closed in 1994
  - La Hague reprocessing plant (Orano)
- Marcoule (Gard)
  - Marcoule plutonium extraction plant (UP1), under decommissioning since 2012
  - Centraco (SOCODEI), conditioning plant for very low, low, and medium-level activity waste
  - Atalante, CEA laboratory dedicated to the reprocessing of irradiated nuclear fuels and the management of high-level and long-lived radioactive waste.
- Soulaines (Aube)
  - Aube storage center (ANDRA): Storage center for low and medium-level short-lived waste
- Morvilliers (Aube)
  - Morvilliers storage center (ANDRA): Storage center for very low-level waste
- Malvési (Aude)
  - Entreposage confiné de résidus issus de la conversion (ECRIN): Storage center for uranium conversion treatment residues.

In France, other sites host radioactive waste awaiting or undergoing treatment, particularly at the sites where this waste was produced, but these are not permanent storage sites (see the inventory of the ANDRA).

The Meuse/Haute-Marne underground research laboratory dedicated to characterizing clay as a host rock for deep geological storage of radioactive waste contains no radioactive materials.

== Controversy over the export of depleted uranium ==
In 1984, Greenpeace claimed that AREVA and EDF were exporting depleted uranium waste to Russia. From there, a debate emerged between environmentalists and the nuclear industry regarding the exact nature of these products (waste or energy material). Greenpeace argued that the transport of radioactive waste to Russia violates Russian environmental protection law (1989) and the 2006 European directive on the supervision and control of radioactive waste and spent nuclear fuel transfers. EDF maintained that it is recyclable depleted uranium, a claim contested by Greenpeace and The Greens, who refer to ultimate waste. "'We do not have the technology to re-enrich and chemically reprocess reprocessed uranium' currently in France, an Areva spokesperson pointed out, necessitating the sending of this depleted uranium to Russia." According to a documentary by Éric Guéret and Libération journalist Laure Noualhat, titled "Déchets, le cauchemar du nucléaire", reprocessed uranium is indeed re-enriched in Russia, "which produces 10% of materials reusable by EDF, and 90% of highly depleted uranium - known as uranium tails - which become the property of the Russian company Tenex. This uranium is stored in large open-air parking lots". EDF claims that this depleted uranium will be usable when fourth-generation reactors are developed, around 2040.

The broadcast of this documentary prompted a question from Green deputy Yves Cochet to the government, and in response, the High Committee for Transparency and Information on Nuclear Safety (HCTISN) was seized by the Minister Jean-Louis Borloo and the Parliamentary Office for the Evaluation of Scientific and Technological Choices, which questioned the main industrial stakeholders about the conduct of these exports.

In July 2010, AREVA halted exports to Russia.

In July 2010, the HCTISN concluded that "In terms of public information, [...] the information on this subject was not secret, including regarding the sending of reprocessed uranium to Russia to produce enriched uranium" but that "the significance of these movements and the precise quantities of the various materials involved were not accessible before this High Committee report". It recommended greater transparency on the subject

=== Risks ===
The depleted uranium stored in the open air in Russia, in the Siberia plains, "in its current state is not particularly dangerous... except if an aircraft were to crash into it", as this "would disperse radioactive materials into the environment", notes Libération. However, Stéphane Lhomme, then spokesperson for the Sortir du nucléaire Network, denounced these practices by Areva and EDF: "the French nuclear waste abandoned in Russia is stored in the open air, at the mercy of an accident or an attack. It is worth knowing that this situation is unfortunately not exceptional: in Niger, where Areva extracts 'French' uranium, high amounts of tailings and other extraction residues are abandoned in the open air. This is unjustifiable even if the radioactivity of these materials is moderate: the wind disperses particles over hundreds of kilometers"

Furthermore, the transport of these radioactive residues by cargo ship over 8,000 kilometres (5,000 mi) poses security issues. Greenpeace recalls that "as early as 1984, the cargo ship Mont-Louis sank off Zeebrugge (Belgium), carrying a load of French uranium from reprocessing destined for Riga (Russia)".

== See also ==
- Waste
- Hazardous waste
- Radioactivity
- Landfill
- Agence nationale pour la gestion des déchets radioactifs
- Radiation
- Civil protection
- Earthquake
- Cobalt
- Nuclear fuel cycle in France
- MYRRHA (European research project on the transmutation of minor actinides)

== Bibliography ==
- Turlay, René (1997). Les déchets nucléaires [Nuclear Waste] (in French). Société française de physique, EDP Sciences.
- Bey, Pierre; Gérard, Jean-Pierre; Schlumberger, Martin (2013). Faut-il avoir peur de la radioactivité ? [Should We Fear Radioactivity?] (in French). Odile Jacob.
- Gin, Stéphane (2006). Les déchets nucléaires : quel avenir ? [Nuclear Waste: What Future?] (in French). Paris: Dunod éditeur.
- Petit, Jean-Pierre (18 February 2014). "Les déchets nucléaires, bombe à retardement planétaire" [Nuclear Waste, a Planetary Time Bomb]. La Voix de la Russie (in French).
- Barrillot, Bruno; Davis, Mary (1994). Les déchets nucléaires militaires [Military Nuclear Waste] (in French). Lyon: Éditions du CDRPC. p. 384.
- Barrillot, Bruno (1999). Audit atomique. Le coût de l'arsenal nucléaire français 1945-2010 [Atomic Audit. The Cost of the French Nuclear Arsenal 1945-2010] (in French). Lyon: Éditions de l'Observatoire des armements / CDRPC. p. 376.
- Barrillot, Bruno (2005). Le complexe nucléaire : des liens entre l'atome civil et l'atome militaire [The Nuclear Complex: Links Between Civilian and Military Atoms] (in French). Lyon: Co-edition Observatoire des armements / Sortir du nucléaire Network. p. 144.
- Bataille, Christian (December 1990). Rapport sur la gestion des déchets nucléaires à haute activité [Report on the Management of High-Level Nuclear Waste] (in French). Office parlementaire d'évaluation des choix scientifiques et technologiques, Assemblée nationale n° 1839 - Sénat n° 184.
- Bataille, Christian (15 December 1997). L'évaluation de la recherche sur la gestion des déchets nucléaires à hautes activités – Tome II : Les déchets militaires [Evaluation of Research on the Management of High-Level Nuclear Waste – Volume II: Military Waste] (in French). Office parlementaire d'évaluation des choix scientifiques et technologiques, Assemblée nationale 541 - Sénat 179. p. 154.
- Bouveret, Patrice; Collin, Jean-Marie (September 2019). "Interdire les armes nucléaires" [Prohibiting Nuclear Weapons]. Les Notes de la FEP (in French) (12): 16.
- Davis, Mary Byrd (2001). La France nucléaire. Matières et sites [Nuclear France. Materials and Sites] (in French). WISE Paris. p. 338.
- Collin, Jean-Marie (2018). Le Traité sur l'interdiction des armes nucléaires [The Treaty on the Prohibition of Nuclear Weapons] (in French). Groupe de recherche et d'information sur la paix et la sécurité.
- Collin, Jean-Marie (April 2002). "Propulsion nucléaire navale : un inventaire complet" [Naval Nuclear Propulsion: A Complete Inventory]. Cahier n° 9, Observatoire des armes nucléaires françaises / CDRPC (in French). Lyon.
- Dossier éthique : Gestion des déchets nucléaires : réflexion et questions sur les enjeux éthiques [Ethical Dossier: Nuclear Waste Management: Reflections and Questions on Ethical Issues] (PDF) (in French). Pax Christi. October 2019. Archived from the original (PDF) on 2023-04-18.
- Rapport mondial sur les déchets nucléaires : focus sur l'Europe [World Nuclear Waste Report: Focus on Europe] (in French). Paris: Heinrich-Böll-Stiftung. November 2020.
