= Agence nationale pour la gestion des déchets radioactifs =

French agency managing radioactive waste

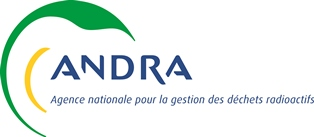
- Abbreviation: ANDRA
- Legal status: national public industrial or commercial establishment without a public accountant
- Budget: 363,402,000 euro (2019)
- Employees: 674 (2020)

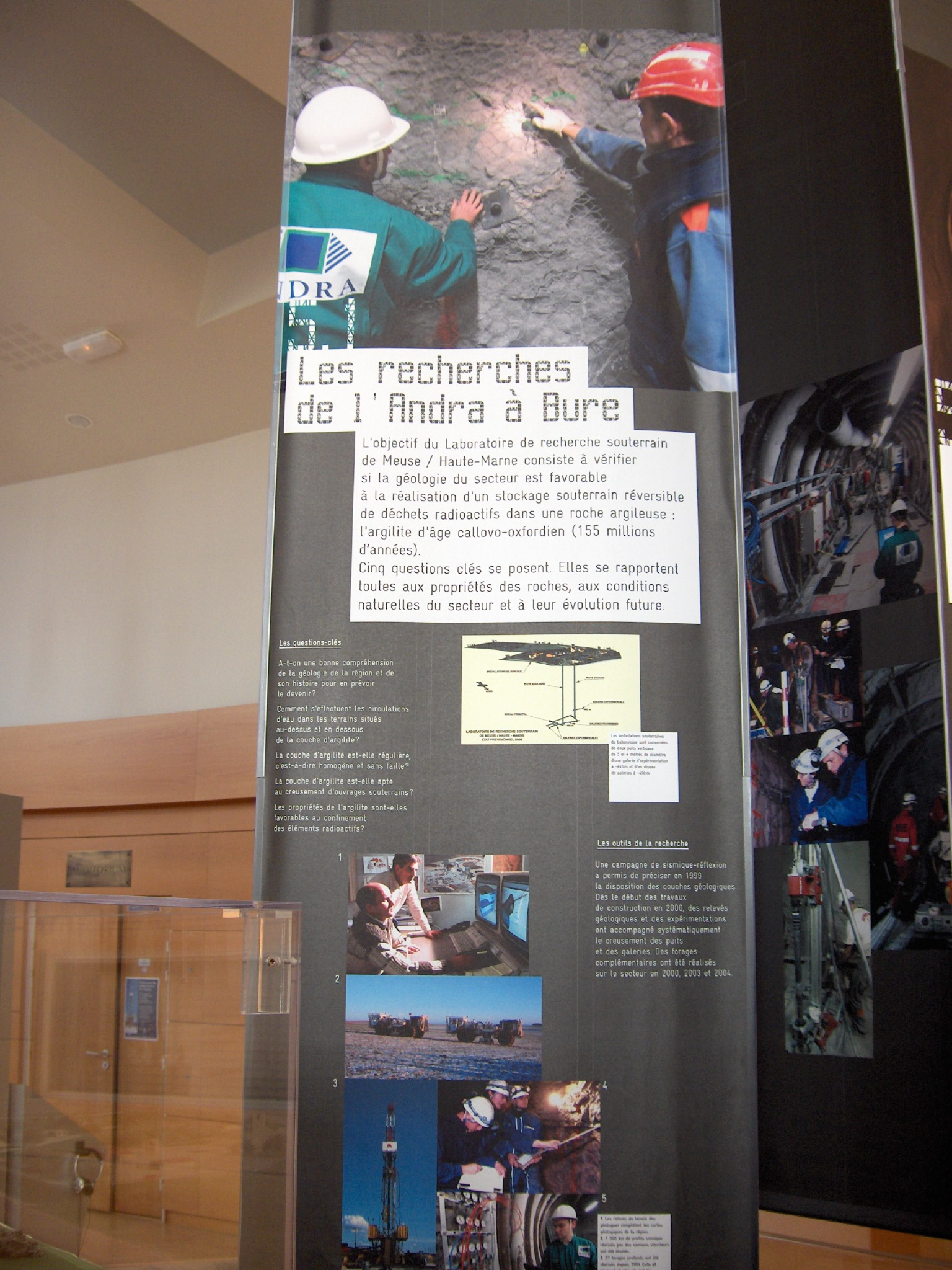
Presentation of ANDRA research at Meuse/Haute Marne Underground Research Laboratory, in Bure

The Agence nationale pour la gestion des déchets radioactifs (French pronunciation: [aʒɑ̃s nɑsjɔnal puʁ la ʒɛstjɔ̃ de deʃɛ ʁadjoaktif]; ANDRA), or National agency for the management of radioactive waste, is a 'public institution of an industrial and commercial nature' charged with the management of radioactive waste in France.

Placed under the supervision of the ministers for research, the industry and the environment, ANDRA leads complementary industrial, research and public information missions.

ANDRA's funding comes from a mixture of public and private sources, including a tax on producers of radioactive waste and commercial contracts with waste producers.

ANDRA is responsible for the Cigéo deep geological repository project.

== Locations ==
ANDRA is currently based at five locations:

- The head office, at Châtenay-Malabry (92);
- Manche storage centre, at La Hague site (50), which accepted wastes from 1969 to 1994 and is now in care and surveillance;
- Aube storage centre, in Soulaines-Dhuys (10), which accepts low-level waste and short-lived intermediate-level waste;
- Morvilliers storage centre (10), which accepts very-low-level waste;
- Meuse/Haute Marne Underground Research Laboratory, at Bure (55), whose purpose is feasibility studies for the Cigéo deep geological repository for the disposal of high-level and long-lived intermediate-level waste.

Andra publishes a national inventory of radioactive materials and wastes every three years, then every five years following the public debate of 2019. The first three inventories were criticised for not containing information on military nuclear sites. The 1996 edition touches on 29 sites relevant to the ministry of defence and contains military nuclear wastes, and the 1997 edition touches on 45 sites.

== Partnerships ==
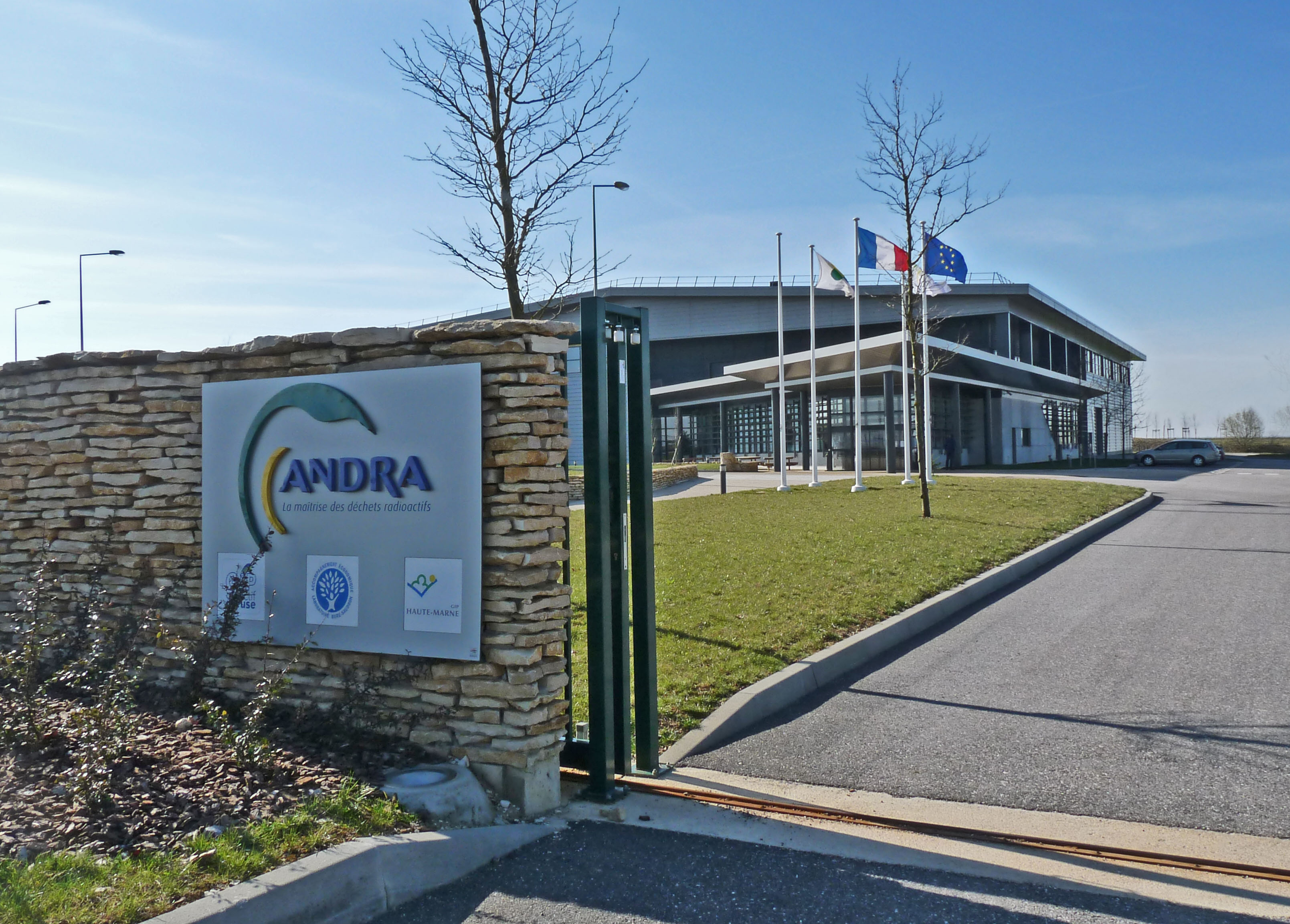
Espace technologique de Saudron

ANDRA develops public-public and public-private partnerships with other organisations. For example:

- 4 September 2009, a partnership agreement was signed with the Institut national de recherche en informatique et en automatique (INRIA) for numerical simulation, to better model the evolution of a radioactive waste disposal facility over millions of years.
- 29 April 2010, the Institut national de la recherche agronomique (Inra) signed a partnership agreement with Andra for the study of dynamic evolution of terrestrial and aquatic ecosystems, and to evaluate and model the impact on biodiversity of global changes and human impacts, with the Observatoire pérenne de l'environnement (OPE) (Permanent Observatory of the Environment) of Andra, which, since 2007, observes several thousand hectares in Meuse and Haute-Marne, for at least a century
- 3 August 2010, a new agreement was signed by the State and Andra, in the context of the "Programme of future investments" (financed by borrowing) and of the "National plan for management of radioactive materials and wastes" 2010–2012. On this occasion, 100 million Euros were promised to Andra to finance two projects aimed at reducing the volume and hazard of certain problematic radioactive wastes; the aims were:
  - to improve recycling of very low level radioactive (ferrous) metals within the nuclear sector, which originate in dismantling of nuclear installations; possible use cases include steel or cast iron containers for radioactive wastes destined for disposal at Andra centres, or integration into the construction of the disposal facility (e.g. as doors) at the Aube VLLW repository. According to Andra, this would save 130000 m^{3} of space in its disposal facilities.
  - improve the treatment and conditioning of certain wastes which are the most problematic for disposal (e.g. gases, liquids, organic matter). The aim is to better treat, inert and dispose of wastes without a current defined dispoal route (produced by minor producers), and to obtain the physical-chemical forms which are as inert as possible with respect to the requirements for disposal. The volumes of these wastes are relatively limited at present, but expected to increase in the years to come.

== History ==
Andra was created in November 1979 within the CEA.

In 1983, ANDRA selected twenty-eight sites whose geology would be favourable to the establishment of an underground storage facility for long-lived HLW. Lively local opposition forced ANDRA to abandon research on these sites.

The law of 30 December 1991 relating to research on radioactive waste management (known as the Bataille Law after its sponsor, Christian Bataille), gave Andra its independence from the CEA and gave it its statue as an établissement public à caractère industriel et commercial. Andra is notably charged with designing and realising new storage centres taking account of long-term perspectives on production and management of wastes, and to carry out all necessary studies to this end, such as the realisation and operation of underground laboratories for the study of deep geological formations. Andra installed its headquarters at Châtenay-Malabry.

In 2003, ANDRA decided to record certain of its archives on permanent paper in resistant ink, with the aim of guaranteeing preservation of the information for a minimum of 300 years, for the purpose of compliance with decree No. 2003-30 of 10 January 2003, which obliges the Manche storage centre to permanently record information relating to its stored wastes after the site is closed.

In the context of dismantling of French nuclear facilities, ANDRA launched an invitation to tender in September 2015 for the development of innovative technological solutions aiming at minimising the impact of nuclear wastes. According to estimates, dismantling of nuclear facilities will produce 2.1 million cubic metres of Very Low Level Waste (VLLW), which is more than three times the capacity of the Aube storage centre.

On 5 August 2015, the Constitutional Council censured the insertion into the law for growth, activity and equal economic opportunities, known as the Macron law, of an article defining reversibility adopted in the Senate on 18 April on the proposal of Gérard Longuet, on the grounds that it does not have a link, even indirect, with the provisions contained in the bill. The condition of reversibility is nevertheless included in the law defining the scope of the Cigéo project adopted in July 2016.

In the 2017 finance bill, ANDRA's budget is charged to the budgetary programme of the Ministry of Ecology, under item 174 (Energy, Climate and post-mining).

=== Bure laboratory ===
In 1999, ANDRA was charged by the State with creating an underground laboratory in the commune of Bure, Meuse for the study of radioactive waste storage, and to operate it until 2006. The project consists of testing deep geological storage (at a depth of 500 m in a layer of clay), of the most dangerous wastes. The aim of deep geological storage is to contain the wastes until they become non-hazardous, over a period of 100000 years. ANDRA has been progressively buying land for the site, and has created a public information centre at Saudron, to inform the public on the principles of geological disposal. As of August 2015, 1650 m of tunnels had been constructed.

The construction of this laboratory has provoked a strong opposition among some local residents. In exchange for the use of the underground, ANDRA consecrates a budget of 5 million French Francs per year to support local communities (10 million in 1997), and promises 60 million Francs if the laboratory is constructed. Opponents of the project foresee a potential for corruption of the local political authorities as a result of these funding offers.

=== Cigéo ===
In December 2002, the Société générale pour les techniques nouvelles (then a subsidiary of AREVA) and COGEMA signed a framework contract with ANDRA for engineering studies relating to the project.

ANDRA proposes the following provisional timeline, assuming that the necessary authorisations are obtained:

- 2015: submission to the State of a proposal for a master plan for the operation of Cigeo, and to the ASN a safety options file and a portfolio of options for recoverability techniques, in order to prepare for the examination of the application for authorisation to create Cigeo;
- 2019: submission of the application for a declaration of public utility by ANDRA;
- 2030: Start of surface construction;
- 2035: Start of operations with a pilot industrial phase.

After more than thirty years of research, including at the Meuse/Haute Marne Underground Research Laboratory, Andra applied in 2023 to ASN, the French nuclear safety authority, for permission to construct the facility.

== Governance ==
=== Direction ===
- Pierre-Marie Abadie, director general since 2014. succeeded Marie-Claude Dupuis, director from 2005 to 2014.
- Frédéric Launeau, director of the Cigéo project since 2015

=== Administrative council ===
The council is composed of 23 members: two representatives of the French Parliament; six representatives of the State; seven qualified persons; eight representatives of the employees of the agency. Since the 9 May 2019, it is presided over by Adolphe Colrat, préfet hors classe.

=== Scientific council ===
The Scientific council was created by the law of 30 December 1991. It is composed of twelve additional members, nominated for five years. The members are French and foreign experts, men and women, chosen by the ministers on proposition by Andra. The Scientific council issues opinions on the strategy, research programmes and results presented by the agency.

== Communication ==
The agency declares having an annual communications budget of a little over 1 million Euros at its disposal.

=== Lobbying activity in France ===
For 2020, the agency declared to the Haute Autorité pour la transparence de la vie publique that it engaged in lobbying activities in France pour with a value not exceeding 200 000 Euros.

=== Promotion of agency activities ===
ANDRA edits and distributes a free journal (200000 copies) as well as pedagogical materials aimed at teachers.

The agency finances video-bloggers (Simon Puech, Anonimal, David Sheik), the Play Bac enterprise (2010 et 2017) and Usbek & Rica in order to promote the Cigéo project.

== International homologues ==
- Germany
  - DBE: Deutsche Gesellschaft zum Bau und Betrieb von Endlagern für Abfallstoffe mbH
  - BfS: Bundesamt für Strahlenschutz
- Belgium
  - ONDRAF: Organisme national des déchets radioactifs et des matières fissiles enrichies.
  - SCK-CEN: Centre d'étude de l'énergie nucléaire
- Canada
  - NWMO: Nuclear Waste Management Organization
- China
  - China National Nuclear Corporation
- Korea
  - KEPCO: Korean Electric Power Corporation
  - KAERI: Korea Atomic Energy Research Institute
- Spain
  - ENRESA: Empresa Nacional de Residuos Radioactivos
- United States of America
  - US-DOE: US Department of Energy
  - OCRWM : Office of Civilian Radioactive Waste Management
- Finland
  - Posiva Oy: Expertise on nuclear waste management
- United Kingdom
  - BNFL : British Nuclear Fuel Limited
  - RWM : Radioactive Waste Management Ltd
- Italy
  - ENEA : Agenzia nazionale per le nuove tecnologie, l'energia e lo sviluppo economico sostenibile
- Japan
  - JNFL : Japan Nuclear Fuel Limited
  - NUMO : Nuclear Waste Management Organization of Japan
  - RWMC : Radioactive Waste Management funding and research Center
- Sweden
  - SKB : Swedish Nuclear Fuel and Waste Management Company
  - KASAM : Swedish National Council for Nuclear Waste
- Switzerland
  - Nagra/Cedra: Nationale Genossenschaft für die Lagerung radioaktiver Abfälle/société coopérative nationale pour le stockage des déchets radioactifs

== Filmography ==
- L'Histoire de l'Andra ou l'invention d'un métier, 20 min (DVD)

== See also ==
- nuclear energy
- radioactive waste
- Nuclear waste management in France

== Bibliography ==
- L'Andra en Meuse/Haute-Marne, 2009, 20 pp.
- Pierre Bonneau; Gaspard d'Allens; Cécile Guillard (2020). Cent mille ans. Bure ou le scandale enfoui des déchets nucléaires. La Revue dessinée - Seuil. ISBN 978-2-02-145982-1..
