= Manche storage centre =

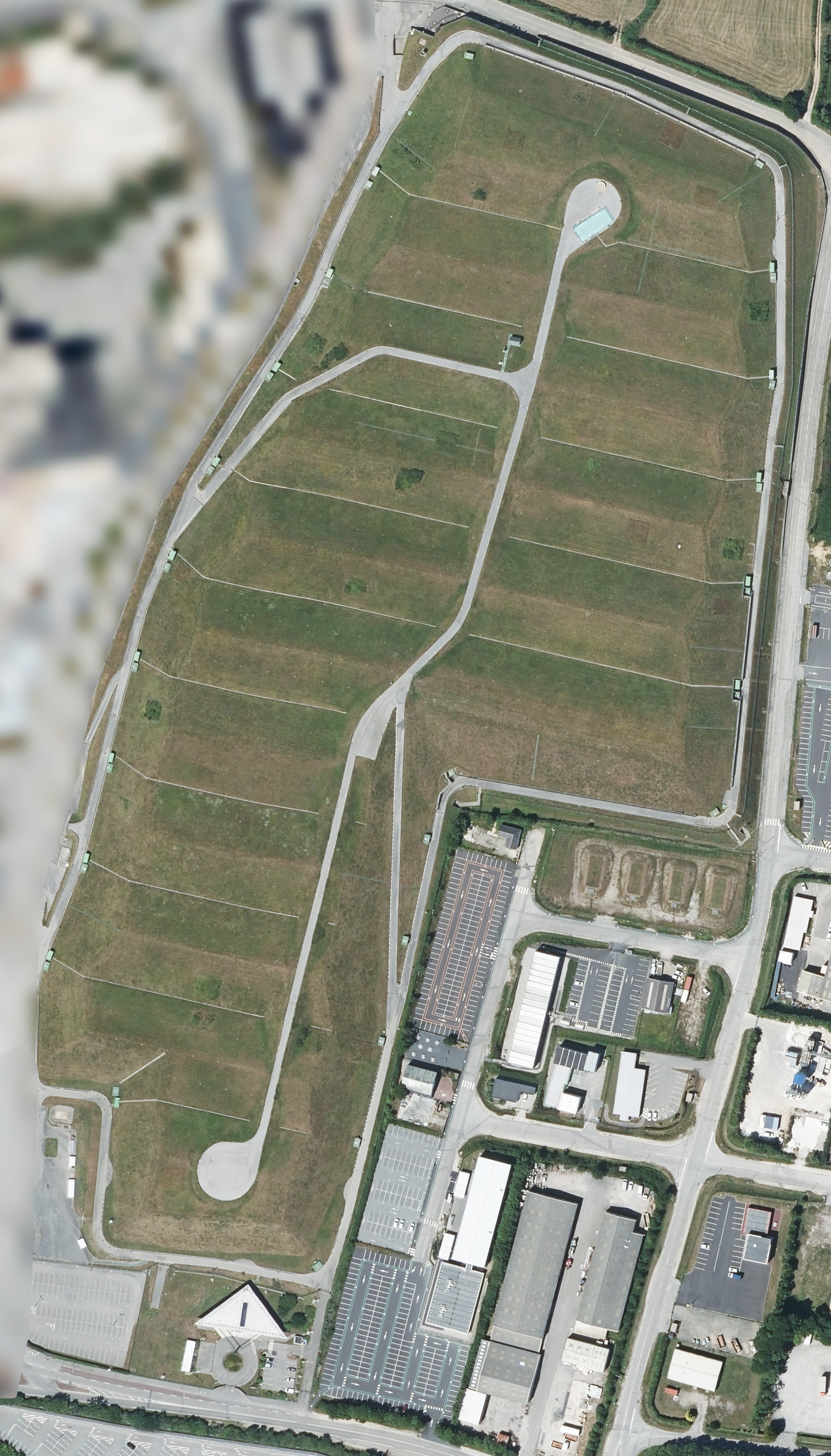
Aerial view. At the southernmost end, the reception and administration building. To the west, the Hague reprocessing plant (blurred)

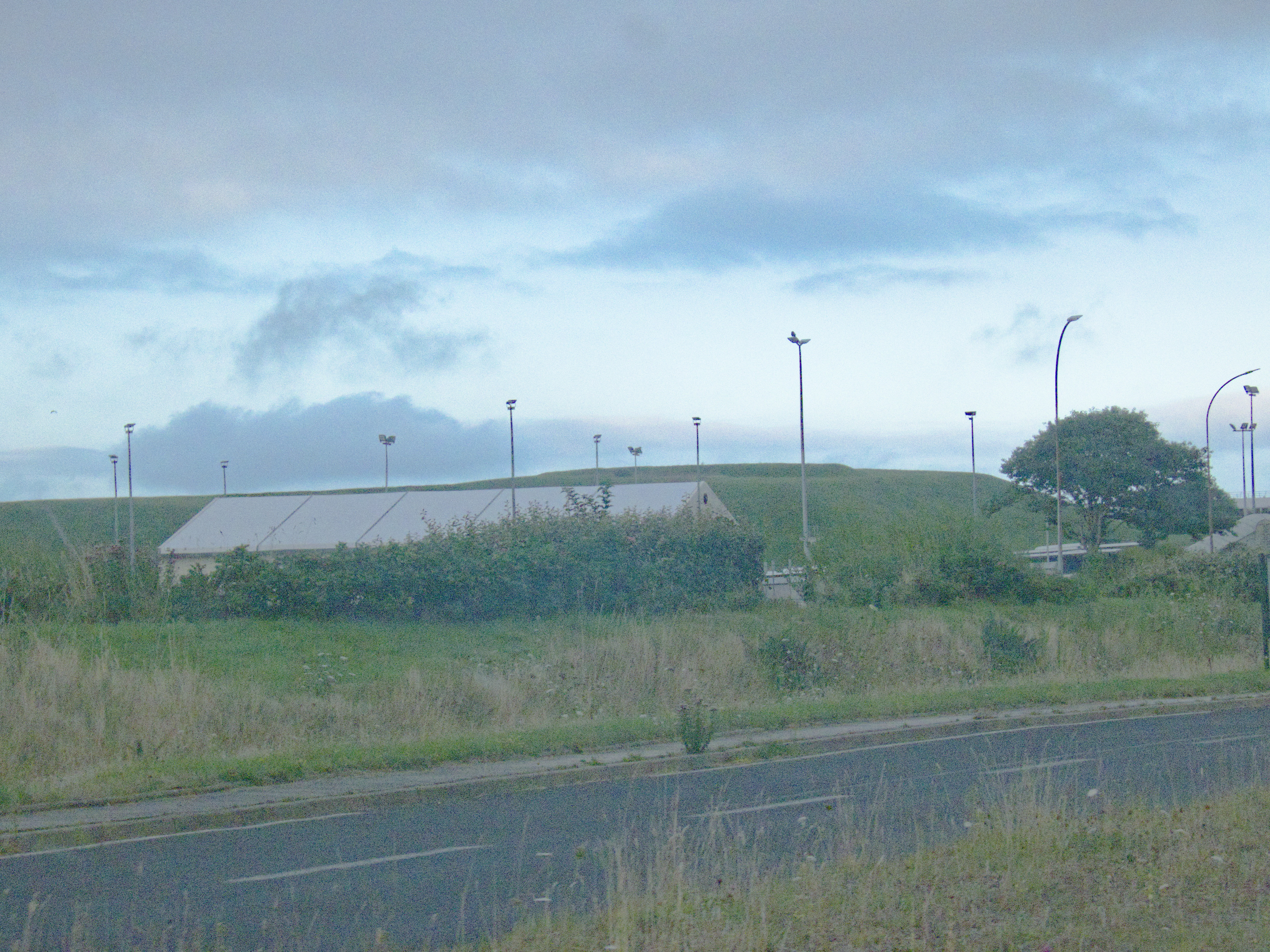
Radioactive waste casings are stored beneath a waterproof cover itself covered by grassy earth

The Centre de stockage de la Manche (CSM)(Manche storage centre) is the oldest French radioactive waste storage centre. It is located in the commune of La Hague, bordering on the La Hague site. The CSM was created in 1969 and then received nuclear waste until it reached saturation in 1994. According to Agence nationale pour la gestion des déchets radioactifs (ANDRA)'s inventory, the waste stored includes approximately 1,469,265 packages, corresponding to 527,225 m³, mainly from nuclear power generation (nuclear power plants and facilities corresponding to nuclear fuel cycle front end and back end).

Hurd's Deep, used in the 1950s and 1960s for the dumping of low- and intermediate-level radioactive wastes, is located in the vicinity.

== History ==
In 1967, the Atomic Energy Commission (CEA) created Infratome, a private company which was a subsidiary of the fr:Mines de potasse d'Alsace. After considering the Biville dunes, owned by the army, the decision was made to build the CSM to the east of the La Hague reprocessing plant, in a wetland area called the "Haut Marais". Today, a wetland would never be chosen to house a storage centre.

The local elected officials did not want the CSM to be managed by a private operator. As a consequence, the CEA controlled the storage facilities until 1991, when the Agence nationale pour la gestion des déchets radioactifs (ANDRA: National Agency for Radioactive Waste Management), which had been an entity of the CEA since 1979, took over the centre as an independent public institution (created by the law of 30 December 1991).

The first waste received in 1969 was hospital waste, in particular radium used for cancer treatment. Initially, storage consisted of burial in ordinary trenches, in the ground. Then the safer and easier storage on the surface was adopted: Concrete blocks are poured around the casks, then covered with a plastic film and earth. The result of storage on the surface is called a "tumulus".

In 1976, an accident occurred that caused tritium pollution of the aquifer and water on the surface. For several years, plutonium, radium, thorium, and waste containing tritium from all of the French nuclear power plants had been stored in 6 vaults in a structure called TB2. The leaks would be due to an overflow at the surface of the deep drainage network on the grounds of heavy rainfalls and malfunctions of the lifting pump.

In 1984, storage structures were restored (trenches in the ground and concrete-walled trenches) and packages were taken back and reconditioned, improving their containment.

In 1991, the construction of the centre's roof began. It is intended to protect the packages from water infiltration.

In 1994, the last package was received, then the storage was closed by the ANDRA in order to prepare the transition into the monitoring phase (planned for a period of around 300 years). The closure of the facility incorporates a waste encapsulation system (known as a cap) designed for watertightness, durability, and protection. The watertightness is achieved by a bituminous geomembrane.

In 2003, a decree authorized the centre to enter the transition into the monitoring phase.

== Remarks ==
In 1996, two official reports showed that the site safety studies were positive. The government's evaluation commission also considers that the site cannot be restored to its initial state even after 300 years (in French site non banalisable), and that it is necessary to keep its memory.

According to the Sortir du nucléaire (France), the site's management would be poor: "some defective canister sometimes directly in the ground should be reconditioned, but the project was stopped because of its cost and of the risk to workers; casks are protected from rain by a waterproof cover that is already beginning to crack; the embankments are sagging; rivers that flow from the site are subject to pollution".

In 2006, Sortir du nucléaire also claims that it contains more than 100 kg of disseminated plutonium, 200 tonnes of uranium, chemicals and heavy metals.

In 2013, a study carried out by fr:Association pour le contrôle de la radioactivité dans l'Ouest, based in Caen, and financed by the Manche departmental council and the Autorité de sûreté nucléaire showed that data from ANDRA were underestimated. According to this association, actinides are found in the bed of fr:Ruisseau de Sainte-Hélène
