= France Nature Environnement =

- Abbreviation: FNE
- Founded: 1968, (as Société nationale de protection de la nature)
- Type: Environmental Protection charity
- Headquarters: Paris 19e
- Region served: France
- Affiliations: European Environmental Bureau
- Website: fne.asso.fr (in French)

France Nature Environnement (FNE) is a national federation of associations for the protection of nature and the environment in France. Created in 1968 as the French Federation of Societies for the Protection of Nature (Fédération française des sociétés de protection de la nature it was recognised as having public benefits (reconnu d'utilité publique) in 1976.

As an umbrella organisation, FNE speaks on behalf of a movement of almost 90000 members in some 9000 associations in France and its overseas territories, grouped into 46 member organisations.

The logo of the Federation is the hedgehog, and its motto is Partout où la nature a besoin de nous ("Everywhere nature needs us").
