= Mandres-en-Barrois =

- Commune
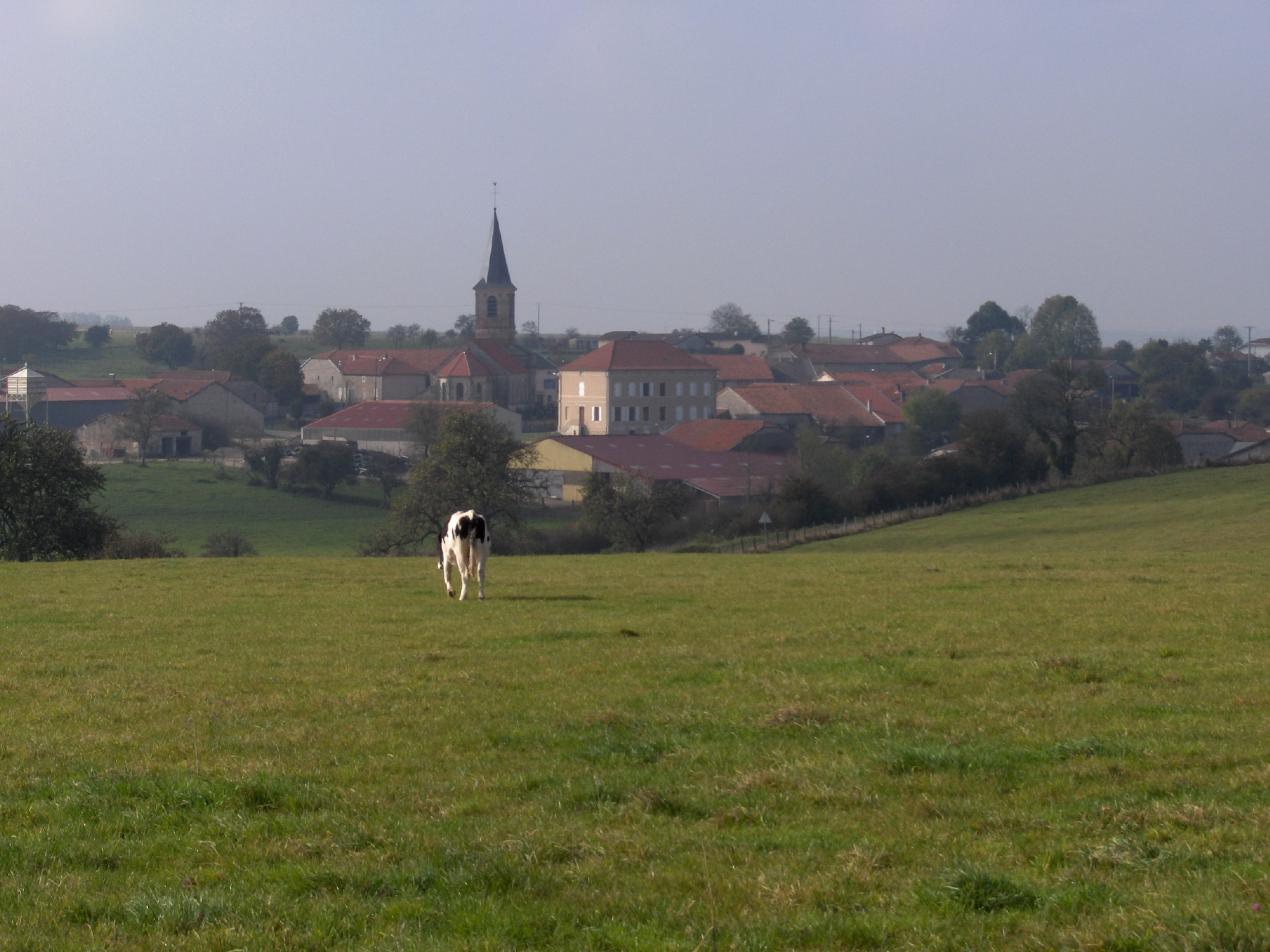
- A general view of Mandres-en-Barrois

- Coat of arms
- Location of Mandres-en-Barrois
- Location within France Location within Grand Est
- Coordinates: 48°29′33″N 5°23′27″E
- Country: France
- Region: Grand Est
- Department: Meuse
- Arrondissement: Bar-le-Duc
- Canton: Ligny-en-Barrois
- Intercommunality: CC Portes de Meuse

Government
  - Mayor (2020–2026): Julien Robert
- Area^{1}: 17.71 km^{2} (6.84 sq mi)
- Elevation: 367 m (1,204 ft)
- Highest elevation: 400 m (1,300 ft)
- Lowest elevation: 318 m (1,043 ft)
- Population (2023): 110
  - Density: 6.2/km^{2} (16/sq mi)
- Time zone: UTC+01:00 (CET)
  - Summer (DST): UTC+02:00 (CEST)
- INSEE/Postal code: 55315 /55290
- ^{1} French Land Register data, which excludes lakes, ponds, glaciers > 1 km^{2} (0.386 sq mi or 247 acres) and river estuaries.

Mandres-en-Barrois (French pronunciation: [mɑ̃dʁ ɑ̃ baʁwa], lit. 'Mandres in Barrois') is a commune in the Meuse department in Grand Est in north-eastern France.

== See also ==
- Communes of the Meuse department
