= Saudron =

- Commune
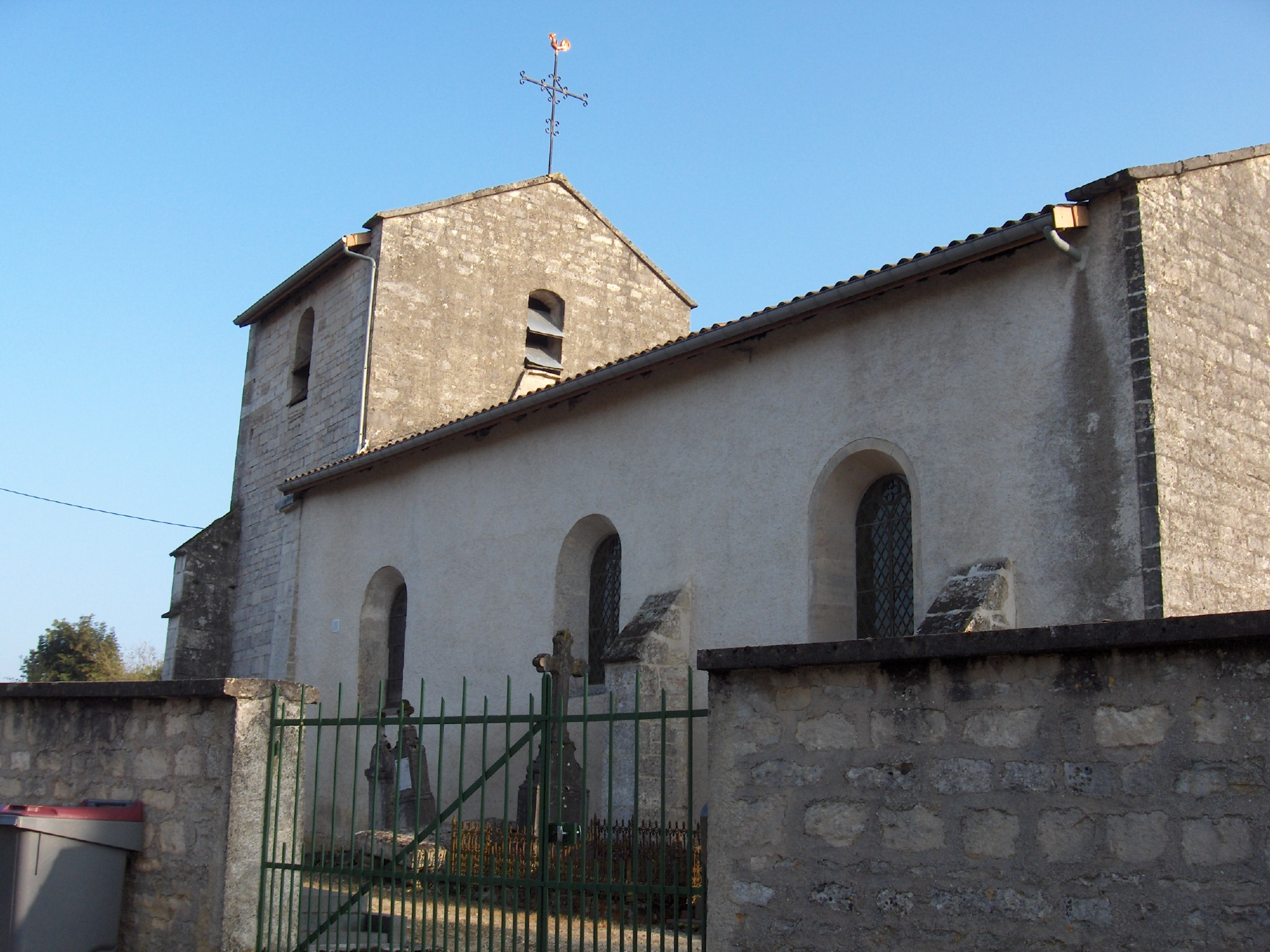
- The church in Saudron
- Location of Saudron
- Location within France Location within Grand Est
- Coordinates: 48°29′32″N 5°19′47″E
- Country: France
- Region: Grand Est
- Department: Haute-Marne
- Arrondissement: Saint-Dizier
- Canton: Poissons
- Intercommunality: Bassin de Joinville en Champagne

Government
  - Mayor (2020–2026): Jean-François Marechal
- Area^{1}: 9.06 km^{2} (3.50 sq mi)
- Elevation: 350 m (1,150 ft)
- Highest elevation: 397 m (1,302 ft)
- Lowest elevation: 316 m (1,037 ft)
- Population (2023): 40
  - Density: 4.4/km^{2} (11/sq mi)
- Time zone: UTC+01:00 (CET)
  - Summer (DST): UTC+02:00 (CEST)
- INSEE/Postal code: 52463 /52230
- ^{1} French Land Register data, which excludes lakes, ponds, glaciers > 1 km^{2} (0.386 sq mi or 247 acres) and river estuaries.

Saudron (French pronunciation: [sodʁɔ̃]) is a commune in the Haute-Marne department in north-eastern France.

== See also ==
- Communes of the Haute-Marne department
