= La Hague site =

Nuclear fuel reprocessing plant at La Hague, France

Coordinates: 49°40′42″N 1°52′46″W

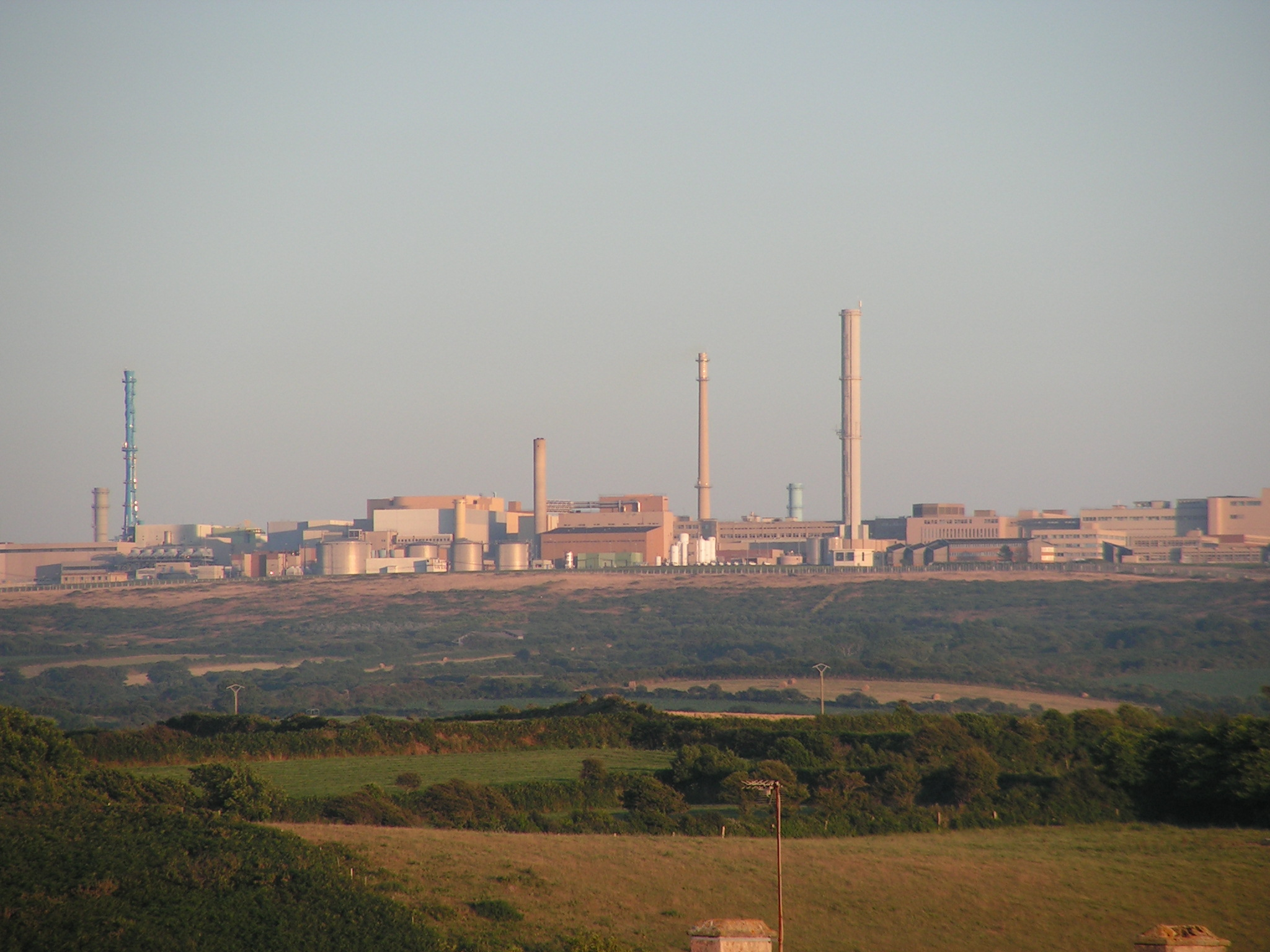
La Hague in 2005

The La Hague site is a nuclear fuel reprocessing plant at La Hague on the Cotentin Peninsula in northern France, with the Manche storage centre bordering on it. Operated by Orano, formerly AREVA, and prior to that COGEMA (Compagnie générale des matières atomiques), La Hague has nearly half of the world's light water reactor spent nuclear fuel reprocessing capacity. It has been in operation since 1976, and has a capacity of about 1,700 tonnes per year. It extracts plutonium which is then recycled into MOX fuel at the Marcoule site.

It has treated spent nuclear fuel from France, Japan, Germany, Belgium, Switzerland, Italy, Spain and the Netherlands. It processed 1100 tonnes in 2005. The non-recyclable part of the radioactive waste is eventually sent back to the user nation. Prior to 2015, more than 32,000 tonnes of spent nuclear fuel has been reprocessed, with 70% of that from France, 17% from Germany and 9% from Japan.

== Operations ==
Spent nuclear fuel roughly consists of three categories. The largest fraction by far is uranium that was present in the fuel from the start and was not affected by the nuclear reactions. Most of this uranium consists of uranium-238, which has a low radioactivity.

Around 3-4% of the material consists of fission products. These are mostly composed of highly radioactive isotopes, as the fission of uranium has endowed these with too many neutrons to be stable. As with all highly radioactive material, this level of radioactivity decreases relatively rapidly, although storage and shielding is required for at least hundreds of years.

Third, atom species are present which have a larger mass and atomic number than uranium itself. The majority of this so-called transuranic waste consists of plutonium isotopes, although other species are also present, such as americium.

Spent fuel treatment plants seek to separate these three categories into fractions that are as pure as possible. In nuclear reprocessing plants about 96% of spent nuclear fuel is recycled back into uranium-based and mixed-oxide MOX fuels.

One of the main methods for the separation of spent fuel is the PUREX process, which separates the plutonium and the uranium from the remainder of the spent fuel before the uranium and plutonium are separated from one another in a series of complex chemical operations. The uranium becomes uranyl nitrate while the plutonium is sent for conversion into plutonium oxide. The latter is used to produce fresh fuel called MOX – mixed oxides of uranium and plutonium, which can be used as fuel in nuclear reactors. The uranium fraction is very low in radioactivity and can be stored in specialized warehouses.

Long-term storage of radioactive waste requires the stabilization of the waste into a form that will neither react nor degrade for extended periods. Decades of research efforts have shown that a viable way to do this is through vitrification. High temperature treated ("calcined") fuel separation fractions are fed into an induction heated furnace with fragmented glass. The resulting glass contains the waste products which are bonded to the glass matrix. The fission products, which make up around 4% of the spent fuel mass, are the ones that are vitrified in this glass, as they cannot be used for any other purpose, and are generally highly radioactive. In practice, because of limits to separation of the three categories, a small amount of transuranic isotopes will be present in this material.

== History ==
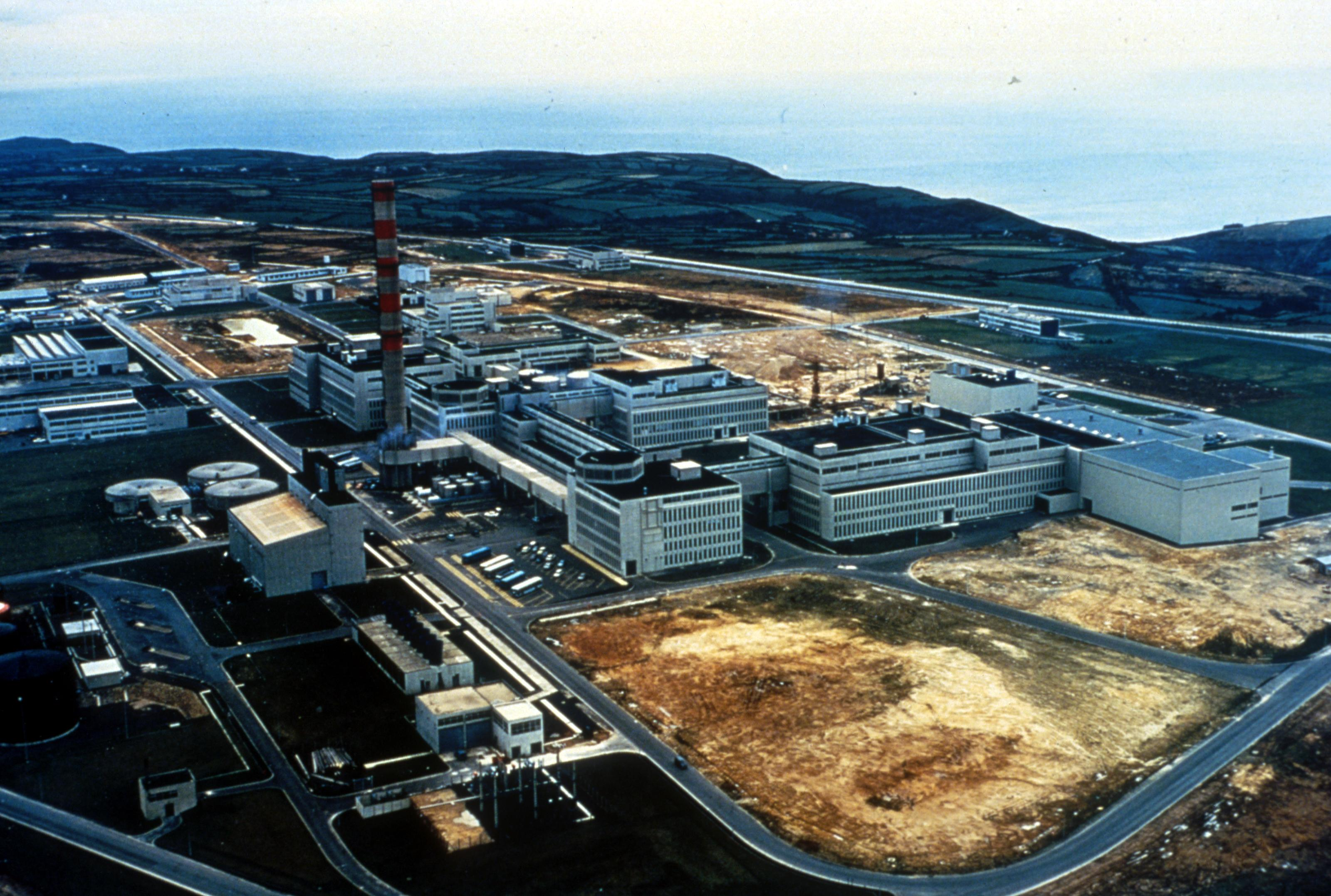
La Hague in its early years

The La Hague site was built after the Marcoule site originally for producing plutonium for military purposes. In 1969 the French military, having had a sufficient supply of plutonium for weapons, had no further use of the reprocessing centre. The factory directed its efforts toward civil operations, and with the reduction of 350 people from the plant's workforce, its military connections ended.

This shift to civil uses was supported by Valéry Giscard d'Estaing and strengthened by the 1973 oil crisis.

It was understood that the facility would be used to reprocess the uranium sold to Taiwan in the 1980s and a number of politicians and experts from Taiwan listed the La Hague site in the course of securing the deal. France later reneged on the agreement and the nuclear material sold to Taiwan remains unreprocessed and is stored in temporary cooling ponds.

On 5 October 2002, an INES Level 1 incident occurred at La Hague. A sub-contractor working at the plant suffered skin contamination while rinsing equipment in the plutonium purification workshop.

In 2013, a national decree acts the end of operations and dismantling of the oldest UP2 400 plant. The dismantling operations are managed by Orano DS (formerly STMI).

In 2024, the "Aval du Futur" (Downstream of the Future) program was announced, a plan to build several new nuclear processing facilities in France by 2040–2050, including two new plants in La Hague: "UP4" and "Melox 2". UP4 will follow the blueprint of the currently operating UP3 at La Hague, and Melox 2 will follow the blueprint of Melox at the Marcoule Nuclear Site. Both facilities will be built next to each others, therefore allowing the direct flow of plutonium between them to produce MOX fuel, rather than the current inter-regional transfers.

== Controversy surrounding radioactive releases ==
Greenpeace has been campaigning since 1997 for the shutdown of the site, which they claim dumps "one million litres of liquid radioactive waste per day" into the ocean; "the equivalent of 50 nuclear waste barrels", claiming the radiation affects local beaches, although official figures are to the contrary.

Greenpeace have protested by creating roadblocks and chaining themselves to vehicles transporting materials to and from the site. However the leader of Greenpeace France, Yannick Rousselet, has since stated that they have ceased attempting to criticize the reprocessing plant on technical challenge grounds, COGEMA having succeeded at performing the process without serious spills that have been frequent at other such facilities around the world. In the past, the antinuclear movement argued that COGEMA would not succeed with reprocessing. Eric Blanc, deputy director of the processing plant, says that although the plant does intentionally release radioactive material, the annual dose in the vicinity of the facility is less than 20 microsieverts per year, which is equivalent to the dose of cosmic radiation received during a single transatlantic flight, and therefore within regulation. The AREVA NC website emphasizes that they are committed to keeping the dose below 30 microsieverts per year.

== See also ==
- Similar facilities:
  - Rokkasho Reprocessing Plant in Japan
  - Thorp nuclear fuel reprocessing plant (Sellafield), in the United Kingdom
- Nuclear waste management in France
