= Meuse/Haute Marne Underground Research Laboratory =

Rock laboratory aimed to characterize the Callovo-Oxfordian Clay

Coordinates: 48°29′04″N 5°21′23″E

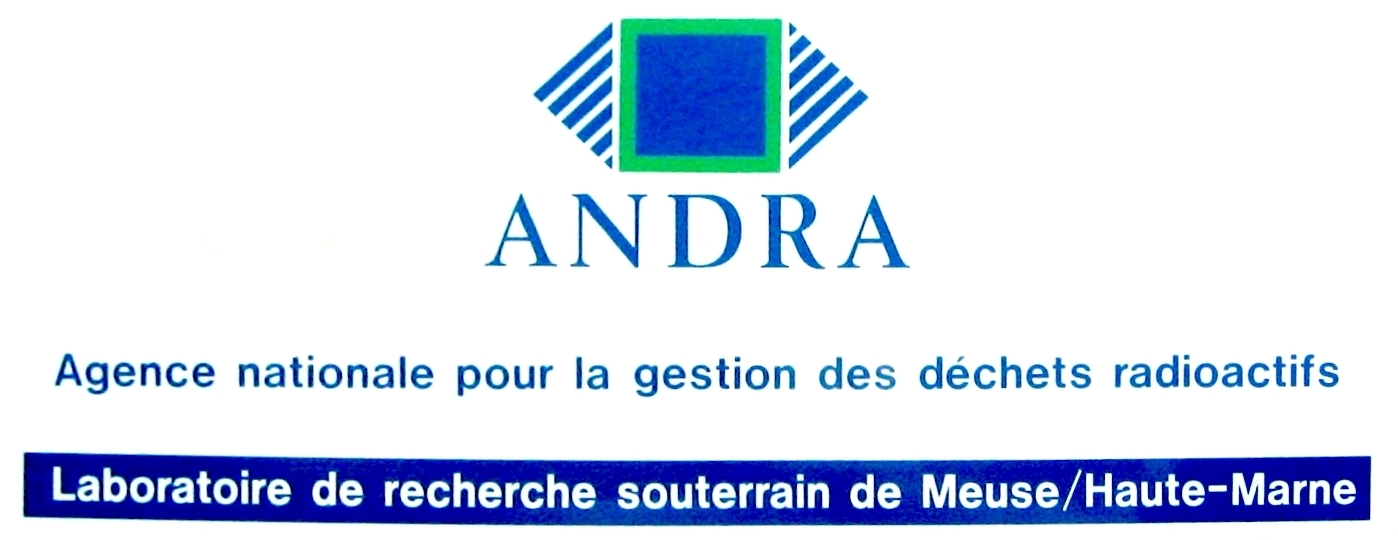
Entrance sign

The Meuse/Haute Marne Underground Research Laboratory is a laboratory located 500 metres underground in Bure in the Meuse département. It allows study of the geological formation in order to evaluate its capacity for deep geological repository of high-level and long-lived medium-level radioactive waste. It is managed by the Agence nationale pour la gestion des déchets radioactifs, the French nuclear waste management authority.

Since radioactive waste needs to be safely stored for extreme lengths of time, the geology of the area is of utmost importance. Geologically, this site chiefly consists of Kimmeridgian claystone 500 metres underground in the Paris Basin. The exploratory work was for the Cigéo project which would store medium-level waste from 2025 onwards at Bure. These plans have been met with protests.

== History ==
The first practical geological studies on locations for deep geological repository in France date back to the 1960s. In the 1980s Andra, at that time a branch of the CEA, was given the task of investigating possible locations for an underground research laboratory.

=== Site selection ===
Two geological formations were initially considered in the 1990s: clay and granite. The 1991 law thus dictated that research would be done in several possible sites.

In 1994, work by Andra investigated a wide range of locations in 4 separate départements, and further narrowed down the choice to 3 locations.

Départements under investigation by the 1993 government report

Sites selected by Andra in 1994

== Layout ==
All above and below ground facilities at the site are organized around two wells.

=== Surface installations ===
There are headframes above each well for transporting equipment and people in and out. Then there is a host of other surface buildings and factories for research, which occupy a total of 170,000 square metres. The reception building has a Green roof.

=== Tunnels ===
As of 2007, a 40 metre long tunnel had been completed at the 445 m underground level, while almost 500 m of tunnels have been excavated at the 490 m underground level. Further extensions were built between 2007 and 2009 and more are scheduled, to be completed by 2015.

Mining Techniques

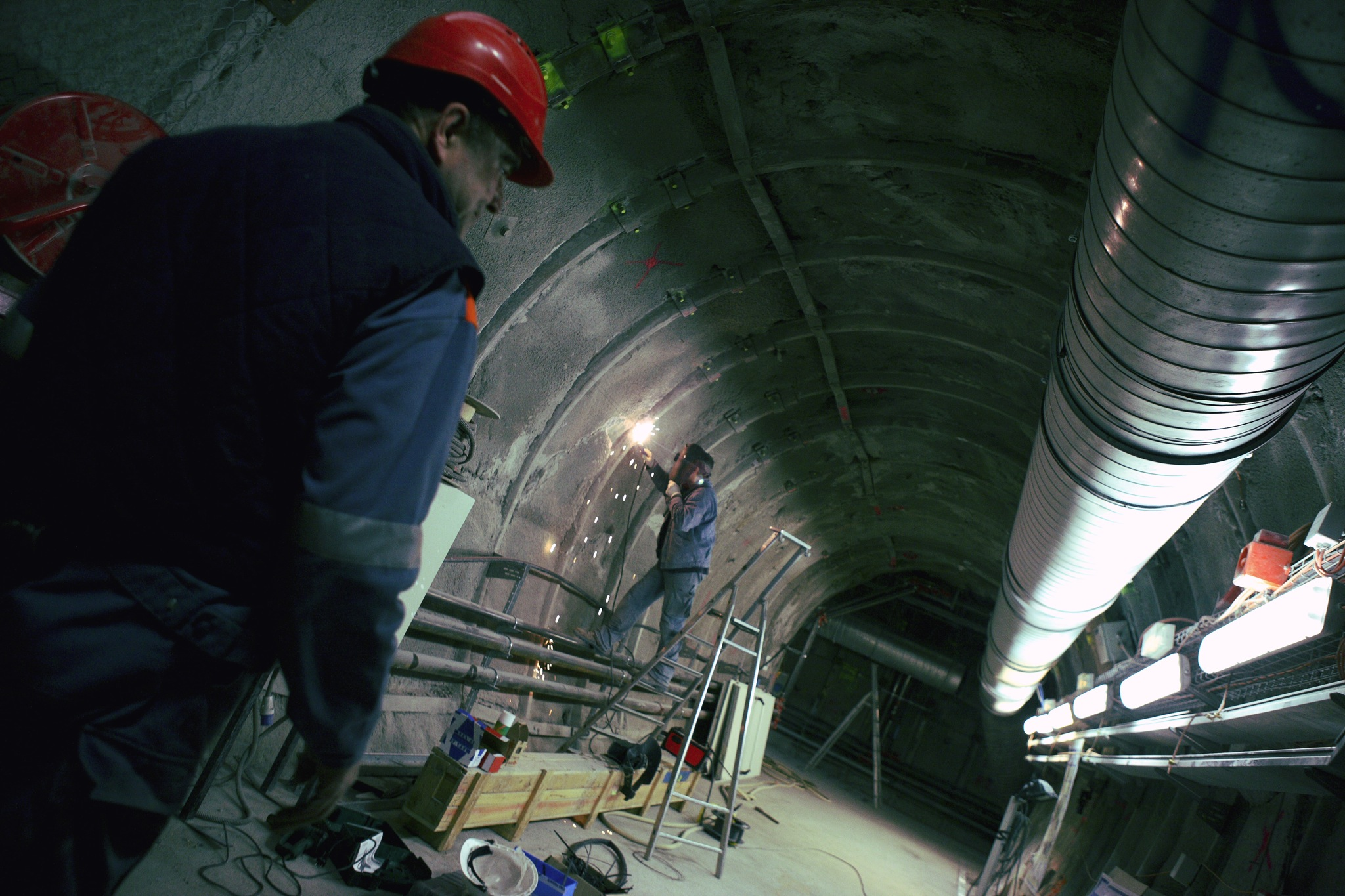
Underground laboratory. Walls are concrete reinforced with a metal frame.

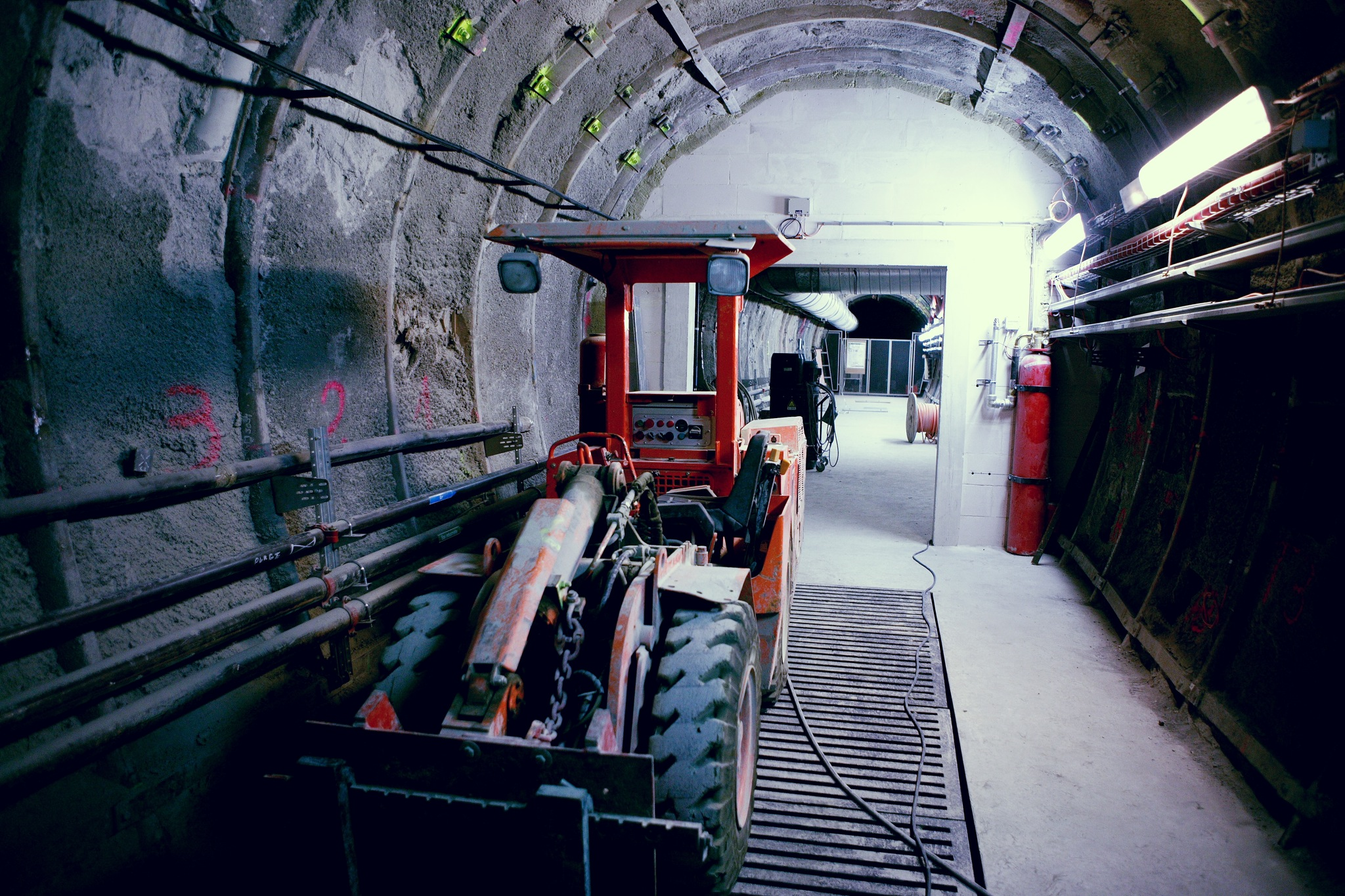
Work vehicle.

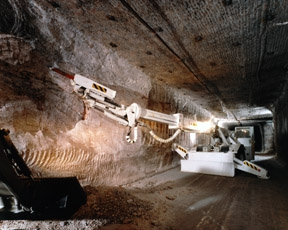
Rock-breaker (in use at the Waste Isolation Pilot Plant).

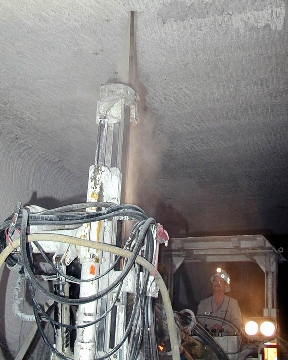
Bolting machine (in use at the Waste Isolation Pilot Plant).

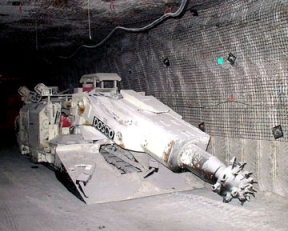
Road header mining machine technology will be implemented in 2007 (e.g. in use at the Waste Isolation Pilot Plant).

== Cigéo ==
After 20 years of exploratory research, ANDRA intends to file in 2019 a request to build Cigéo (French: Centre Industriel de Stockage Géologique), which will store underground the most radioactive waste from French nuclear power stations. The Nuclear Safety Authority has confirmed that the rock has not moved for several million years, although it wants a solution to be found to the problem of bitumen deposits.

The future storage centre would have an area of 600 hectares, for 250 kilometres of galleries. It is proposed to store 70,000 cubic metres of intermediate-level waste and 10,000 cubic metres of long-lived high-level vitrified waste. The French nuclear energy industry produces around 13,000 cubic metres of toxic radioactive waste every year.

The project was initially estimated to cost between €13.5 and €16.5 billion in 2005. In 2009 costs were re-estimated at €36 billion. In 2012 ANDRA revised costs to €34.4 billion, including taxes and operational costs for 100 years, however EDF and the CEA estimated €20 billion. The French government budgeted €25 billion in 2016.

== Retrievability ==
French law stipulates that for the first few hundreds of years the stored material must be safely retrievable, insofar as future Frenchmen may find it useful. The storage facility is therefore being designed for this purpose.

== Protests ==
Several groups have opposed the building of the waste storage facility, including Burestop 55, Bure Zone Libre and EODRA (Élus opposés à l'enfouissement des déchets radioactifs).

A Maison de la Résistance (House of Resistance) was set up by anti-nuclear activists in the centre of Bure in 2004. The forest of Mandres-en-Barrois, the site of proposed air vents for the expanded site, was occupied in 2015. It became a ZAD (Zone to Defend) before being evicted in 2018.

== See also ==
- Mont Terri Rock Laboratory (swisstopo, Saint-Ursanne, CH)
- Grimsel Test Site (GTS, Rock Laboratory in granite, CH)
- HADES Underground Research Laboratory (SCK CEN, Mol, BE)
- Bedretto Underground Laboratory for Geoenergies (ETH Zurich, CH)
