= Bure, Meuse =

Bure
- Commune
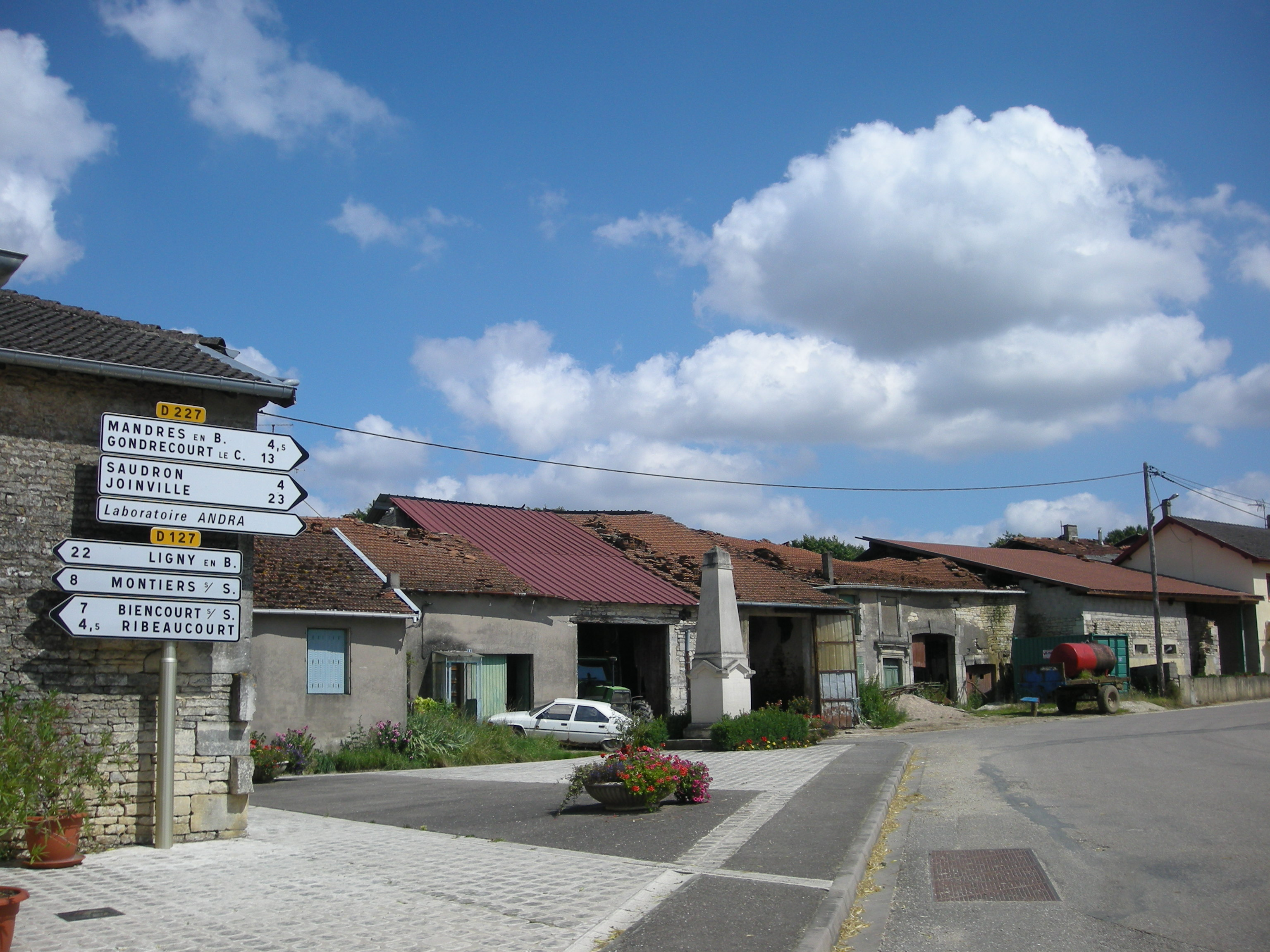
- The war memorial and surroundings in Bure

- Coat of arms
- Location of Bure
- Location within France Location within Grand Est
- Coordinates: 48°30′20″N 5°21′27″E
- Country: France
- Region: Grand Est
- Department: Meuse
- Arrondissement: Bar-le-Duc
- Canton: Ligny-en-Barrois

Government
  - Mayor (2020–2026): Gérard Antoine
- Area^{1}: 18.39 km^{2} (7.10 sq mi)
- Elevation: 335 m (1,099 ft)
- Highest elevation: 399 m (1,309 ft)
- Lowest elevation: 298 m (978 ft)
- Population (2023): 93
  - Density: 5.1/km^{2} (13/sq mi)
- Time zone: UTC+01:00 (CET)
  - Summer (DST): UTC+02:00 (CEST)
- INSEE/Postal code: 55087 /55290
- ^{1} French Land Register data, which excludes lakes, ponds, glaciers > 1 km^{2} (0.386 sq mi or 247 acres) and river estuaries.

Bure (French pronunciation: [byʁ]) is a commune in the Meuse department in Grand Est in northeastern France.

It hosts the Meuse/Haute Marne Underground Research Laboratory for radioactive waste storage.

== Population ==
Historical population
Year	Pop.	±% p.a.
1968	119	—
1975	106	−1.64%
1982	105	−0.14%
1990	92	−1.64%
1999	85	−0.88%
2007	92	+0.99%
2012	86	−1.34%
2017	84	−0.47%
2023	93	+1.71%
Source: INSEE

== See also ==
- Communes of the Meuse department
