= Tricastin Nuclear Site =

Nuclear industrial site in France

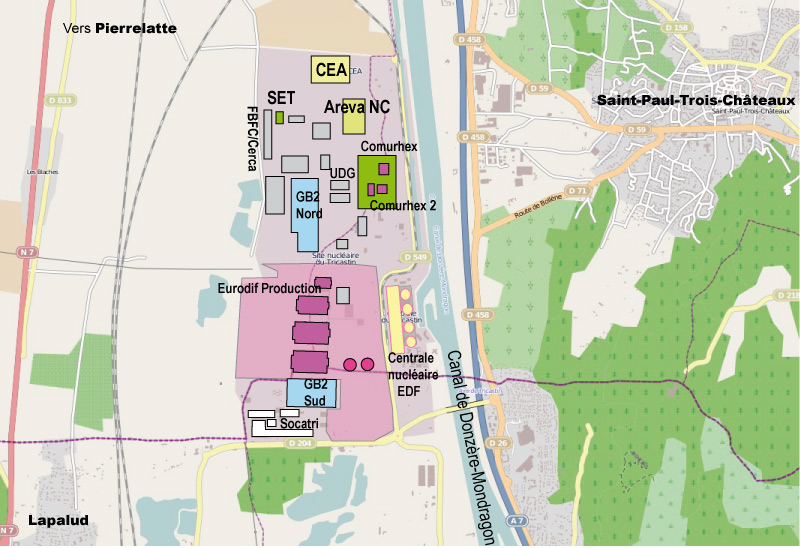
- Simplified map of the site.
- Official name: Site nucléaire du Tricastin
- Country: France
- Location: Drôme & Vaucluse
- Coordinates: 44°20′09″N 04°43′21″E

External links
- Commons: Related media on Commons

The Tricastin Nuclear Site is an industrial site that encompasses facilities of the nuclear fuel cycle and a nuclear power plant. It is located in France, in the lower Rhône valley, at the heart of the historic Tricastin region, on the right bank of the Canal de Donzère-Mondragon (a diversion canal of the Rhône) between Valence (70 kilometres (43 mi) upstream) and Avignon (65 kilometres (40 mi) downstream). It covers an area of 600 hectares, spread across four communes: Saint-Paul-Trois-Châteaux and Pierrelatte in Drôme, and Bollène and Lapalud in Vaucluse. The nuclear power plant has been subject to several reported incidents and was placed under "enhanced surveillance" in 2017.

== History ==
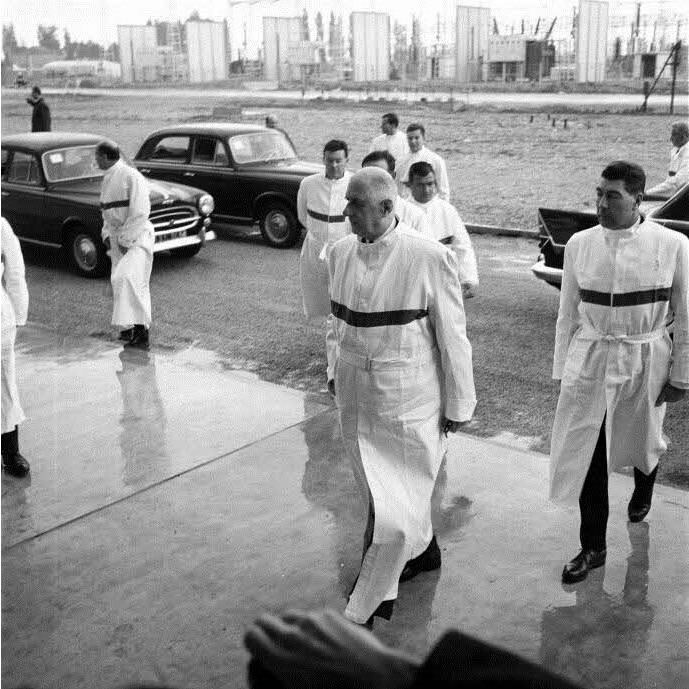
President Charles de Gaulle visiting the facilities at Pierrelatte and Cadarache, September 23, 1963.

The proper name "Tricastin" originates from the historic region in which the site is located. This region takes its name from a tribe of Celto-Ligurian origin that lived in the area: the Tricastini, peoples of Gallia Narbonensis who lived along the Rhône, and whose capital was named Augusta Tricastinorum by Pliny and Silius Italicus. The land they inhabited is now known as Saint-Paul-Trois-Châteaux.

In 1958, General de Gaulle sought to equip France with nuclear weapons, and the Tricastin site was chosen to host the Pierrelatte Military Enrichment Plant. In 1961, the CEA established the site to produce highly enriched uranium for the manufacture of nuclear bombs. In 1962, the Société des Usines Chimiques de Pierrelatte (SUCP) began operations, producing uranium hexafluoride (UF_{6}) to supply the future Gaseous Diffusion Plants (UDG), which started in 1964, later managed by Comurhex.

From the 1970s, the site increasingly focused on civilian activities. Construction of the four pressurized water reactors (PWR) began in 1974 and 1975, followed by the Eurodif plant in 1978.

In the 1980s and 1990s, the FBFC plant, the Cogema uranium workshops, and the BCOT opened successively.

== Site organization ==
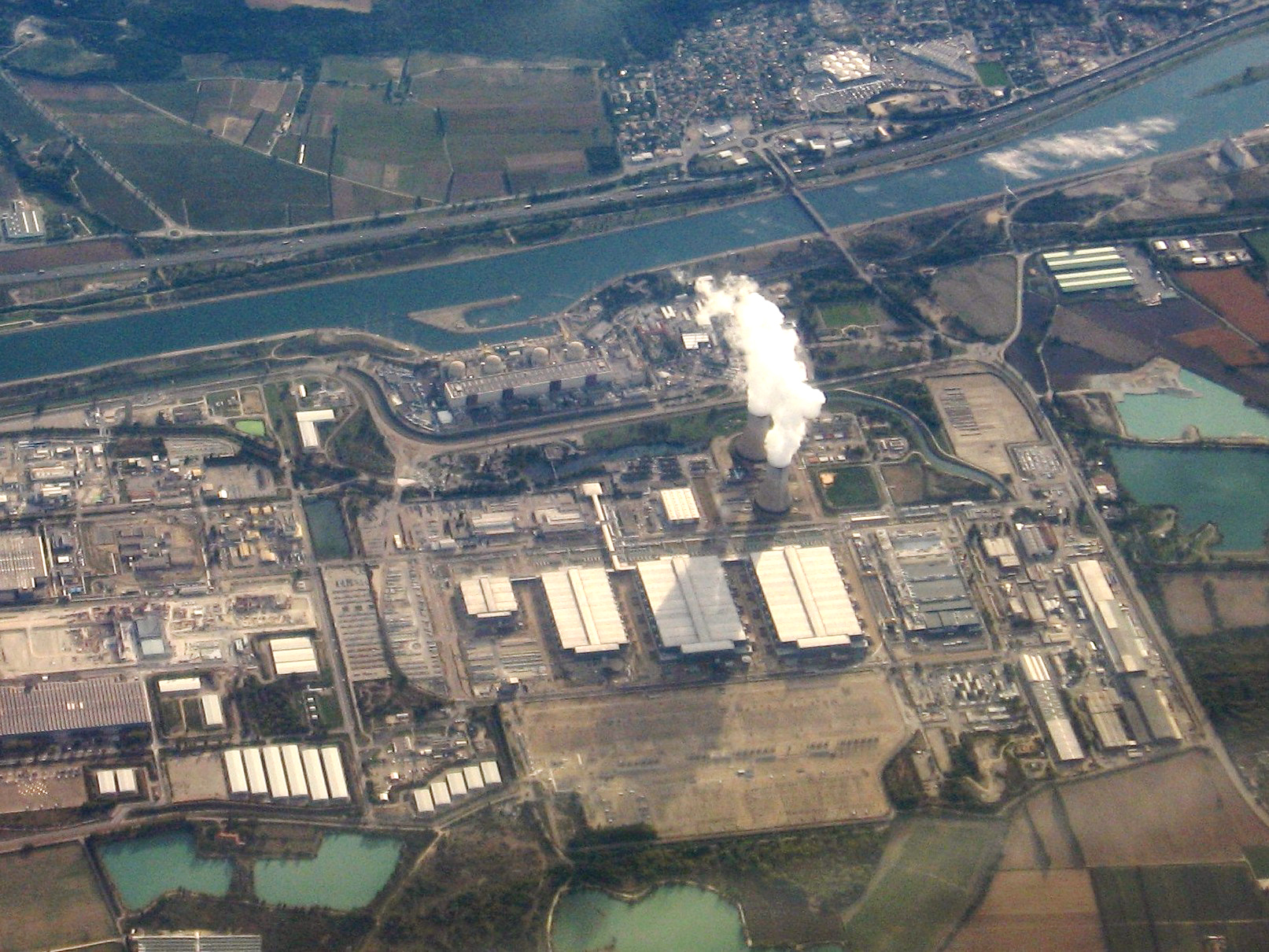
The site seen from the air.

It is the most extensive nuclear site in France, ahead of the La Hague site. The site encompasses numerous activities related to the production and operation of nuclear fuel. The first facilities began operating in the 1960s to enrich uranium for military purposes. The site is part of the Trimatec competitiveness cluster.

These companies are divided into three separate sites: the EDF site, the Orano site, which includes six companies of the Orano group, and the CEA site.

== EDF site ==
EDF operates the Tricastin Nuclear Power Plant and the Tricastin Operational Hot Base (BCOT).

=== Tricastin Nuclear Power Plant ===
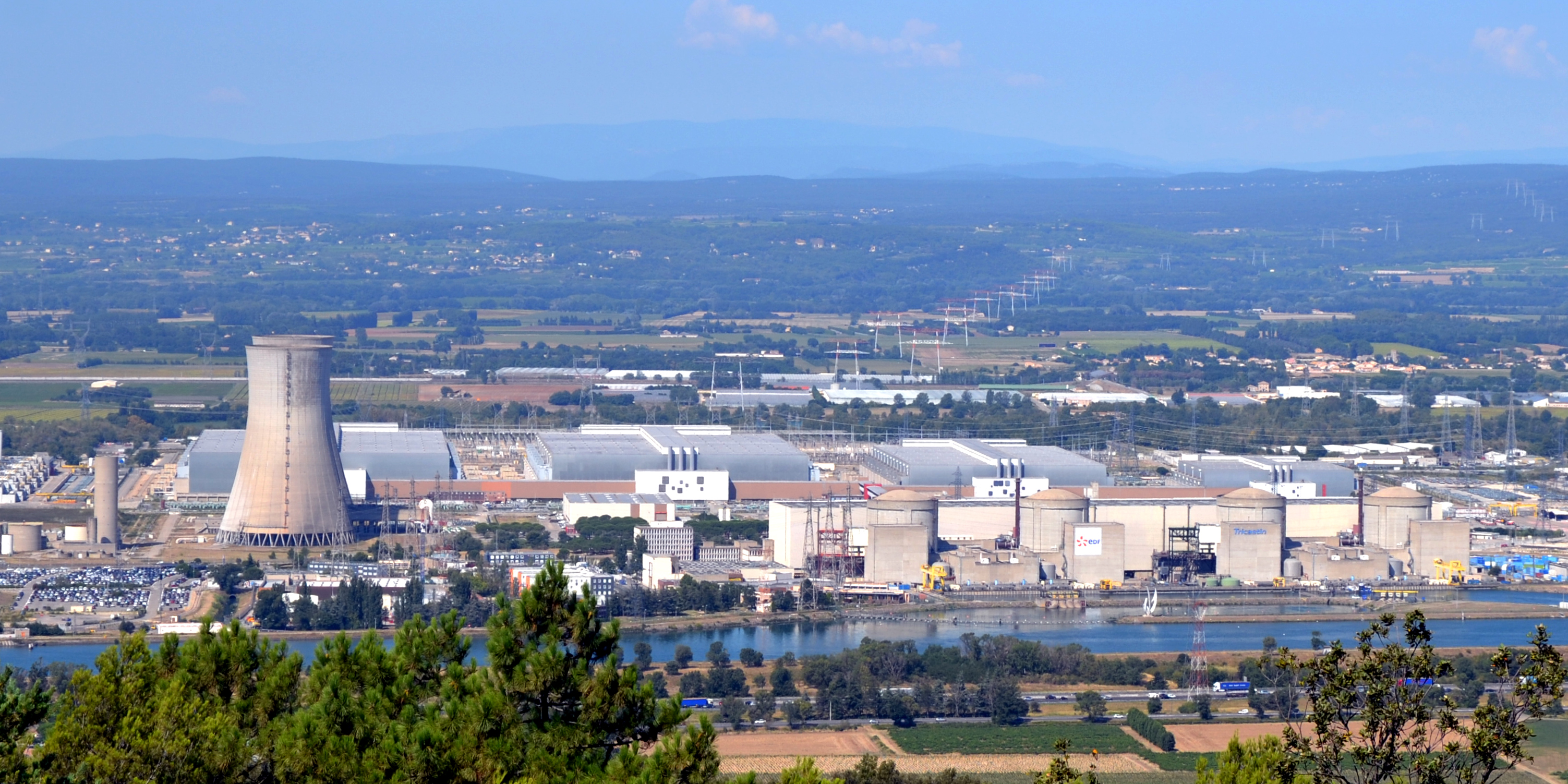
The four reactors of the Tricastin Nuclear Power Plant.

The nuclear power plant at Tricastin was built starting in 1974 and commissioned in 1980 (T1 & T2) and 1981 (T3 & T4). It comprises four pressurized water reactors (PWR) of 900 MW each, for a total capacity of 3,600 MW for the plant.

The plant’s cooling is provided by water from the Canal de Donzère-Mondragon. Fresh nuclear fuel arrives by train in the form of assemblies manufactured at FBFC. Spent fuel is stored in cooling pools for a few months before being shipped by train to the La Hague site.

The plant produces approximately 25 TWh annually, accounting for 6% of French electricity production. The nearby Eurodif enrichment plant consumed about 15 terawatt-hours (54 PJ) per year, roughly two-thirds of the plant’s output. This proximity minimized electricity transmission losses. Modifications to the enrichment process at the EURODIF plant (switching to centrifugation) reduced its electricity consumption by about 50 times.

According to an AREVA document, centrifugation consumes 50 times less electricity than gaseous diffusion and does not require water withdrawal from the Rhône. This led to the abandonment of cooling towers, which are scheduled for demolition in 2025.

EDF contributes approximately 14 million euros annually to local communities through the business tax for the Tricastin plant.

In 2019, the Tricastin Nuclear Power Plant was the first in the French nuclear fleet to undergo a fourth decennial inspection for one of its reactors, a critical step for the site’s continued operation. It thus served as a flagship for the 900 MW tier.

=== BCOT ===
The Tricastin Operational Hot Base (BCOT) is a nuclear facility specialized in nuclear maintenance. It maintains and stores equipment and tools from contaminated circuits and materials of nuclear reactors, excluding fuel elements, including guide tubes, intervention tools, equipment for nuclear decommissioning, and reactor vessel lids.

== Orano site ==
Six companies operate on the Orano site (formerly "Areva" until 2018).

=== Eurodif Production ===
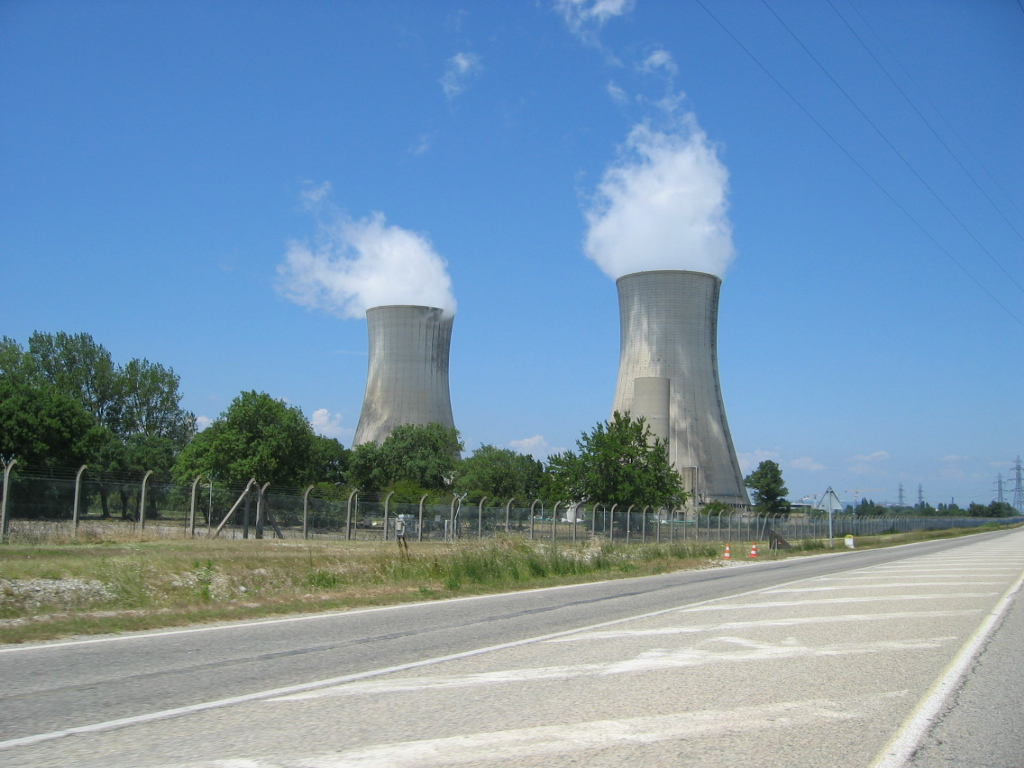
The two cooling towers of the Eurodif Production enrichment plant.

Eurodif Production operated the uranium enrichment plant Georges Besse until its decommissioning in 2012 and its replacement by the Georges Besse II Plant.

During its operation, the Georges Besse I plant was supplied with uranium (in the form of uranium hexafluoride (UF_{6})) by the Comurhex plant on the Tricastin site and with electricity by the Tricastin Nuclear Power Plant. The nuclear fuel produced by the Eurodif plant was then sent to FBFC at the Romans-sur-Isère site.

The company employed 1,067 workers at the site in 2009.

This plant was long the largest electricity consumer in France and the primary client of EDF, until its decommissioning in 2012.

=== Orano Chemistry Enrichment (CE) ===
Orano Chemistry Enrichment operates a nuclear facility specialized in processing radioactive materials from the nuclear fuel cycle: defluorination of depleted uranium hexafluoride, denitration of uranyl nitrate, container maintenance, and decommissioning of certain products. It also provides support services to the Orano Tricastin site.

The company employed 936 workers at the site in 2009.

=== Comurhex ===
Comurhex operates a nuclear facility that converts uranium tetrafluoride (UF_{4}), sourced from the Malvési site, into uranium hexafluoride (UF_{6}), which is then processed at the Georges Besse Plant on the same site by Eurodif Production to produce enriched uranium.

The company employed 353 workers at the site in 2009.

The historic Comurhex plant in Pierrelatte, built in 1962 for uranium conversion, ceased production permanently in December 2017. It was replaced by a more modern facility, Comurhex II, which began operations in 2018 and was still in testing at the time of Comurhex I’s closure. Orano confirmed that “all Comurhex I personnel will be assigned to the continued testing” of Comurhex II in 2018. Comurhex II, using new enrichment technology, reduces electricity consumption by 96% and greenhouse gas emissions by 85%.

=== FBFC ===
Franco-Belge de Fabrication du Combustible (FBFC) operates an industrial facility specialized in manufacturing fuel assembly components, assembly structure grids, control rod clusters, and plugs.

The FBFC and CERCA companies employed 135 workers at the site in 2009.

=== Socatri ===
The Tricastin Auxiliary Company (SOCATRI) handles maintenance and decommissioning of nuclear equipment, treatment of liquid nuclear and industrial effluents from its activities and those of other Orano site industries before release into the environment, and the management and treatment of nuclear waste for disposal.

The company employed 261 workers at the site in 2009.

=== SET ===
The Société d’Enrichissement du Tricastin (SET) operates the Georges Besse II uranium enrichment plant by centrifugation, which replaced the former Georges Besse plant in 2012.

This plant consists of two units, South and North, physically separated on the site, which were commissioned progressively due to their modular design.

In June 2012, the new plant reached sufficient production to take over from the Eurodif/Georges Besse plant. The old plant (Georges Besse I) was closed, with its decommissioning expected to span about fifteen years.

In 2016, Georges Besse II reached full capacity, with 7.5 MUTS (million SWU).

The company employed 141 workers at the site in 2009.

== CEA Site ==
Historically the first institute to establish itself at the Tricastin site, the CEA started operating the CEA military enrichment plant in 1964. In 1969, a partnership between the CEA and Technetics Group led to the creation of a laboratory in Pierrelatte.

Following the closure of the military plant in 1996, the CEA maintained a civilian research hub at Pierrelatte. The laboratories at the Pierrelatte site are dependent on CEA Valrho (or CEA Marcoule).

== Public information ==
Three public information and consultation bodies related to the Tricastin nuclear site coexist:

The Local Information Commission for Major Energy Facilities at Tricastin (CLIGEET), which monitors the activities of basic nuclear installations. It is chaired by the President of the Departmental Council of Drôme;

The Orano Cycle Information Commission, which monitors the activities of the secret basic nuclear installation. This is a nuclear facility whose activities require special protection for national defense reasons. It is chaired by the Prefect of Drôme;

The Local Information and Consultation Committee (CLIC), which monitors the activities of installations classified for environmental protection (ICPE), such as COMURHEX. It is chaired by the Prefect of Drôme.

== Nuclear safety ==
Tricastin is the nuclear power plant that has been subject to the most reports since its commissioning in 1980. "The ASN lists 264 incidents, including seven level 2 incidents on the INES international nuclear event scale".

However, “the ASN considers that the nuclear safety and radiation protection performance of the Tricastin nuclear power production center stands out positively, while its environmental protection performance is below the general assessment of performance by the Nuclear Safety Authority for EDF”.

According to the Nuclear Safety Authority, safety analysis adequately accounts for the risks of external aggressions (aircraft crash, earthquake, external flooding, etc.).

=== Seismic risk ===
In 2002 and 2003, EDF reported two generic level 1 incidents on the INES scale related to the seismic resistance of components in some 900 MW French PWRs, including those at the Tricastin plant.

The incident reported on 14 October 2002 concerned the seismic resistance of water tanks used to cool the reactor core in case of an accident. The necessary corrective work at the plant was completed in December 2005.

The incident reported on 28 October 2003 concerned the seismic resistance of piping connected to one of the water tanks affected by the 14 October 2002 incident.

=== Fire risk ===
Regarding the nuclear power plant, the ASN noted in 2007 that "the site still needed to improve in managing training, issuing fire permits, and reducing intervention times in case of fire, which remain too long".

Regarding the Georges Besse plant of Eurodif, the ASN noted in 2007 that "the fire risk was well managed, but improvements were expected, particularly in personnel training and the drafting of fire permits".

=== Intrusions ===
On Monday 15 July 2013, Greenpeace succeeded with 29 activists in entering the nuclear power plant’s perimeter in 15 minutes and reaching the protected area, though they did not reach the nuclear reactors. The group projected anti-nuclear messages such as “Tricastin nuclear accident” onto the plant’s structure before being arrested.

On 21 February 2020, 34 activists from Greenpeace again entered the Tricastin plant to denounce the numerous vulnerabilities justifying its shutdown. Twenty of them began a symbolic decommissioning of the plant for its 40th anniversary. This action prompted intervention by the PSPG of Tricastin and the GIGN from Orange.

On June 29, 2021, the public prosecutor requested leniency, considering the Greenpeace activists’ motives serious, before the Valence correctional court, while holding EDF and the State accountable for their responsibilities.

The lawyer Thibault de Montbrial, representing the interests of the plaintiff, requested 500,000 euros in damages for EDF’s moral prejudice. The magistrate called for “relativizing” EDF’s image in response, noting that the company had also “tarnished” its image “through resounding failures,” alluding to the financial overrun at the EPR in Flamanville as well as the accidents at Three Mile Island (United States), Chernobyl (Ukraine), and Fukushima (Japan), adding that nuclear sites “all represent a danger”.

== Environmental impacts ==
=== Incidents ===
==== Uranium leak of 2008 ====
During the night of July 7 to 8 July 2008, during the cleaning of a tank, a uranium-bearing solution was released onto the site and into nearby rivers. Socatri, an Areva subsidiary, reported that the volume of effluent released was 6.25 metres (20.505 ft), with the amount of uranium released estimated at 75 kilograms (165 lb). 224 kilograms (494 lb) of uranium overflowed from a treatment tank, of which 74 kilograms (163 lb) reached the Gaffière river and the Lauzon river. This incident was provisionally classified at level 1 on the International Nuclear Event Scale (equivalent to an “operational anomaly”) by the Nuclear Safety Authority. Socatri reported the incident to the ASN 8 and 30 after the event.

The Sortir du nucléaire network filed a complaint against an unspecified party, specifically targeting the operator Socatri-Areva and the Nuclear Safety Authority, and the CRIIRAD was also expected to file a complaint against the operator. The Sortir du nucléaire network accused Areva of deliberately endangering the population by informing affected communities late about the pollution. The municipalities were notified 12 hours after the incident. The prefecture issued a ban on fishing, swimming, and irrigation, as well as restrictions on water consumption in the municipalities of Bollène, Lapalud, and Lamotte-du-Rhône.

The ASN requested on 11 July that Socatri suspend the activity of its treatment plant and take “immediate safety measures”.

Uranium concentration measurements taken between July 8 and 13 July in the groundwater at Tricastin revealed "values [that] cannot be explained by the accidental release", according to the IRSN. Didier Champion, the IRSN’s environmental director, stated that “it cannot be ruled out that there were previous releases responsible for uranium contamination”.

On 12 May 2015, the High Court of Carpentras fined Areva 30,000 euros in damages for releasing 74 kg of uranium onto the ground and into two waterways at the Tricastin nuclear site.

==== Carbon-14 releases in 2008 ====
Beyond its effluent management activities, SOCATRI conducts reconditioning operations for the Andra. These operations involve sorting waste from “small producers” (medical laboratories, hospitals, etc.) and directing it to appropriate disposal methods (incineration, storage). During a reconditioning operation in June 2008, a gaseous carbon 14 release (used as a tracer in medical examinations) caused the facility to exceed its monthly discharge limit for this radioisotope. The anomaly was identified during measurements on 4 July. The treatment workshop’s activities were immediately suspended. Areva stated that the ASN was informed of this incident on 7 July during a weekly meeting between the organizations.

During the shutdown operations, releases continued, leading to a 5% exceedance of the annual discharge limit on 18 July 2008. The ASN was informed of this annual limit exceedance on 5 August 2008 and decided to suspend all SOCATRI activities likely to generate gaseous carbon 14 releases for the remainder of the year. The incident was classified at level 1 on the INES scale.

==== Stuck fuel assemblies in 2008 ====
On 8 September 2008, 2 fuel assemblies became caught on the upper internal structures during a nuclear fuel replacement operation. Upon detecting the anomaly, the operation was immediately halted. The 2 assemblies remained suspended underwater in the reactor vessel, while the operator evacuated and isolated the reactor building.

The assemblies remained stuck for over a month. EDF proposed technical solutions on 14 October to recover the two assemblies. The ASN evaluated these on the “mock-up” at the Center for Experimentation and Validation of Intervention Techniques on Pressurized Water Reactor Boilers (CETIC) in Chalon-sur-Saône. On 22 October, the ASN approved the operation.

There was no risk due to criticality or lack of cooling of the assemblies during this incident.

A similar incident occurred in France in 1999 at the Nogent Nuclear Power Plant (Aube), involving one assembly, which was resolved without issue. However, the situation at Tricastin was different, with 2 contiguous assemblies suspended, compared to one in 1999.

==== Radiological contamination ====
Corinne Castanier, director of the CRIIRAD, mentioned a possible contamination from SOCATRI’s discharge pipelines or waste from a former military uranium enrichment plant that operated at the Tricastin site from 1964 to 1996 and was buried at the other end of the site.

Areva denied these claims in its statement of 16 July 2008, titled “SOCATRI répond aux allégations de la CRIIRAD”, echoed by an AFP dispatch on 9 July 2008:

According to a 1998 report by the High Commission for Atomic Energy, the mound [where military radioactive waste was buried] did cause groundwater contamination, treated by pumping from 1980 to 1998. A subsequent impact study concluded there was no health risk, and the mound has since been under simple monitoring, with measurements showing an average uranium concentration of 8 micrograms per liter, half the WHO standard.

Jean-Christophe Gariel, deputy director of the environment at IRSN, told AFP that

establishing cause-and-effect relationships between a specific facility and the contamination is not straightforward. It will require relatively thorough investigations.

The national radioactive waste inventory indicates that this mound contains 760 tonnes (750 long tons; 840 short tons) of diffusion barrier waste, with a total activity of 42 GBq (i.e., a specific activity of 55 Bq/g, classifying it as “very low activity” waste).

==== Transformer explosion in 2011 ====
On 2 July 2011, an explosion and fire occurred on an electrical transformer, which was controlled within an hour by staff and reinforced firefighters.

==== Insulator explosion in 2013 ====
An insulating support for the power lines exiting the plant (called an insulator) exploded due to aging, causing a massive electrical flash seen and heard several kilometers away (similar to lightning). This caused temporary significant concern among residents. The operator stated to the press that the reactor automatically stopped producing energy.

==== Tritium leak in 2013 ====
An abnormally high concentration of radioactive tritium was detected in the groundwater of the plant between reactors 2 and 3. On 28 August, measurements taken during an ASN inspection showed concentrations 60 to 70 times higher than usual under the reactor 3 building. For at least two weeks (the duration of available measurement results), these levels remained relatively constant at around 600 Bq/L. According to nuclear authorities, “the measured values are low, with no health or environmental impact.” However, the ASN ordered EDF to take all necessary measures to identify and address the issue. As of 1 March 2014, the incident had not been resolved.

==== Level 1 incidents in 2013 ====
During a routine inspection on 9 September 2013, workers detected a lack of weld joint reinforcements on the cooling system piping of reactors No. 2 and 4. The incident was reported to the Nuclear Safety Authority only on 14 October and classified at level 1 on the INES scale.

During an internal inspection, higher-than-normal pressure was detected on 27 September in the Eurodif uranium extraction plant at the Tricastin site. The incident was reported to the ASN, which classified it at level 1 on the INES scale.

==== Contamination of workers in 2013 ====
During work in the controlled zone shared by the auxiliary systems of reactors 3 and 4, three workers were contaminated by radioactive liquid sprayed on their clothing due to the sudden opening of a pump caused by overpressure. One was hospitalized for decontamination procedures and examinations.

==== Storm Christian in 2013 ====
During the night of October 24 to 25 October 2013, heavy rainfall caused mud accumulation at the cooling system pump intakes, leading to the shutdown of reactor 2.

==== Uranium 235/238 leak in 2013 ====
At the AREVA site, due to a sealing failure during a pneumatic transfer between two buildings, one kilogram of uranium 238 was spilled onto the ground over a few meters.

==== Non-reported incidents in 2022 ====
A judicial investigation against an unspecified party was opened on 9 June 2022, following a complaint filed against EDF in October 2021 by an anonymous site executive “for violations of regulations related to nuclear installations, the environmental code, labor law, endangerment of human life, and harassment”

The nuclear power plant was searched on September 27 and 28 September 2022, by specialized gendarmes from the Central Office for Combating Environmental and Public Health Offenses (OCLAESP) to “retrieve specific documents at the request of the investigating judges of the Marseille health division.” In October 2022, another anonymous EDF executive requested to “join as a civil party in the investigation led by a Marseille judge into suspicions of obstructing nuclear safety inspectors’ controls at the plant”.

== Aborted GDF Suez projects ==
In July 2008, Tricastin was mentioned among five potential sites (along with Flamanville, Penly, Chooz, and Marcoule) by Nicolas Sarkozy for the construction of a second EPR. However, the Penly site was ultimately chosen, then abandoned by GDF.

In February 2010, GDF Suez again considered building a reactor at the site, this time an Atmea reactor. In January 2015, Gérard Mestrallet, CEO of GDF Suez, stated that his group would “think twice” before investing in a nuclear project in France, such as the Atme a reactors at Tricastin or EPR at Penly.

== See also ==
- Nuclear power debate
- Nuclear power
- Nuclear fission
- Radioactivity
- Nuclear reactor
- Risk
