= Georges-Besse plant =

French nuclear facility (1979–2012)

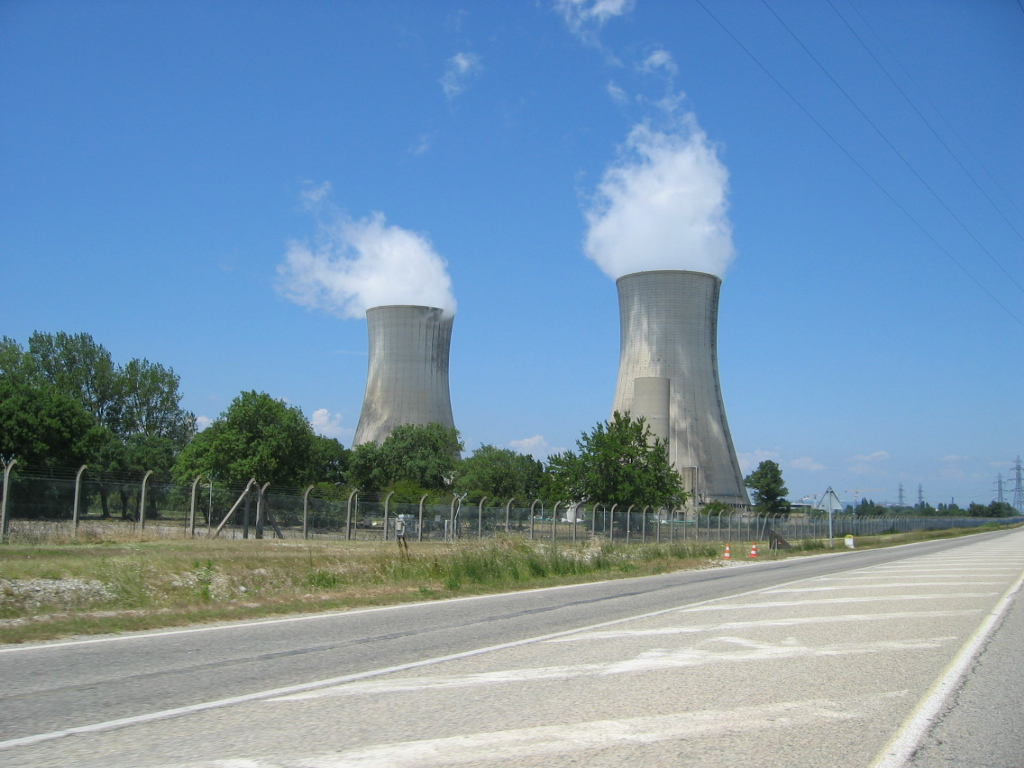
- The plant's two cooling towers
- Country: France
- Location: Rhône-Alpes, Drôme, Pierrelatte
- Coordinates: 44°19′50″N 4°43′18″E
- Status: Decommissioned
- Decommission date: 2012
- Operator: Eurodif Production

The Georges-Besse plant, known as the Eurodif plant from 1978 to 1988 (for European Gaseous Diffusion Uranium Enrichment Consortium), was a nuclear facility specializing in uranium enrichment by gaseous diffusion. The plant, now in the nuclear dismantling phase, is located on the Tricastin nuclear site at Pierrelatte in the Drôme region.

On the initiative of French President Georges Pompidou in late 1969, an agreement was signed between France, Belgium, Italy, and Spain in 1972 to give France complete autonomy over the nuclear fuel cycle. The plant was inaugurated in 1979 and operated for 33 years by Eurodif SA, a subsidiary of Areva NC. Along with Urenco, which operates based on an agreement between Germany, the UK, and the Netherlands, it was the only uranium enrichment plant operating based on a multinational agreement.

The Tricastin nuclear site comprises several nuclear facilities, the largest of which are the Tricastin nuclear power plant, the former Georges-Besse plant, and the new Georges-Besse II centrifuge enrichment plant. The centrifuge plant is getting expanded and should be completed by 2030.

The enriched uranium produced was used as fuel by French nuclear power plants and many foreign power plants. The enriched uranium produced by this plant supplied around 90 pressurized water reactors, the most widely used nuclear technology in the world, including the 58 French reactors. Eurodif SA's customers included EDF and over 30 electricity companies worldwide, and its main competitors were the United States and Russia.

== History ==
=== Genesis of the project ===
On the strength of the experience acquired with the Pierrelatte military plant, and given the need for such an enrichment facility to develop an autonomous civilian nuclear program, President Georges Pompidou proposed at the end of 1969, in The Hague, that interested European countries join in feasibility studies for an international-scale enrichment plant. An agreement was signed with the main European countries in Paris on February 25, 1972, to form an association which, under the name of Eurodif, was tasked with studying "the economic prospects associated with the construction, in Europe, of a world-competitive uranium enrichment plant using the gaseous diffusion process". The members of this association, which has a statutory lifespan of just two years, are France, Belgium, Great Britain, Italy, the Netherlands, and the Federal Republic of Germany. In 1972, Spain and Sweden were admitted to the group, but in 1973 Great Britain and the Netherlands decided to withdraw from the group.

On November 22, 1973, the French government approved the project to build the Eurodif isotope separation plant, with a capacity of 9 million SWU. The CEA was entrusted with its construction. At the same time, Eurodif's capital is increased from 100,000 to 100 million francs to meet initial financial requirements. Georges Besse is appointed Chairman of Eurodif's board of directors. Two sites compete: the French site at Tricastin in the Rhône valley, and the Tarquinia site in Italy. In February 1974, the Tricastin site was chosen. The cost was estimated at 7.4 billion francs in 1973, to which should be added around 5 billion francs for the construction of four E.D.F. nuclear reactors to supply the 3,600 MW of electricity required for its operation.

The Arab-Israeli conflict, in particular the 1973 Yom Kippur War, and the first oil crisis, which caused the price of oil to double twice in October 1973, brutally highlighted the energy dependence of Western countries and their fragility in this area at a time when France was experiencing extraordinary economic growth. A major electronuclear program was then launched, under the name of the "Mesmer Plan". The enrichment plant was urgently needed.

=== Iran's entry into Eurodif ===
In 1974, Iran acquired Sweden's 10% share in Eurodif, following a Franco-Iranian agreement dated June 27. This agreement provided for the sale by France of five American atomic power plants (Framatome license), the supply of enriched uranium to Iran, the construction by Technicatome of a nuclear center comprising three research reactors, the joint exploitation of uranium deposits that might be discovered in Iran and of deposits in third countries, the training of Iranian scientists, as well as "Iran's access to the uranium enrichment industry".

The French Alternative Energies and Atomic Energy Commission (CEA) and the Atomic Energy Organization of Iran founded Sofidif (Société franco-iranienne pour l'enrichissement de l'uranium par diffusion gazeuse), owning 60% and 40% respectively. In return, Sofidif acquired a 25% stake in Eurodif, giving Iran a blocking minority in Eurodif. The remaining 75% of Eurodif was divided between the CEA (27.8% of shares), and three minority shareholders (Italy, Spain, Belgium).

As a shareholder, Iran had the right to take 10% of the uranium enriched by Eurodif. Reza Shah Pahlavi lent one billion US dollars following an agreement signed in December 1974, during Prime Minister Jacques Chirac's official trip to Teheran, and providing for Iran's entry into Eurodif, then a further 180 million USD in 1977 for the construction of the Eurodif plan to have the right to purchase 10% of the site's enriched uranium production.

=== Authorization and construction ===
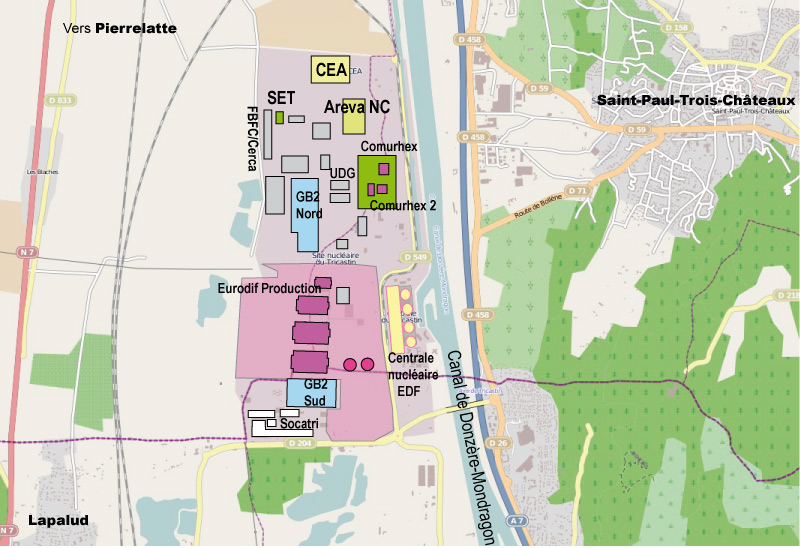
Location of the George-Besse plant operated by Eurodif Production on the Tricastin nuclear site.

The decree of September 8, 1979 finally authorized Eurodif Production (European Gaseous Diffusion Uranium Enrichment Consortium) to set up a gaseous diffusion uranium enrichment plant at the Tricastin nuclear site in Pierrelatte. Belgians, Spaniards, and Italians take part in the program. Following the assassination of Georges Besse on November 17, 1986, by terrorists from the "Action Directe" group, the Eurodif plant was named "Georges Besse" in his memory on March 5, 1988.

=== Dispute with Iran and assassination of Georges Besse ===
During the Islamic Revolution of 1979, Ayatollah Khomeini, exiled to France, returned to Iran and seized power. Initially supported by France and the United States, whose sole aim was to topple the Shah, Iran's leaders soon turned against Paris and Washington. Teheran suspended payments and demanded repayment of the loan by putting pressure on France.

In 1981, following the commissioning of the Eurodif plant, Iran demanded 10% of the enriched uranium production to which it was contractually entitled, which France refused. From 1981 to 1991, the mullahs' regime was suspected of carrying out several assassinations, hostage-takings, and murderous attacks: probably hundreds of French people paid with their lives before France and Iran settled the Eurodif dispute.

On November 17, 1986, after several deadly attacks in Paris, attributed (for those in September) to the LARF (led by Georges Ibrahim Abdallah) and the hostage-taking of French journalists (Jean-Paul Kauffmann, Michel Seurat, etc.) in Lebanon by groups linked to Iran, France signed a partial agreement, providing for the repayment of 330 million dollars, but refused to supply any enriched uranium. On the same day, Georges Besse, CEO of Renault and founder of Eurodif, was assassinated. According to Dominique Lorentz, the terrorists singled him out when they targeted the Pub Renault on September 14, 1986.

According to Dominique Lorentz, Action Directe, which took responsibility for Besse's assassination, was linked to FARL [ref. to be confirmed]; organizations that "acted in this instance on behalf of the Islamic Republic, in the same way as Islamic Jihad and Hezbollah". This information, which comes from the French anti-terrorist intelligence services, is questioned by others, who point to the paradox of a Marxist-Leninist-inspired group supporting the "mullahs' regime".

The $330 million payment was made on November 22, 1986. However, the Iranians claimed that there were other elements to the dispute. Reza Amrollahi, Deputy Prime Minister and President of the Atomic Energy Organization of Iran, visited the Eurodif plant in France in December 1986, proposing the resumption of nuclear cooperation, but no agreement was signed.

=== Hostages in Lebanon and agreement with Iran ===
According to D. Lorentz, the Lebanese hostage affair was inextricably linked to the settlement of the Eurodif financial dispute. On December 24, 1986, a hostage was released, but on January 13, 1987, journalist Roger Auque was kidnapped in Beirut. Recalling Lorentz's investigation, Le Dauphiné libéré wrote: "Diplomats Marcel Carton and Marcel Fontaine, journalist Jean-Paul Kauffman held hostage for over 3 years in Lebanon, the murderous attacks on Fnac and the Renault Pub, the assassination of Georges Besse, head of the French nuclear industry and hostile to negotiations with Iran, and many others, paid the price of the Eurodif dispute in the 1980s.

Foreign Minister Roland Dumas intervened in the settlement of the financial dispute by holding talks with his counterpart Ali Akbar Velayati in February 1989, although two years later, the assassination of former Prime Minister Shapour Bakhtiar put an end to the rapprochement. In January 2008, Roland Dumas declared: "It was I who negotiated the repayment of Iran's debt in Eurodif. Iran still has a tiny share in this consortium. This could be a means of negotiation to enable the Western powers to control Iran's nuclear weapons if everyone agreed".

=== Financial agreement ===
Finally, an agreement was reached in 1991, some points of which remain secret: France repaid more than 1.6 billion dollars while Eurodif was compensated for orders canceled by Iran. Iran was reinstated as a shareholder in Eurodif via a Franco-Iranian consortium called Sofidif, with the right to take 10% of the enriched uranium for civilian use.

According to Enerzine, "French diplomatic sources indicate that Iran is indeed a member of Eurodif. But in the absence of a civil nuclear power plant operating in Iran, there is no delivery of enriched uranium". On April 11, 2007, the Ministry of Foreign Affairs reaffirmed Iran's shareholding in Eurodif, while asserting that under the terms of the 1991 agreement, Iran has no right to remove enriched uranium or to access nuclear technologies, but only to the financial gains resulting from its presence in the consortium. However, due to United Nations Security Council Resolution 1737 (December 23, 2006), which freezes the assets of the Atomic Energy Organization of Iran, the funds due are currently blocked.

=== Closure ===
At the time of construction, the plant's lifespan was estimated at 25 years, which would have led to the end of operations in 2003. However, maintenance and building modernization operations have extended this lifespan by 9 years.

Eurodif's closure and dismantling date was the subject of difficult negotiations between EDF and Areva, for which former French Prime Minister François Fillon called for a rapid agreement.

In 2011, the Fukushima disaster led to a sharp drop in global demand for enriched uranium. Until the Fukushima accident in March 2011, the Georges-Besse plant had been supplying the Japanese power plants. The plant's closure was therefore brought forward to May 10, 2012.

=== Dismantling ===
On June 7, 2012, the plant definitively ceased enrichment activities. Dismantling will begin with the recovery of around 300 tonnes of radioactive and chemical materials to lower the level of radioactivity. To this end, the PRISME process (intensive rinsing followed by venting of Eurodif) is due to start in February 2013. This prismatic process will use tons of chlorine trifluoride, the first time in the world that such a tonnage will be used, to wash so many pipes.

According to the network sortir du nucléaire, dismantling the plant will entail a risk for workers, as well as an increase in discharges from the facility.

A public inquiry was opened in early 2017, before the dismantling of the enrichment plant. Thirty years of work are planned to evacuate 300,000 tonnes of waste, including 200,000 tonnes of very low-level long-lived radioactive waste, in particular 150,000 tonnes of steel. Since 2015, an initial clean-up phase has been completed, enabling the recovery of 350 tonnes of uranium hexafluoride. Work is due to start in 2018, with an average workforce of 300.

== Description ==
The plant, named Georges Besse in 1988 after the first chairman of Eurodif Production's management board, was a nuclear facility specializing in the isotopic separation of uranium by gaseous diffusion. It supplied enriched uranium to some forty electricity producers around the world, including Électricité de France, representing some one hundred nuclear reactors. In 2007, it produced a quarter of the world's enriched uranium.

== Nuclear safety ==
=== Regulatory framework ===
The plant was authorized by the decree of September 8, 1977, modified by the decree of June 22, 1984.

The law of June 13, 2006, on nuclear transparency and safety, known as the TSN law, in particular article 29, stipulates that nuclear facilities must be authorized by a decree of the Prime minister, following instruction by the competent authorities. To this end, the operator must submit a dossier demonstrating how the facility will operate, minimizing the impact on man and the environment, and controlling the associated risks. After a technical appraisal, the public is consulted through a public inquiry and other bodies (Local Information Commission, Environmental Authority, Nuclear Safety Authority). The decree authorizing the creation of the facility defines its perimeter and characteristics, as well as the specific rules and technical specifications with which the operator must comply.

Under these new regulations, the Georges-Besse II plant is basic nuclear facility number 93, authorized by the decree of April 27, 2007, which amended the previous decree of 1984.

== See also ==
- Enriched uranium
- Nuclear program of Iran
- Saint-Maurice-de-Beynost plant

== Bibliography ==
- Mallevre, Alain (2006). L'histoire de l'énergie nucléaire en France de 1895 à nos jours (PDF) (in French). ARCEA.
- Lauvergeon, Anne (2004). Débat public sur la construction de l'usine Georges Besse II – Dossier du maître d'ouvrage (in French). AREVA.
- Lorentz, Dominique (2002). Secret atomique, ou la véritable histoire des otages français au Liban (in French). Les Arènes.
- Courteix, Simone (1974). La coopération européenne dans le domaine de l'enrichissement de l'uranium (in French). Annuaire Français de Droit International. pp. 773–796.
