= Tricastin Nuclear Power Plant =

Nuclear power plant in France

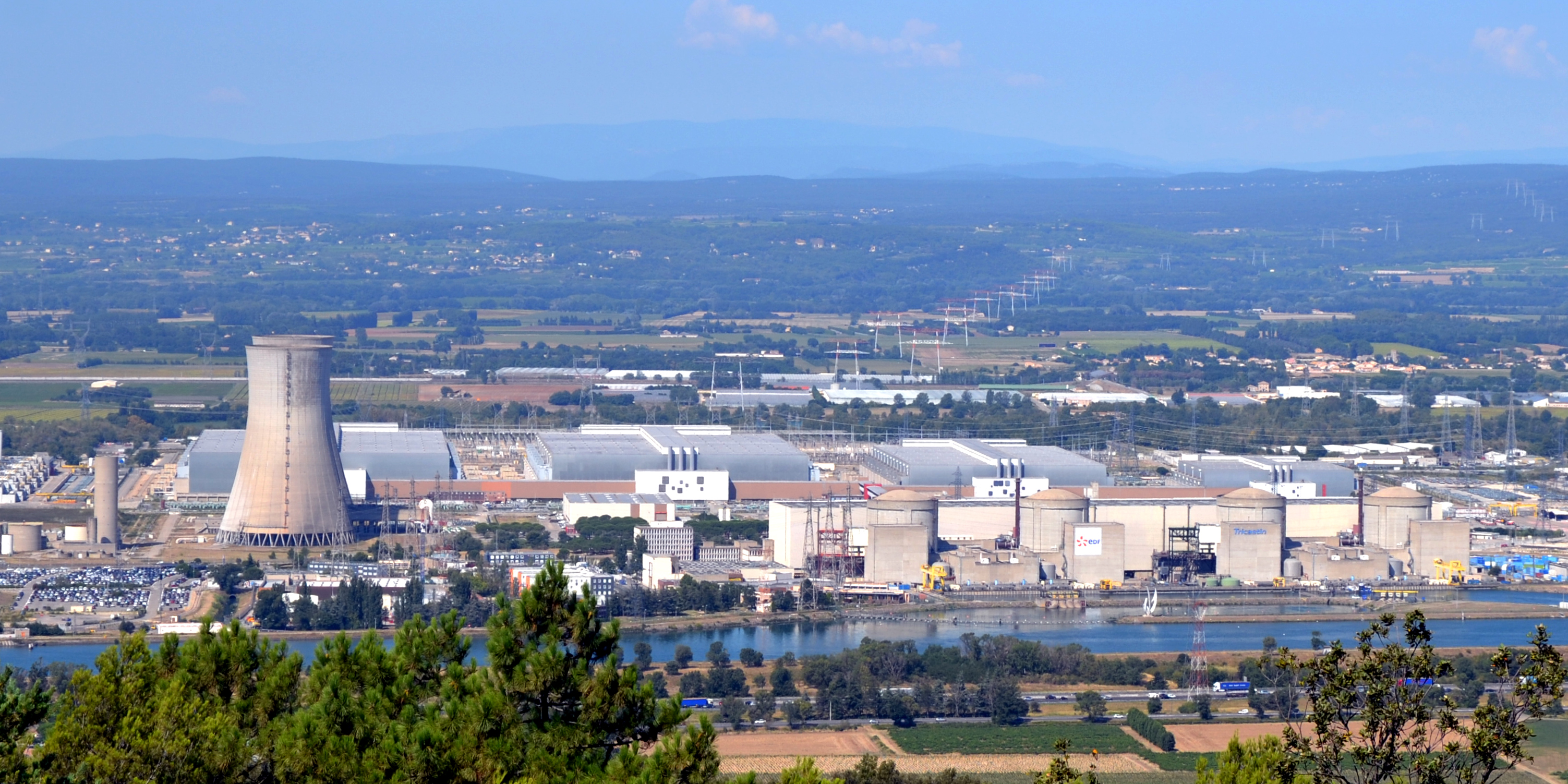
- The containment structures of the Tricastin NPC
- Official name: Centrale nucléaire du Tricastin
- Country: France
- Location: Saint-Paul-Trois-Châteaux, Pierrelatte, Bollène, and Lapalud
- Coordinates: 44°19′47″N 4°43′56″E
- Status: Operational
- Construction began: Unit 1: 1 November 1974; Unit 2: 1 December 1974; Unit 3: 1 April 1975; Unit 4: 1 May 1975
- Commission date: Units 1–2: 1 December 1980; Unit 3: 11 May 1981; Unit 4: 1 November 1981
- Owner: EDF
- Operator: EDF

Nuclear power station
- Reactor type: PWR
- Reactor supplier: Framatome
- Cooling source: Donzère-Mondragon canal (fr:Canal de Donzère-Mondragon)
- Thermal capacity: 4 × 2785 MW_{th}

Power generation
- Units operational: 4 × 915 MW
- Make and model: CP1
- Nameplate capacity: 3660 MW
- Capacity factor: 60.65% (2017); 73.40% (lifetime)
- Annual net output: 19,444 GWh (2017)

External links
- Website: Centrale nucléaire du Tricastin
- Commons: Related media on Commons

The Tricastin Nuclear Power Plant (French: Centrale Nucléaire du Tricastin) is a nuclear power plant consisting of 4 pressurized water reactors (PWRs) of CP1 type with 915 MW electrical power output each. The power plant is located in the south of France (Drôme and Vaucluse Department) at the Canal de Donzère-Mondragon near the Donzère-Mondragon Dam and the commune Pierrelatte.

The power plant is part of the widespread Tricastin Nuclear Site (see below), which was named after the historic Tricastin region. Three out of the four reactors on the site had been used until 2012 to power the Eurodif Uranium enrichment plant, which had been located on the site.

== Tricastin Nuclear Site ==
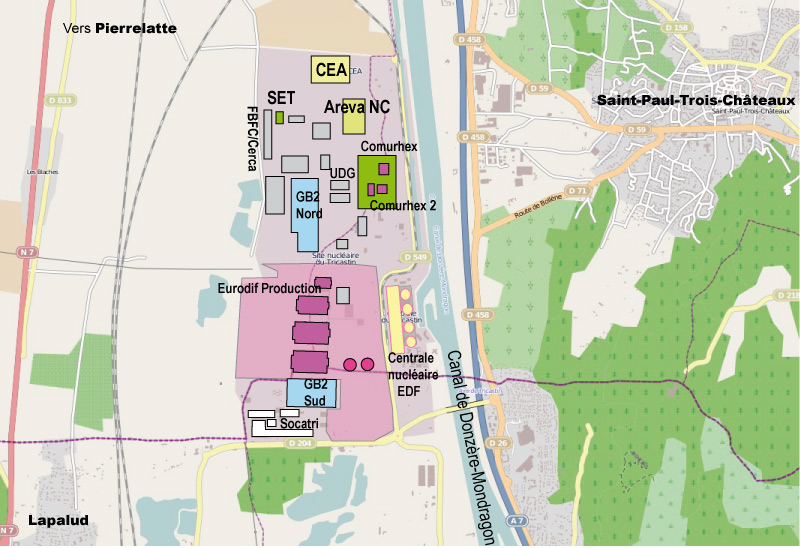
Overview of the facilities on the Tricastin Nuclear Site.

The Tricastin Nuclear Site (Site Nucléaire du Tricastin) is a collection of facilities run by Areva and EDF located on right bank of the Channel of Donzère-Mondragon (diversion canal of the Rhône River) south of the city of Valence (70 km upstream) and north of Avignon (65 km downstream). The site straddles the border between the departments Drôme (26) and Vaucluse (84), not far from the Gard (30) and Ardèche (07) departments, and lies near the communes of Saint-Paul-Trois-Châteaux, Pierrelatte (both Drôme department), Bollène and Lapalud (both Vaucluse Department).

Tricastin is one of the most important nuclear technology sites in the world, along with the COGEMA La Hague site. It is spread out over 600 hectares with over 5000 employees. Some of the involved companies are:

- Commissariat à l'énergie atomique (CEA) de Pierrelatte (A nuclear weapons research facility)
- The EDF Nuclear Power Plant Tricastin (3,660 MWe total 915 MWe each)
- Comurhex: A Uranium hexafluoride conversion facility
- Eurodif: Georges Besse plant for gaseous diffusion uranium enrichment, which operated from 1979 to 2012, replaced by the George Besse II plant for gas centrifuge enrichment with a capacity of 7.5M SWU per year

A small number of facilities in Pierrelatte belong to the Marcoule Nuclear Site.

== Nuclear power plant ==
The site houses 4 pressurized water reactors (PWR) of 915 MW each, which were built mostly in the 1970s and brought online in the early 80s. These reactors produce about 25 TWh/year, or 6% of France's electricity. Three out of four reactors were used for powering the Eurodif Uranium enrichment factory until 2012, the year that Eurodif was closed. The close proximity of the power source and usage of the power allowed for smaller transmission losses to occur, which was done at 225 kV. The replacement of the Eurodif gas-diffusion plant by the new SET gas-centrifuge plant (also located at the Tricastin site) reduced the energy consumption of the uranium enrichment process by a factor of 50, freeing up approximately 2700 MWe for the French national grid.

Spent fuel is transported by train to the reprocessing plant, just as the new fuel is transported to the plant by train.

== Safety ==
=== Fire response ===
Tests on 2 July 2004 by the Autorité de sûreté nucléaire (Nuclear Safety Authority) found that it would take 37 minutes to respond to a fire.

=== Flood ===
In its initial report following the 1999 Blayais Nuclear Power Plant flood, the Institute for Nuclear Protection and Safety (now part of the Radioprotection and Nuclear Safety Institute) called for the risk of flooding at Tricastin to be re-examined due to the presence of the canal.

From 27 September 2017 to December 2017 the reactors were temporary shutdown while repairs to the canal embankment were made. The regulator Autorité de sûreté nucléaire (ASN) had ordered the temporary shutdown because of the risk of embankment failure in the event of an earthquake.

== Incidents ==
=== Cooling water ===
During the 2003 European heat wave from 12 to 22 July, the maximum temperature of 27 °C from the piping of waste heat water into the canal was exceeded on several occasions, totalling about 44 hours.

=== Uranium solution release ===
In July 2008, 18,000 litres (4,755 gallons) of uranium solution containing natural uranium were accidentally released on the Tricastin Nuclear Site. Due to cleaning and repair work the containment system for a uranium solution holding tank was not functional when the tank filled. The inflow exceeded the tank's capacity and 30 cubic metres of uranium solution leaked with 18 cubic metres spilled to the ground. Testing found elevated uranium levels in the nearby rivers Gaffière and Lauzon. The liquid that escaped to the ground contained about 75 kg of unenriched uranium which is toxic as a heavy metal while possessing only slight radioactivity. Estimates for the releases were initially higher, up to 360 kg of natural uranium, but lowered later. Ground and surface water tests indicated that levels of radioactivity were 5% higher than the maximum rate allowed. In the near vicinity and above ground, the local watchdog group CRIIRAD has detected unusually high levels of radiation.

French authorities banned the use of water from the Gaffière and Lauzon for drinking and watering of crops. Swimming, water sports and fishing were also banned. This incident has been classified as Level 1 on the International Nuclear Event Scale.

In July 2008, approximately 100 employees were exposed to radioactive particles that escaped from a pipe in a reactor that had been shut down. Additionally, a nuclear waste leak that apparently had remained undiscovered since 2005 spilled into a concrete protective shell in Romans-sur-Isere. Areva, who owns the site, ensured that the leak had not caused harm to the environment, but the issue sparked discussion about an old French army terrain, where nuclear waste was deposited in shielded dumps. The layer of dirt covering the waste is reported to have been thinned due to wind and rain erosion, directly exposing nuclear waste material to open air. Also, the speed with which the Tricastin incident was reported to the Autorité de sûreté nucléaire (8 hours) and subsequently to local authorities (another 6 hours) is subject of ongoing discussions. The European Commissioner Andris Piebalgs may send inspectors to the sites to investigate recent events further.

Other implications following the incidents resulted in a drop in the sale of wines from the Tricastin area. Acting on the wishes of the wine growers to change the name of the appellation to something without "Tricastin", to avoid being associated with the nuclear power plant, in June 2010, INAO signalled its intention to allow a name change from Coteaux du Tricastin AOC to Grignan-Les Adhemar effective from the 2010 vintage.

== EPR project ==
On 15 February 2007 the Le Soir newspaper announced that Suez was considering building a new European Pressurized Reactor at the Tricastin site, but the claim was denied by the SUEZ group.

== Naming ==
The Tricastin region where the plant is located, is named after the ancient Ligurian tribe the Tricastini. Their capital Augusta Tricastinorum was mentioned by Pliny the Elder in his Natural History book III in 74 C.E.

== Photo gallery ==
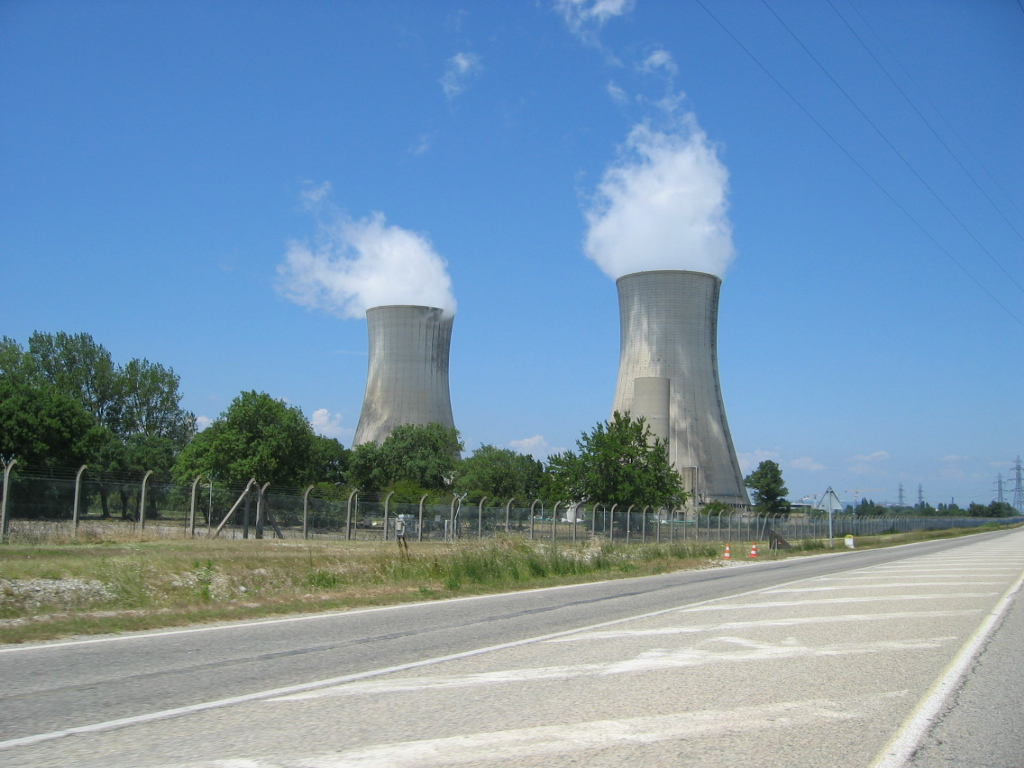
The cooling towers of Eurodif

A single cooling tower

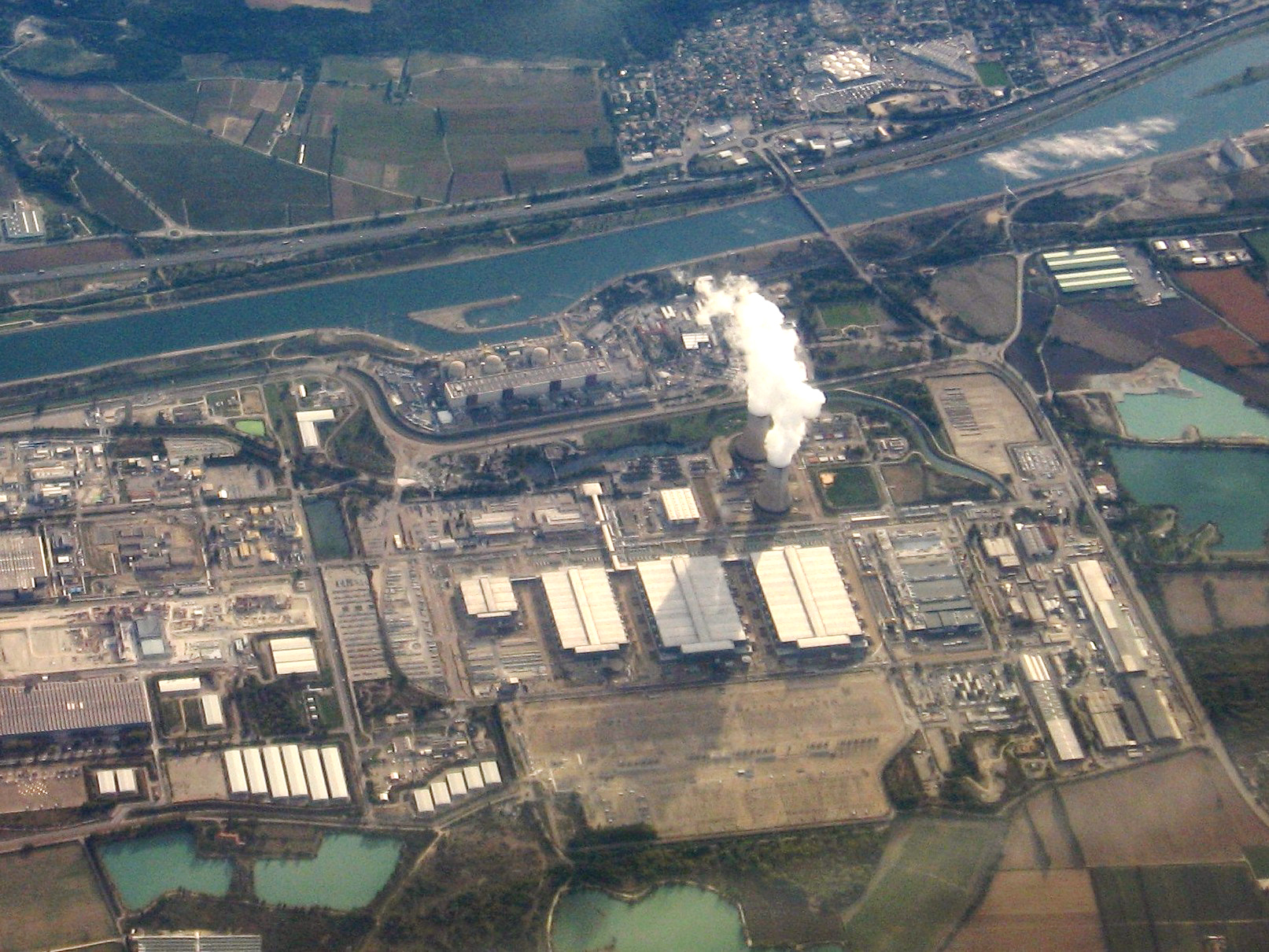
Aerial view
