= Dampierre Nuclear Power Plant =

Nuclear power plant in France

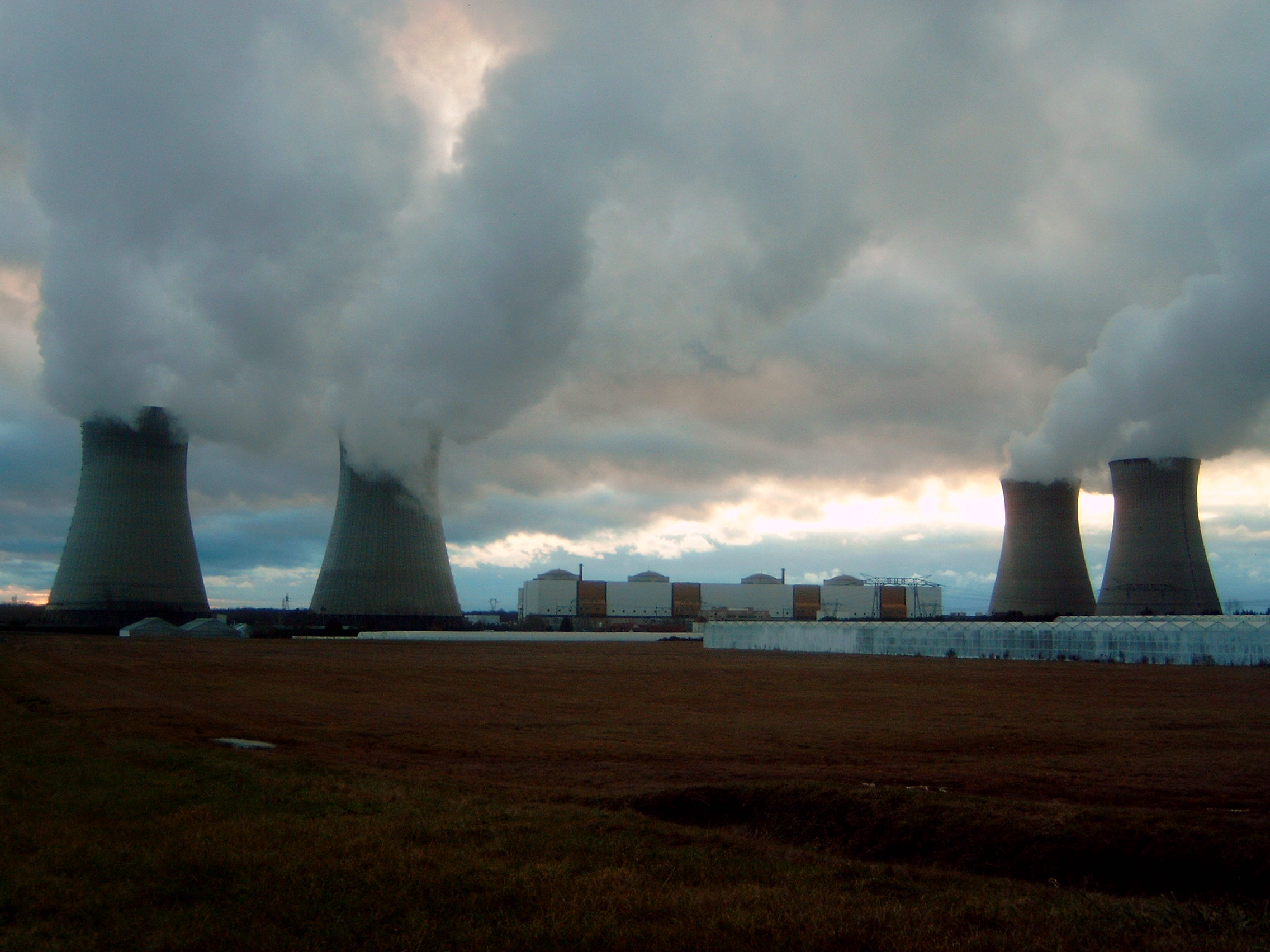
- The Dampierre NPP
- Country: France
- Coordinates: 47°43′59″N 2°31′0″E
- Status: Operational
- Construction began: 1974
- Commission date: 23 March 1980; 46 years ago
- Owner: EDF
- Operator: EDF
- Site elevation: 120 m (390 ft)

Power generation
- Units operational: 4 x 937 MW
- Nameplate capacity: 3748 MW
- Capacity factor: 75.0%
- Annual net output: 24,629 GW·h

External links
- Website: Official website
- Commons: Related media on Commons

The Dampierre nuclear power plant is located in the town of Dampierre-en-Burly (Loiret), 55 km upstream of Orleans and 110 km downstream of Nevers, it uses water from the Loire for cooling.

Approximately 1,100 people work at the site.

== Seismic risk ==
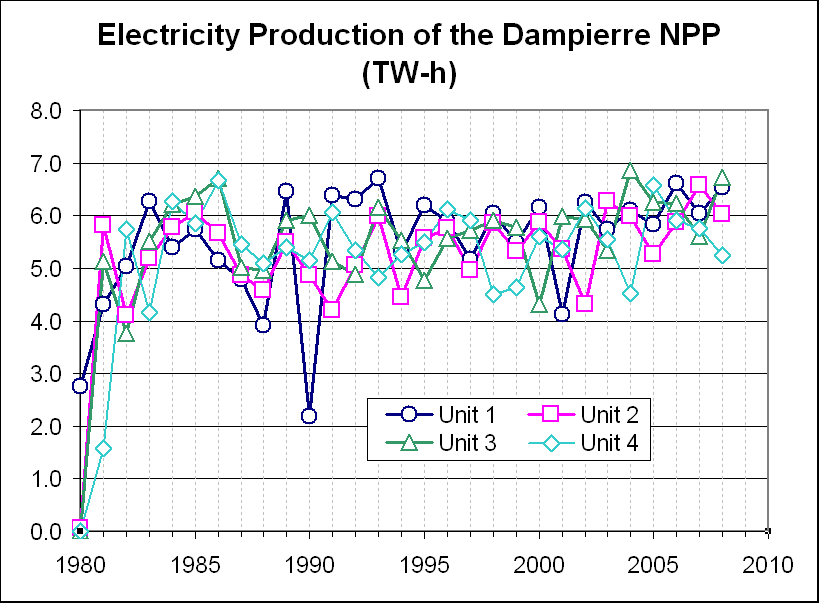
Electricity Production Performance

According to a report by the Nuclear Safety Authority in October 2002, certain functions providing backup cooling for the reactor could not be ensured in the event of an earthquake.

== Incidents ==
On 2 April 2001, during a refueling outage of unit 4, an operator made a mistake in following the correct loading pattern for the different fuel rod assemblies (of which 30% were MOX fuel). The reloading operation was stopped and the core completely unloaded. The incident was initially classified at Level 1 of the INES scale, but reclassified as Level 2 by France's nuclear safety authority in 2007.

On the night of 9 to 10 April 2007, reactor No. 3 went on emergency standby and remained so throughout the night; it was supplied with emergency power by an emergency generator. EDF triggered an emergency plan to 22h10. Throughout the night, teams acted in emergency mode, the reactor No. 3 having been deprived of its external power. The emergency generator worked well. The ASN has established a national crisis with the support of the IRSN. EDF and DSC lifted the crisis the following morning at 8:15. Following this incident, the No. 3 reactor remained shut down for several weeks to correct the problem.
