= Tricastin =

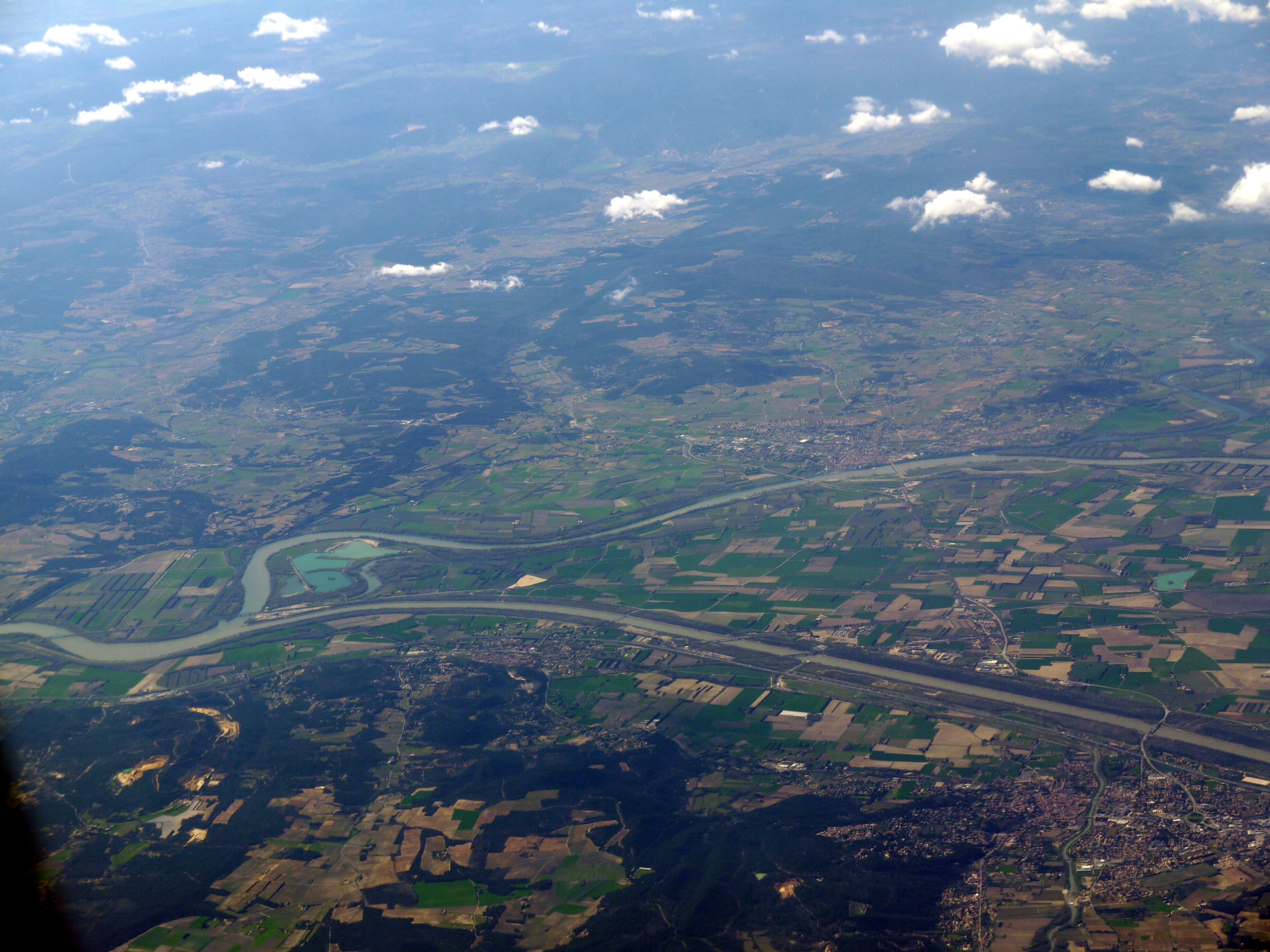
View of the Rhône valley and the Tricastin

The Tricastin (French pronunciation: [tʁikastɛ̃]) is a natural and historic region in the southern Rhône valley of southeastern France comprising the southwestern portion of the Drôme department and the northwestern portion of Vaucluse and centered on the modern town of Saint-Paul-Trois-Châteaux.

The region is the cradle of the ancient Tricastini tribe, whose capital was Augusta Tricastinorum under Augustus's reign, now Saint-Paul-Trois-Châteaux. The name Tricastini, which for a long time was interpreted as meaning "the land of the Three Castles" in reality derives its name from the Gallic tribe the 'Tricastini', which occupied the territory during the Roman period.

Nowadays, the Tricastin region is known as the site of the Tricastin Nuclear Power Plant situated on the Donzère-Mondragon canal, a tributary of the Rhône, for its Rhône valley AOC wine grape Grignan-Les Adhemar, and for its natural and architectural endowment.

== History ==
The Tricastini were an ancient Gallic tribe that gave its name to the region. Pliny the Elder spoke of their capital named Augusta Tricastinorum in Natural History, Book 3, corresponding to modern Saint-Paul-Trois-Châteaux.

Tricastin was considered as the "land of white stone" due to the fact that it is one of the only areas of the Rhône valley where the stone has such a light color. Numerous quarries were active up to the middle of the 20th century in Saint-Paul-Trois-Châteaux and Saint-Restitut.

The capital Saint-Paul-Trois-Châteaux was the seat of a bishopric until the French Revolution when it was dissolved, the same fate as those of Uzès and Vaison-la-Romaine. The southern Tricastin town of Bollène was a commercial center during the whole medieval era and its center still contains traces of its flourishing past. Pont-Saint-Esprit and Bourg-Saint-Andéol, located on the western border, are also very old settlements where the mark left by religious influence is still very evident. They remained pilgrimage sites throughout the medieval era up until the French Revolution, and house numerous religious communities today.

In modern times, the 20th century saw vast improvements in the transportation infrastructure. More recently, the Tricastin nuclear power plant has attracted protests by anti-nuclear groups such as Greenpeace.

== Environment ==
=== Geography ===
Located in the southern Rhône valley, the Tricastin plain extends from the Donzère canal (bordered by the autoroute of the South) on one side, and by the ancient riverbed of the Rhône on the other. To the north, it extends to the narrows at the Pont du Robinet bridge, and to the south, to the Mondragon cliffs.

=== Climate ===
The area straddles the Mediterranean and the continental climatic regions where in this part of France the climatic transition is rapid, winter snow being frequent in Montélimar but rare some 20 - 30 kilometers further south. In this transitional area that constitutes the northern limit of Provence, the climate in Saint-Paul is more typically Mediterranean than the slightly cooler areas dominated by Lance Mountain in the Drôme provençal.

The Tricastin has a climate which is mostly Mediterranean augmented by the mistral in winter, and a marked increase in aridity in summer. Winters are generally milder than in the northern part of the Drôme and in the Ardèche but cooler than in Provence where the difference is two to three degrees Celsius on average. Temperatures can thus be very hot in summer and the downpours brutal, the Tricastin valley being located as it is between the Cévennes Piedmont (in the Gard and Ardèche departments) and the town of Nyons in the Baronnies (Drôme and Vaucluse).

== Economy ==
=== Agriculture ===
==== Wine ====
This is a wine-growing region. The wine Coteaux du Tricastin AOC is produced in the area, was classed VDQS in 1964 and achieved AOC status on 27 July 1973.

==== Mushrooms ====
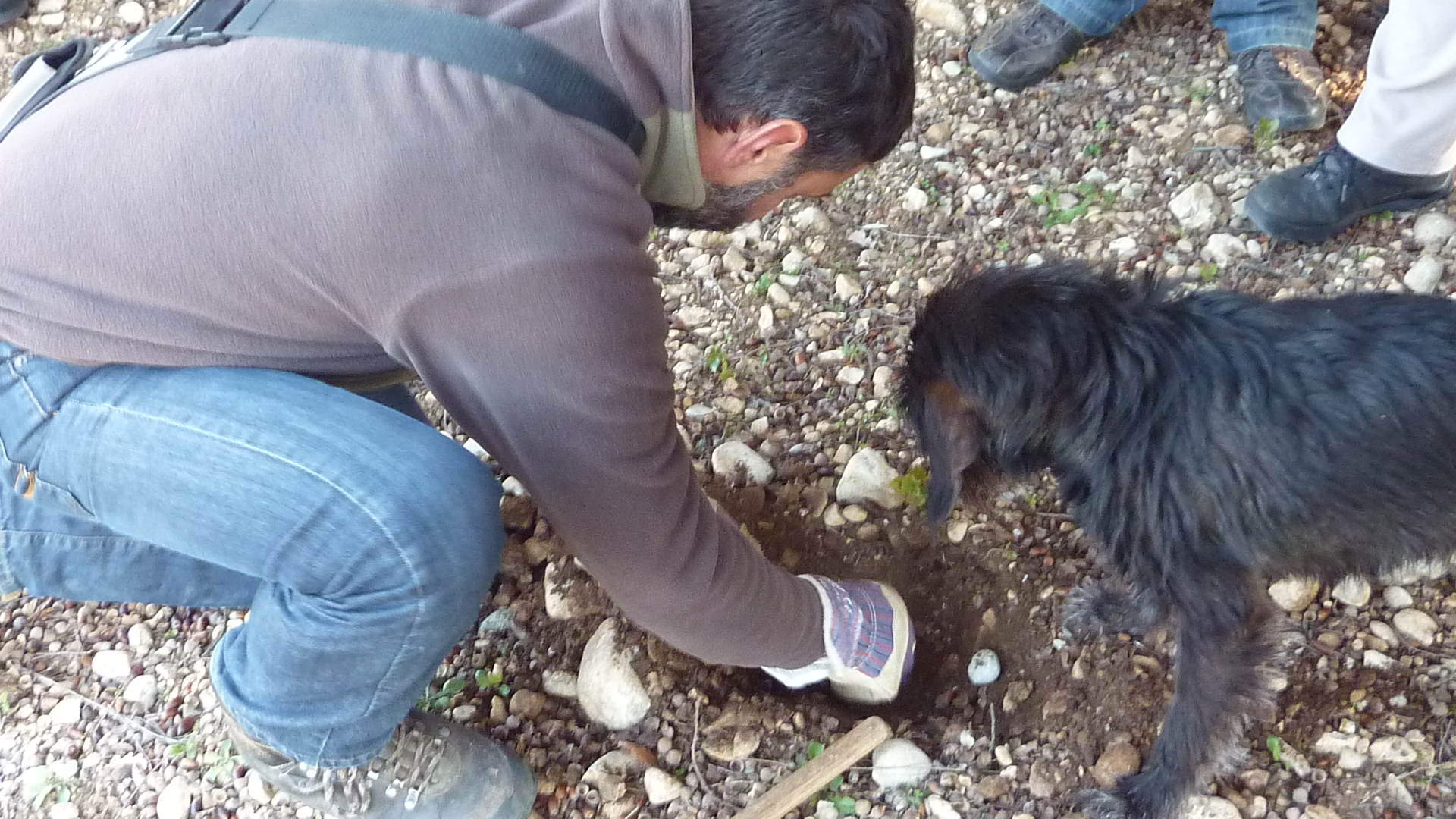
Mushroom hunter and his dog

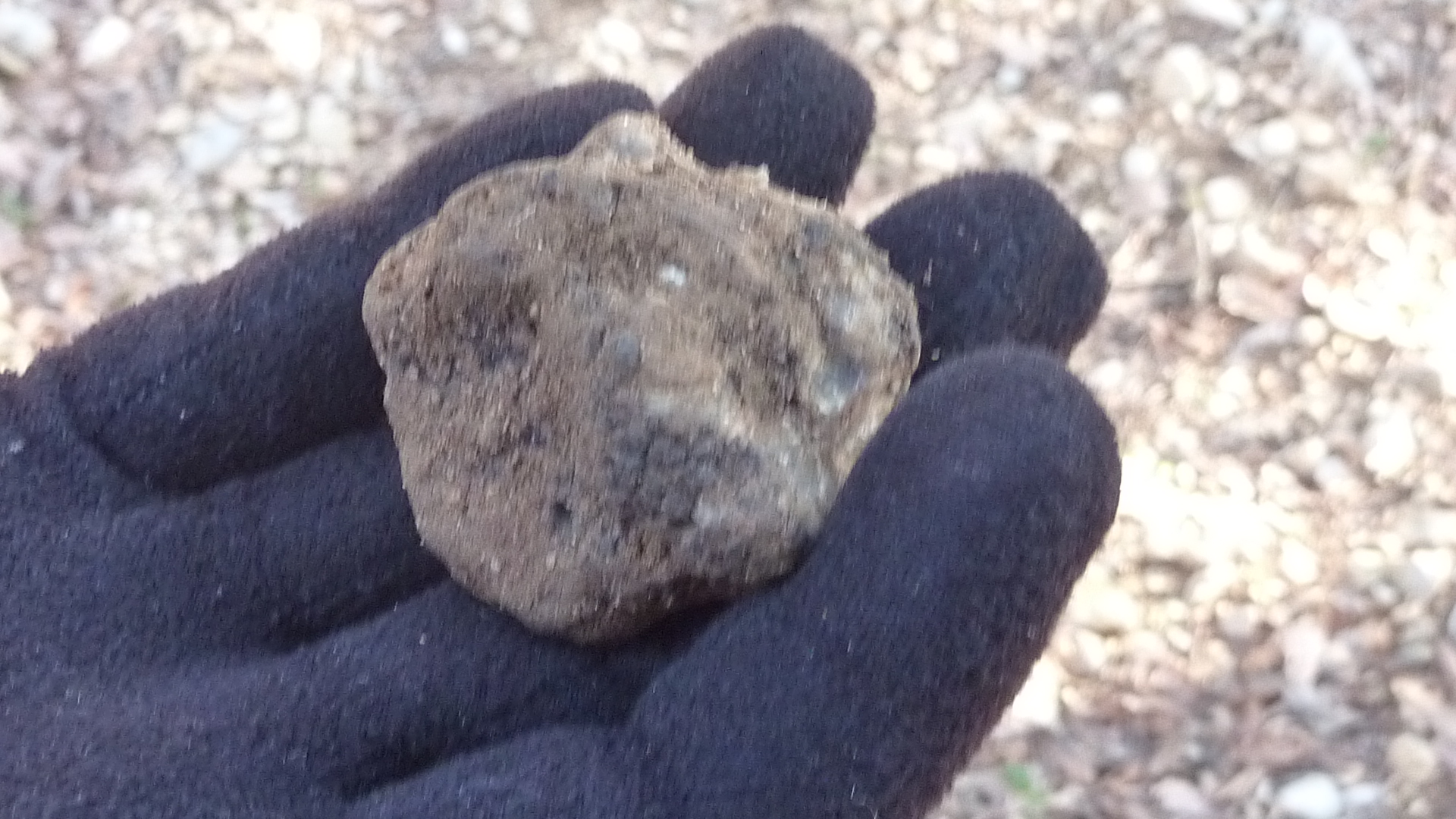
Tuber melanosporum, the French black truffle

The Tricastin truffle is protected by AOC certification since 1978, it ranges over 68 communes in the Drôme and 15 communes in the Vaucluse. In order to meet the AOC designation, the Tricastin truffle requires sterilization during the first boil and only with T. melanosporum.

In this region, as in others, truffle growers got together and formed professional associations such as the Drôme des Collines or the Syndicat général de la truffe noire du Tricastin with headquarters at the Maison de la Truffe et du Tricastin in Saint Paul Trois Châteaux.

=== Energy ===
The Tricastin nuclear power plant, situated in the heart of the Tricastin valley since 1974, is a pressurized water reactor and one of the most important nuclear plants in France. It straddles the communes of Saint-Paul-Trois-Chateaux, Bollène, Lapalud and Pierrelatte. It is the chief industrial plant in the Tricastin valley area and supplies the energy needs for the departments of Ardèche, Drôme, Vaucluse and the Gard.

The Donzère-Mondragon dam, a major development in French industrial history, is located on the Donzère-Mondragon canal.

=== Tourism ===
Significantly improved by construction during the 20th century, the Tricastin valley is criss-crossed by Route nationale 7 (RN7), freeway A7, the TGV Méditerranée high-speed train, and a dense network of departmental roads, and by the Donzère-Mondragon canal.

The Tricastin valley is dotted with towns full of history and having a rich heritage. Some highlights:

- Saint-Paul-Trois-Châteaux - medieval cathedral, ancient neighborhoods, ramparts, private homes dating back to the 15th century, museum of archaeology, House of Truffles and Wine
- Bollène - 11th century, Collégiale Saint Martin, Convent of the Holy Sacrament, old quarters, private villas dating to the 16th century, ramparts, cave dwellings of Barry, Notre Dame du Pont chapel
- Bourg-Saint Andéol - Bishop's Palace, Romanesque church, private villas dating back to the 15th century, multiple chapels, Convent of the Presentation of Mary, statue of Diane Huntress, banks of the Rhône, hospital with baroque cloister and chapel, gothic tower
- Donzère - old quarters, ramparts, ruins of château and ramparts, private villas, Robinet suspension bridge, Donzère parade
- Grignan - a Renaissance Château, old quarters, 15th-century Collégiale Saint Sauveur, ramparts, private villas
- La Garde-Adhémar - romanesque Church of Saint Michel, Chapel of the Penitents, old village, Valley of the Nymphs, romanesque Chapel of Valley of the Nymphs, botanic gardens
- Pierrelatte - old center, 19th-century church, 19th-century belfry, private villas in town and on the plain
- Pont-Saint-Esprit - medieval bridge, old quarters, Museum of Sacred Art, Paul Raymond Museum, Saint Saturnin Church, Barracks of the King, Circular Boulevard, neo-Gothic stairs on the banks of the Rhône, Citadel
