= Dominique Lorentz =

French journalist

Dominique Lorentz is a French investigative journalist who has written books on the stakes and reality of nuclear proliferation, as well as a film documentary, La République Atomique ("The Atomic Republic"), which related terrorist acts in France in the 1980s to the nuclear program of Iran.

Her work details various types of state cooperation (economic, technological, military and diplomatic) over the years, and a systematic analysis of foreign leaders' and analysts' speeches and writings. She mainly analyze open sources (newspaper, specialized reviews, official reports, news agencies' cables, biographies, etc.) in order to put facts in perspective and retrace the thread of the history of nuclear proliferation. Lorentz demonstrates that proliferation is not mainly the work of isolated individuals, but is an explicit result of the geopolitical strategy of various governments. She shows that after World War II, when the United States considered it too dangerous to directly help other countries in developing nuclear technology (which was thought as a deterrent to any Soviet offensive), it charged France with the job. Thus, France helped other countries in developing nuclear technology, starting with Israel. This, according to Lorentz, explains how 44 states today have the capacity of developing weapons of mass destruction.

== Eurodif and Iran's nuclear program ==
One of the important points of her investigation concerns the link between the Eurodif (European Gaseous Diffusion Uranium Enrichment Consortium) affair and a series of terrorist acts in France. Eurodif is a joint stock company created in the 1970s, involved in uranium enrichment, in which Iran had a 10% share. According to Dominique Lorentz, the (mainly) French-Iranian civil nuclear partnership, started in 1974, dissimulated a military aspect which was supposed to help Iran acquire the atomic bomb through its investment which guaranteed Tehran enriched uranium supply.

However, after the 1979 Iranian revolution, France ended this cooperation program and blocked Iran's investment. Following this perspective, 1985 and 1986 events such as the French hostage affair in Lebanon; bombings in Paris (in the FNAC store at the Hôtel de Ville and at Pub Renault); the 17 November 1986 assassination of Georges Besse (one of the most important responsible of the French nuclear program, who finally became Eurodif's leader) and the February 1987 death of Michel Baroin, president of the GMF (Garantie Mutuelle des Fonctionnaires) in a plane crash, were all allegedly part of a terrorist Iranian campaign to blackmail France in order to recover its debt from the Eurodif's investment. The first French payment back to Iran of 330 million dollars was done on the same day that Georges Besse was murdered, and the second one in December 1987, after Michel Baroin's death.

On 5 May 1988 the last French hostages from Lebanon arrived in Paris. The first ones had been taken hostage in spring of 1985. The next day, Matignon published an accord signed by French premier Jacques Chirac and his Iranian counterpart. Against the return of the last hostages, Paris agreed to accept Tehran back in its share-holder status of Eurodif and to deliver it enriched uranium "without restrictions".

On 3 February 1989 Roland Dumas, minister of Foreign Affairs, officially visited Tehran. In September 1989, president François Mitterrand charged François Scheer of negotiating an accord putting a definitive end to the Eurodif disagreement. On 29 December 1991 this secret accord was signed by president Mitterrand, definitively reestablishing Iran in its Eurodif's share-holder rights, notably of the right to perceive 10% of the enriched uranium. During this ten-years crisis, Iran acquired various nuclear installations (reactors, equipment to enrich uranium, etc.) from states such as Germany, Argentina, China or Pakistan.

On 8 January 1995 Russia signed a nuclear cooperation treaty with Iran, concerning in particular the Bushehr Nuclear Power Facility. Two years later, France signed an accord to deliver enriched uranium to Russia, while the Russian cooperation with Iran was being enforced.

== Bibliography ==
- Une guerre (June 1997) (about the Eurodif affair, the French hostage affair and the murder of Georges Besse and Michel Baroin) ISBN 2-912485-00-2
- Affaires Atomiques (February 2001) (why 44 countries have the capacity to create a nuclear bomb) ISBN 2-912485-22-3
- Secret Atomiques (March 2002) ISBN 2-912485-41-X

== Film documentary ==
- Lorentz, Dominique and Carr-Brown, David, La République atomique ("The Atomic Republic"), broadcast on 14 November 2001 on Arte TV, about Tehran's blackmail to Paris in the 1980s. On-line

== See also ==
- Nuclear program of Iran
- Nuclear proliferation
