= Agnès Callamard =

French human rights activist (born 1963)

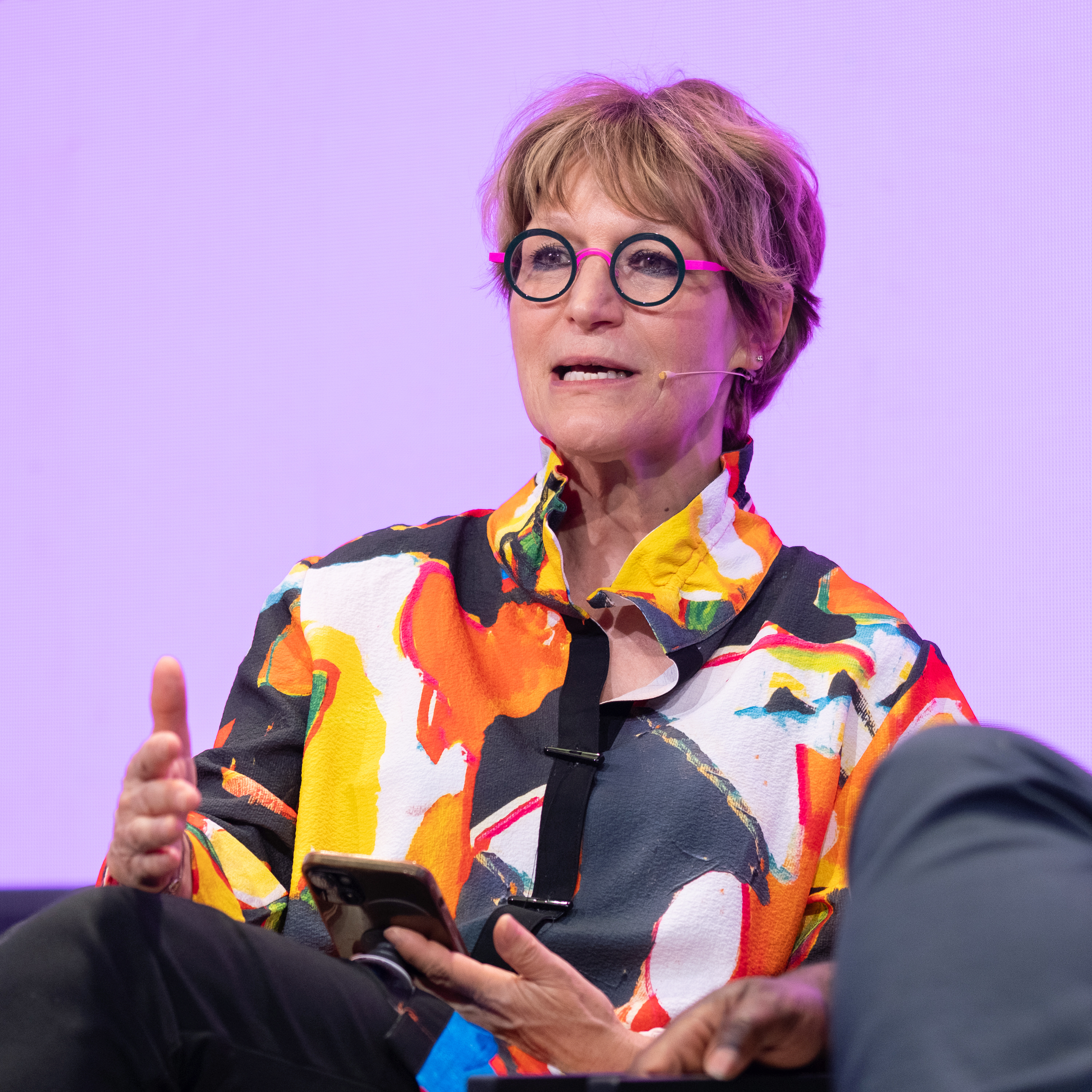
- Callamard at SXSW London 2026
- Born: 14 March 1963 (age 63); Pierrelatte, France
- Education: Grenoble Institute of Political Studies (BA); Howard University (MA); New School for Social Research (PhD)
- Occupations: Human rights activist and scholar
- Years active: 1995–present
- Employer: Office of the United Nations High Commissioner for Human Rights (OHCHR)
- Organisation: Amnesty International

Agnès Paulette Solange Callamard (French pronunciation: [aɲɛs kalamaʁ]; born 14 March 1963) is a French human rights activist who is the Secretary General of Amnesty International. She was previously the Special Rapporteur on extrajudicial, summary, or arbitrary executions appointed by the United Nations Human Rights Council, and the former director of the Columbia University Global Freedom of Expression project.

== Early life and education ==
A native of Pierrelatte, France, Callamard received her undergraduate degree from the Institut d'Études Politiques de Grenoble in 1985. She earned a master's degree in international and African studies from Howard University in 1988. Callamard received a PhD in Political Science from the New School for Social Research in New York City, with a thesis titled "Populations Under Fire, Population Under Stress: A Study of Mozambican Refugees and Malawian villagers in Malawi" in 1995.

== Career ==
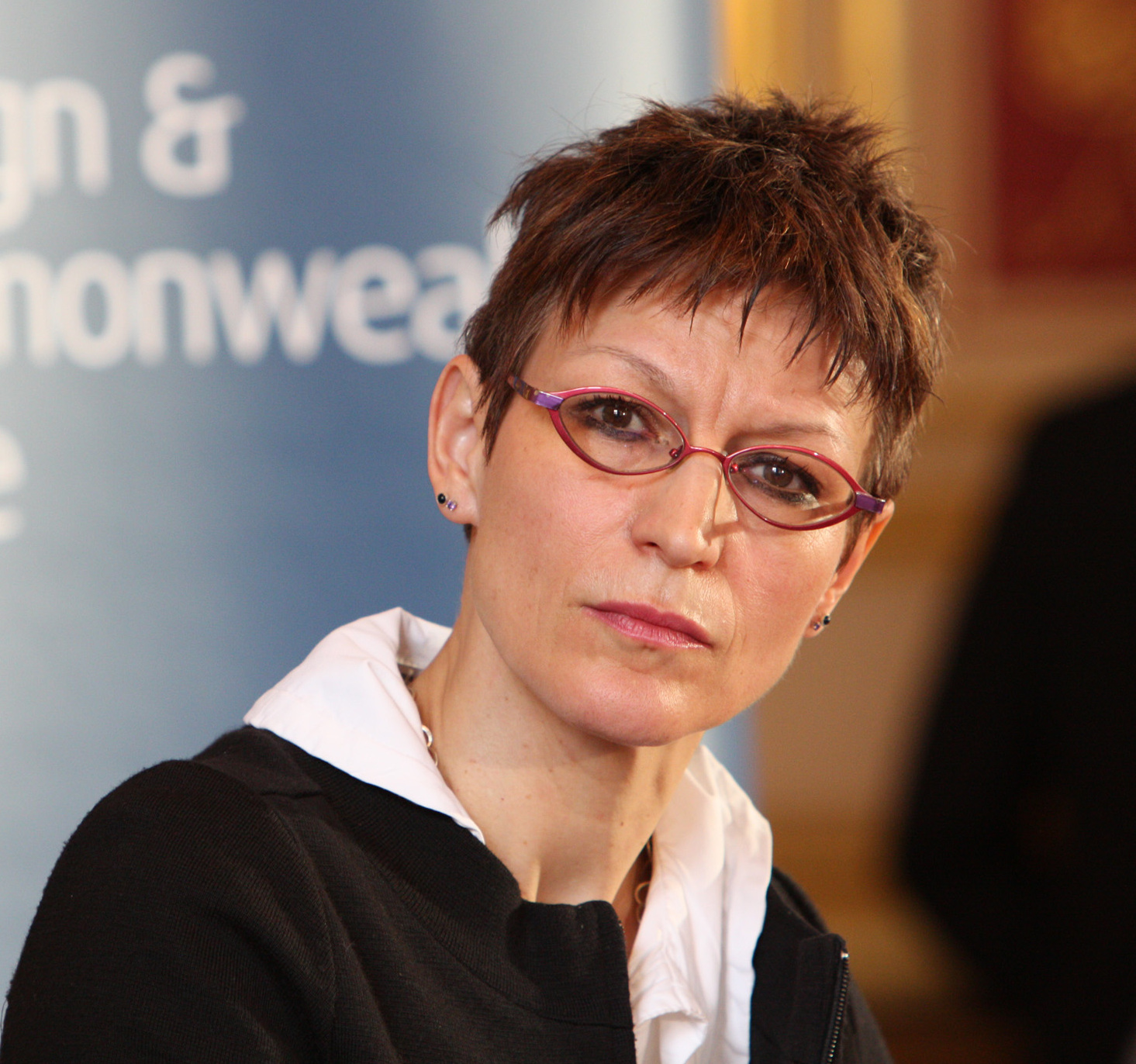
Callamard in 2011

Callamard has conducted human-rights investigations in a number of countries in Africa, Asia, and the Middle East. She has published in the field of human rights, women's rights, refugee movements and accountability. Callamard has worked extensively in the field of international refugee movements, including work with the Center for Refugee Studies in Toronto.

In May 2017, Callamard attended a conference in the Philippines, which was followed by her Wikipedia page being vandalized. Callamard stated that the visit was not in an official capacity.

=== Amnesty International ===
From 1998 to 2001, Callamard was Chef de Cabinet for the Secretary General of Amnesty International and the organisation's Research Policy Coordinator.

In January 2013, Callamard tweeted that Israel was responsible for the death of Yasser Arafat. In April 2021, Amnesty International released a statement that the tweet was “written in haste and is incorrect," and did not reflect of the position of Amnesty or Callamard. Jewish News wrote "[t]he tweet was still available on Callamard's account".

=== Other work ===
In 2001, Callamard was the founding director of the Humanitarian Accountability Partnership International, where she oversaw field trials in Afghanistan, Cambodia and Sierra Leone and created an international self-regulatory body for humanitarian agencies committed to strengthening accountability to disaster-affected populations. She was in this position until 2004.

In October 2004, Callamard took the position of Executive Director of Article 19, an international human-rights organization.

In November 2013, Callamard was appointed Director of Columbia University's Global Freedom of Expression initiative.

In 2016 she was nominated by France to become the fourth OSCE Special Representative on Freedom of the Media. Despite being a popular choice to replace Dunja Mijatović her nomination was strongly opposed by Russia and other eastern European countries.

=== United Nations ===
Callamard was the United Nations Special Rapporteur on extrajudicial, summary or arbitrary executions, appointed by the UN Human Rights Council resolution A/HRC/RES/35/15 of 22 June 2017 for a 3 years mandate and finishing on 31 March 2021. In 2019 she led the human rights inquiry into the assassination of Saudi journalist Jamal Khashoggi. Her findings were presented to the UN Human Rights Council in June 2019. After the report was published, she said that a senior Saudi official twice threatened to have her killed if she was not reined in by the UN.

She concluded that the drone strike on Iranian General Qasem Soleimani was unlawful as part of advance version of her report on "Report of the Special Rapporteur on extrajudicial, summary or arbitrary executions" for the 44th session of the Human Rights Council. Her report stated that the action of the United States violated international law because the US had not provided any evidence that Soleimani was planning an imminent attack against US interests, which would have warranted and justified immediate action.

=== Amnesty International ===
She returned to Amnesty International after twenty years, as Secretary General, in March 2021. She leads the organization's human-rights work and is its chief spokesperson. She is responsible for providing overall leadership of the International Secretariat, including setting the strategic direction for the organisation and managing relations with Amnesty International's national entities.

== Works and publications ==
- Callamard, Agnès (18 March 2009). "Protect the believers, not the belief". The Guardian.
- Callamard, Agnès; Amnesty International Dutch Section; Codesria (2000). Monitoring and Investigating Torture, Cruel, Inhuman or Degrading Treatment, and Prison Conditions (PDF). Dakar: Council for the Development of Social Science Research in Africa. ISBN 978-2-869-78088-0. OCLC 47863459. Archived from the original (PDF) on 2021-01-22.
- Callamard, Agnès (12 August 2015). "Comity for Internet? Recent Court Decisions on the Right to be De-indexed". The National Law Review.
- Callamard, Agnès (23 March 2017). "Are courts re-inventing Internet regulation?". International Review of Law, Computers & Technology. 31 (3): 323–339. doi:10.1080/13600869.2017.1304603. S2CID 152003362.
