= Autorité de sûreté nucléaire et de radioprotection =

French nuclear safety organization

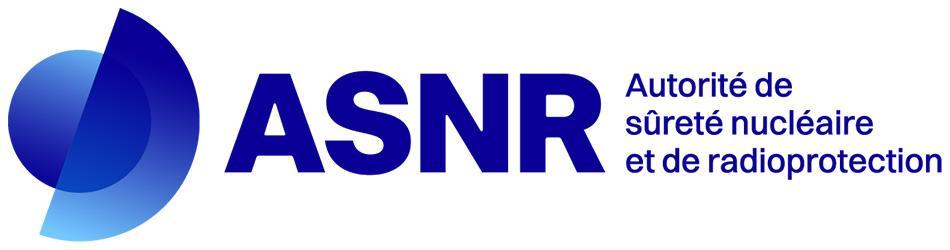

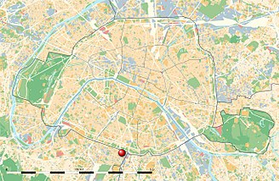
- Abbreviation: ASNR
- Established: January 1, 2025
- Merger of: Autorité de sûreté nucléaire, Institut de radioprotection et de sûreté nucléaire
- Type: Independent administrative authority
- Purpose: Analyses, tests and technical inspections
- Location: Montrouge (Paris metro area), France
- Coordinates: 48.818125°N 2.326827°E
- President: Pierre-Marie Abadie
- Website: www.asnr.fr

The Autorité de sûreté nucléaire et de radioprotection (Nuclear Safety and Radiation Protection Authority, ASNR) is a French independent administrative authority whose mission is the control of nuclear safety and radiological protection in France. It was created January 1, 2025, via the contested merger of the Autorité de sûreté nucléaire (Nuclear Safety Authority, ASN) and the Institut de radioprotection et de sûreté nucléaire (Institute of Radiation Protection and Nuclear Safety, IRSN). Pierre-Marie Abadie was the first president.

== History ==
The merger of the ASN and the IRSN was announced in February 2023 in a context of nuclear renaissance in France and was the subject of strong opposition, marked notably by the opposition of three previous presidents of the Office parlementaire d'évaluation des choix scientifiques et technologiques (Parliamentary Office for the Evaluation of Scientific and Technological Choices) and employees of IRSN, a vote of the National Assembly sanctifying the "dual organization" between ASN and IRSN, and an unfavorable opinion of the Social and Economics Committee of IRSN in December 2024.

The law creating the ASNR was adopted May 20, 2024 and entered into effect January 1, 2025. Pierre-Marie Abadie, president of ASN in November and December 2024, was selected as the first president for a duration of six years.

== Missions ==
The ASNR assures the surveillance and verification of civil nuclear activities in France. It also carries out activities pertaining to research, expert guidance, training, and public information in the areas of nuclear safety and radiation protection.

== Governance ==
The ASNR is directed by a board of five commissioners.

The duration of service is fixed by law at six years, and members cannot serve a second term. The commissioners are required to be impartial and cannot be instructed by the government or any other person or institution. Commissioners serve full-time and cannot be dismissed. Three, including the president of ASNR, are appointed by the president of France, one by the president of the National Assembly, and one by the president of the Senate.

=== Presidency ===
- Pierre-Marie Abadie (since January 1, 2025)

== See also ==
=== Documents ===
- Conseil d'État (22 December 2023). "Avis sur un projet de loi relatif à l'organisation de la gouvernance de la sûreté nucléaire et de la radioprotection pour répondre au défi de la relance de la filière nucléaire" [Opinion on a bill related to the organization of the governance of nuclear safety and radiation protection to respond to the challenge of the relaunch of the nuclear industry] (in French).

=== Related Articles ===
- Nuclear power in France
- Nuclear Regulatory Commission (US equivalent agency)
