= Eurodif =

Nuclear enrichment company in France

Coordinates: 44°19′47″N 4°43′14″E

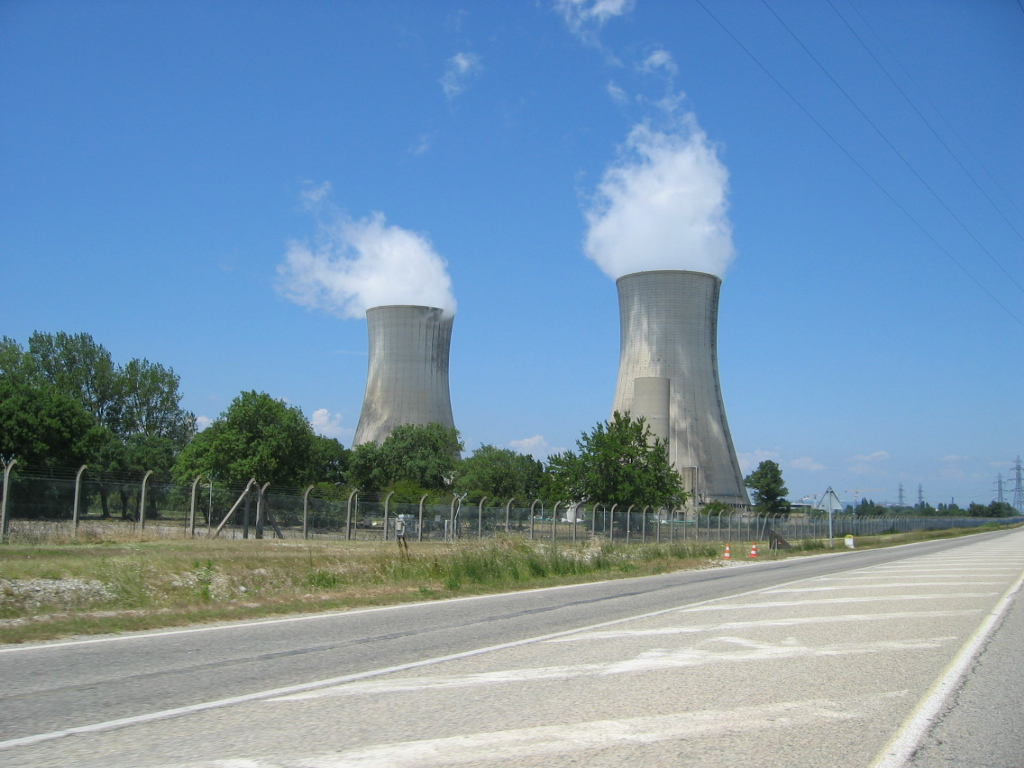
The two cooling towers from Eurodif

Eurodif, which means European Gaseous Diffusion Uranium Enrichment Consortium, is a subsidiary of the French company Orano, which operates a uranium enrichment plant, called the Georges-Besse plant, established at the Tricastin Nuclear Power Center in Pierrelatte in Drôme. The nuclear site of Pierrelatte includes many nuclear installations, of which the largest are the Eurodif fuel factory and the Tricastin nuclear power station.

Enriched uranium is the preferred fuel for light water reactors, a common nuclear power technology.

== History ==
In 1973 France, Belgium, Italy, Spain and Sweden formed the joint stock company EURODIF. Sweden withdrew from the project in 1974. In 1975 Sweden's 10 per cent share in EURODIF was transferred to Iran as a result of an arrangement between France and Iran. The French government subsidiary company Cogema and the Iranian Government established the Sofidif (Société franco–iranienne pour l'enrichissement de l'uranium par diffusion gazeuse) enterprise with 60 per cent and 40 per cent shares, respectively. In turn, Sofidif acquired a 25 per cent share in EURODIF, through which Iran attained its 10 per cent share of EURODIF.

In 1974, the Mohammad Reza Shah Pahlavi, Shah of Iran, lent $1 billion (and another $180 million in 1977) for the construction of the factory, in order to have the right to buy 10% of the production. Iran remains a shareholder of Eurodif via Sofidif. The Franco-Iranian consortium shareholder still owns 25% of Eurodif.

The Georges-Besse plant, named after Georges Besse, its founder, provides uranium to forty producers of nuclear electricity, including EDF, France's largest electric power company.

Naturally occurring uranium contains 0.7% of uranium 235. It can be enriched up to 5% by a gas diffusion process using uranium hexafluoride (UF_{6}). France decided to abandon the gas diffusion process used by the Eurodif Georges Besse I factory for a modern centrifuge process. The project announced by Areva NC to make the change was the subject of a public discussion in the Rhône-Alpes region from September 1 to October 22, 2004. The advantage of the new process is that it is more energy efficient: Georges Besse I used the power generated by all three (2,700 MW) of Tricastin's nuclear reactors for uranium enrichment, whereas the new centrifuge-based Georges Besse II plant can make similar amounts of uranium with only 50 MW.

Dismantling the original Eurodif facility is planned to be completed by the end of 2020.
