= Donzère-Mondragon Dam =

Dam in Provence-Alpes-Côte d'Azur, France

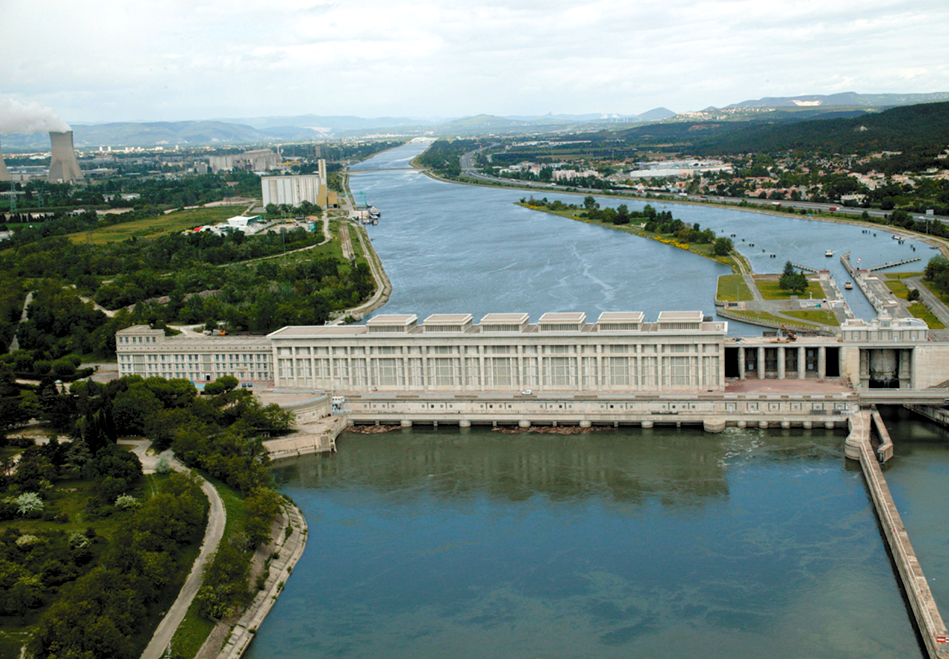

- Location within France
- Country: France
- Location: Bollène, Vaucluse
- Coordinates: 44°18′13.18″N 4°44′33.12″E
- Purpose: Power
- Construction began: 1947
- Opening date: 1952

Power Station
- Commission date: 1952
- Turbines: 6 x 59 MW Kaplan-type
- Installed capacity: 354 MW
- Annual generation: 2,100 GWh

The Donzère-Mondragon Dam (or André-Blondel dam), located in the French commune of Bollène-Écluse is a hydroelectric dam and lock built in 1952 at the southern end of the Donzère-Mondragon canal, in the Vaucluse department in France. It was registered in the list of historic monuments in France in 1992.

== History ==
This hydroelectric dam is in the French commune of Bollène in the Vaucluse department of south-eastern France. Designed by architect Théodore Sardnal, it was built in 1947 and officially opened on 25 October 1952 by the French President, Vincent Auriol. Construction lasted five years.

The Donzère-Mondragon Dam is one of the largest hydroelectric dams in France, with a total installed capacity of 354 MW. The dam has a height of 58 meters and a length of 5.8 kilometers, and it consists of five turbines that generate electricity from the flow of water through the dam.

== See also ==
- Tricastin
- Renewable energy in France
