= Nuclear transparency =

Nuclear transparency is the ratio of cross-sections for exclusive processes from the nuclei to those of the nucleons.

If a nuclear cross-section is denoted as $\sigma_N$ and free nucleon cross-section as $\sigma_0$, then nuclear transparency can be defined as
$T= \sigma_N/A\sigma_0$, where $\sigma_N$ can be parameterized in terms of $\sigma_0$ as $\sigma_N =A^\alpha \sigma_0$.

Therefore, transparency can be expressed as $T= A^{\alpha -1}$.
Here, nucleon cross-section can be thought of as a hydrogen cross-section, and nuclei cross-section can be as for other targets.
