= Saint-Paul-Trois-Châteaux =

Saint-Paul-Trois-Châteaux Sant Pau de Tricastin (Occitan)
- Commune
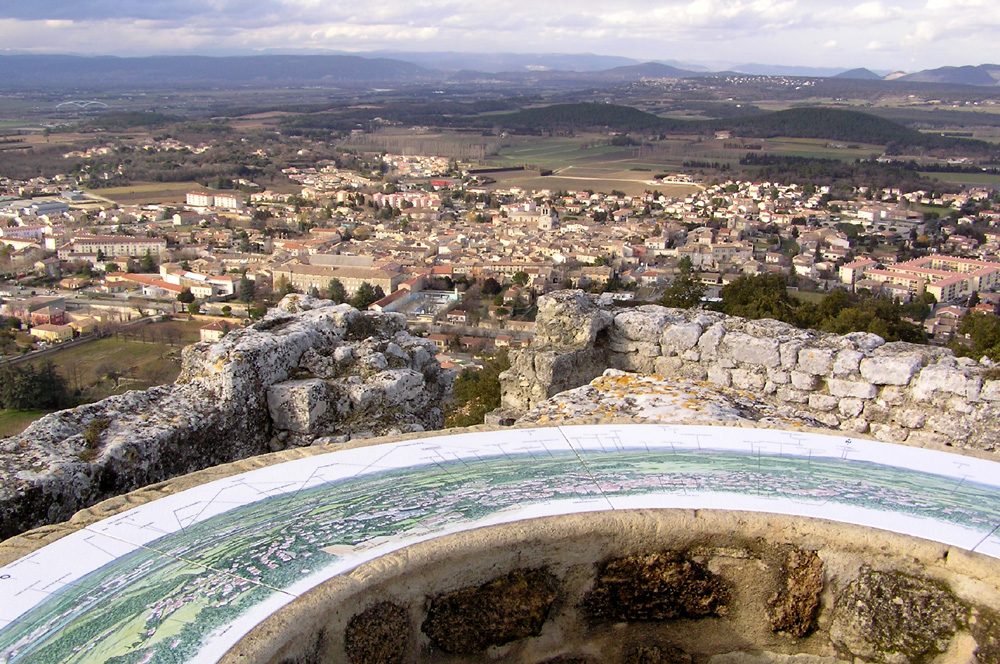
- A general view of Saint-Paul-Trois-Châteaux

- Coat of arms
- Location of Saint-Paul-Trois-Châteaux
- Location within France Location within Auvergne-Rhône-Alpes
- Coordinates: 44°20′59″N 4°46′08″E
- Country: France
- Region: Auvergne-Rhône-Alpes
- Department: Drôme
- Arrondissement: Nyons
- Canton: Le Tricastin

Government
  - Mayor (2020–2026): Jean-Michel Catelinois
- Area^{1}: 22.04 km^{2} (8.51 sq mi)
- Elevation: 111 m (364 ft)
- Highest elevation: 290 m (950 ft)
- Lowest elevation: 49 m (161 ft)
- Population (2023): 8,981
  - Density: 407.5/km^{2} (1,055/sq mi)
- Time zone: UTC+01:00 (CET)
  - Summer (DST): UTC+02:00 (CEST)
- INSEE/Postal code: 26324 /26130
- ^{1} French Land Register data, which excludes lakes, ponds, glaciers > 1 km^{2} (0.386 sq mi or 247 acres) and river estuaries.

Saint-Paul-Trois-Châteaux (French pronunciation: [sɛ̃ pɔl tʁwɑ ʃɑto]; Vivaro-Alpine: Sant Pau de Tricastin), sometimes known as St-Paul-en-Tricastin, is a commune, an administrative region, in the Drôme department in southeastern France.

== Name ==
The settlement is attested as Augusta Tricastinorum (1st c. AD), Trikastinoi ōn polis Noiomagos (2nd c.), Sancti Pauli vel Sancti Restituti Trigastinensi (993), in Tricastrinensi (1132), civitate Tricastrina (1136), San Paul (ca. 1180), Sanctum Paulum Tricastinensem (1338), and Sainct Pol Trois Chasteaux (1545).

The toponym derives from the name of the ancient Gallic tribe that dwelled in the region, the Tricastini. The insertion of an epenthetic r that changed Tricastini to Tricastrini, which is attested by the 12th century, caused a semantic reinterpretation of the name, leading eventually to the modern French Trois-Châteaux, meaning 'three-castles' (Latin Tria-Castra).

== Population ==
Historical population

Year	Pop.	±% p.a.
1793	2,040	—
1800	1,505	−4.25%
1806	1,962	+4.52%
1821	1,633	−1.22%
1831	1,982	+1.96%
1836	2,071	+0.88%
1841	2,183	+1.06%
1846	2,085	−0.91%
1851	2,192	+1.01%
1856	2,227	+0.32%
1861	2,516	+2.47%
1866	2,558	+0.33%
1872	2,315	−1.65%
1876	2,290	−0.27%
1881	2,250	−0.35%
1886	2,500	+2.13%
1891	2,427	−0.59%
1896	2,557	+1.05%
1901	2,185	−3.10%

Year	Pop.	±% p.a.
1906	1,879	−2.97%
1911	1,973	+0.98%
1921	1,528	−2.52%
1926	1,558	+0.39%
1931	1,480	−1.02%
1936	1,485	+0.07%
1946	1,270	−1.55%
1954	1,679	+3.55%
1962	2,213	+3.51%
1968	4,350	+11.92%
1975	4,349	−0.00%
1982	6,412	+5.70%
1990	6,789	+0.72%
1999	7,277	+0.77%
2007	8,340	+1.72%
2012	8,757	+0.98%
2017	8,937	+0.41%
2023	8,981	+0.08%

Source: EHESS and INSEE (1968-2023)

== Sport ==
It was the start of stage 16 of the 2011 Tour de France, 162.5 km (101 mi) to Gap, as well as the start city for stage 13 of the 2012 Tour de France, 217 km (135 mi) to Cap d'Agde.

== Twin towns – sister cities ==
Saint-Paul-Trois-Châteaux is twinned with:

- Eltmann, Germany (1975)
- Trecate, Italy (2003)

== See also ==
- Communes of the Drôme department
- Saint-Paul-Trois-Châteaux Cathedral
- Tricastin
- Tricastin Nuclear Power Plant
