= Vallée du Rhône (France) =

Region on either side of the Rhône River in France

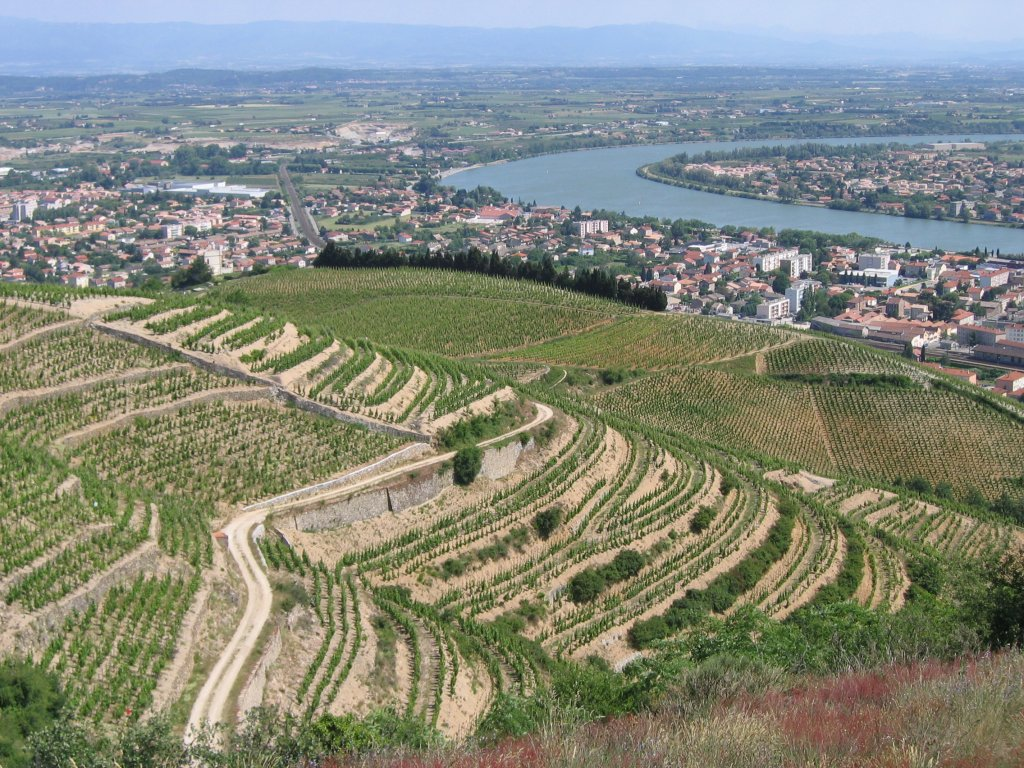
View of the Rhone Valley from the top of the Tain-l'Hermitage vineyard.

The Vallée du Rhône (French pronunciation: [vale dy ʁon]; Occitan: Vall del Ròne) of Rhône Valley is a region located on either side of the Rhône, downstream from Lyon, in the south-east of France. The city of Valence in Drôme is considered the heart of the valley.
