= Commission for Independent Research and Information on Radioactivity =

French non-governmental organization

- Commission de Recherche et d'Information Indépendantes sur la Radioactivité
- Abbreviation: CRIIRAD
- Founded: 1986
- Type: NGO
- Headquarters: Valence, France
- Region served: France and international
- Methods: Environmental monitoring, laboratory analysis, public information
- Website: www.criirad.org

The Commission for Independent Research and Information on Radioactivity (in the original French, Commission de Recherche et d'Information Indépendantes sur la Radioactivité, or CRIIRAD) is a French NGO which specializes in the analysis of radioactivity in the environment. It was created in the aftermath of the Chernobyl catastrophe on April 26, 1986. It revendicates "being independent from nuclear exploitants, the state and all political parties".

The CRIIRAD has an analysis laboratory, equipped for identification of radioactive contamination (food, water, etc.), which has been delivered the technical qualification certificate by the Health minister. It operates both in France and abroad, and is funded by its investigations (more than a thousand studies since its creation) and its memberships' adhesions. As all other French NGOs, it is regulated by the 1901 law on non-profit organizations.

Among other studies by the CRIIRAD, its investigations on the contamination of the French territory following the 1986 Chernobyl catastrophe are the most known, although it also studied the consequences of the Marcoule nuclear power plant, the Fukushima I nuclear accidents, and published an atlas of radioactive contamination in Europe and France.

== See also ==
- Yury Bandazhevsky (a Belarusian scientist, repressed by the Belarusian state, who has been supported by the CRIIRAD)
- List of Chernobyl-related articles
- Michèle Rivasi
- Nuclear waste management in France
