= Lapalud =

- Commune
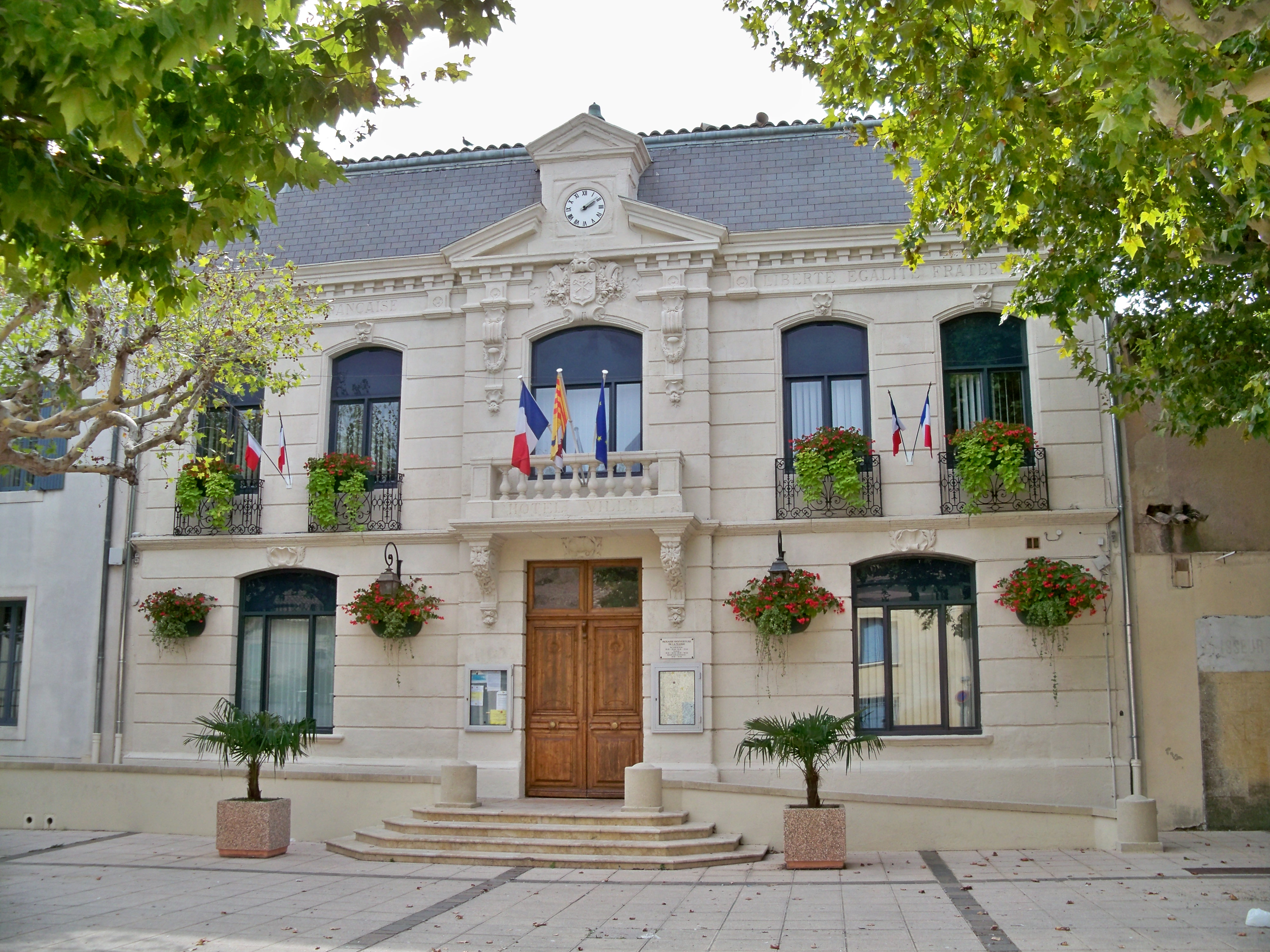
- Town hall

- Coat of arms
- Location of Lapalud
- Location within France Location within Provence-Alpes-Côte d'Azur
- Coordinates: 44°18′19″N 4°41′23″E
- Country: France
- Region: Provence-Alpes-Côte d'Azur
- Department: Vaucluse
- Arrondissement: Carpentras
- Canton: Bollène
- Intercommunality: Rhône-Lez-Provence

Government
  - Mayor (2020–2026): Hervé Flaugere
- Area^{1}: 17.37 km^{2} (6.71 sq mi)
- Elevation: 47 m (154 ft)
- Highest elevation: 59 m (194 ft)
- Lowest elevation: 42 m (138 ft)
- Population (2023): 3,853
  - Density: 221.8/km^{2} (574.5/sq mi)
- Time zone: UTC+01:00 (CET)
  - Summer (DST): UTC+02:00 (CEST)
- INSEE/Postal code: 84064 /84840
- ^{1} French Land Register data, which excludes lakes, ponds, glaciers > 1 km^{2} (0.386 sq mi or 247 acres) and river estuaries.

Lapalud (French pronunciation: [lapaly]; Occitan: La Palús) is a commune in the Vaucluse department in the Provence-Alpes-Côte d'Azur region in southeastern France.

== Population ==
Historical population
Year	Pop.	±% p.a.
1968	2,345	—
1975	2,260	−0.53%
1982	3,133	+4.78%
1990	3,332	+0.77%
1999	3,267	−0.22%
2007	3,425	+0.59%
2012	3,966	+2.98%
2017	3,805	−0.83%
2023	3,853	+0.21%
Source: INSEE

== People ==
- Rodolphe Julian (1839–1907), founder of the Académie Julian
- Alain Borne (1915–1962), poet winner of the 1954 Prix Antonin-Artaud, died in a road incident in Lapalud

== See also ==
- Communes of the Vaucluse department
- Tricastin Nuclear Power Plant
