= Pierrelatte =

- Commune
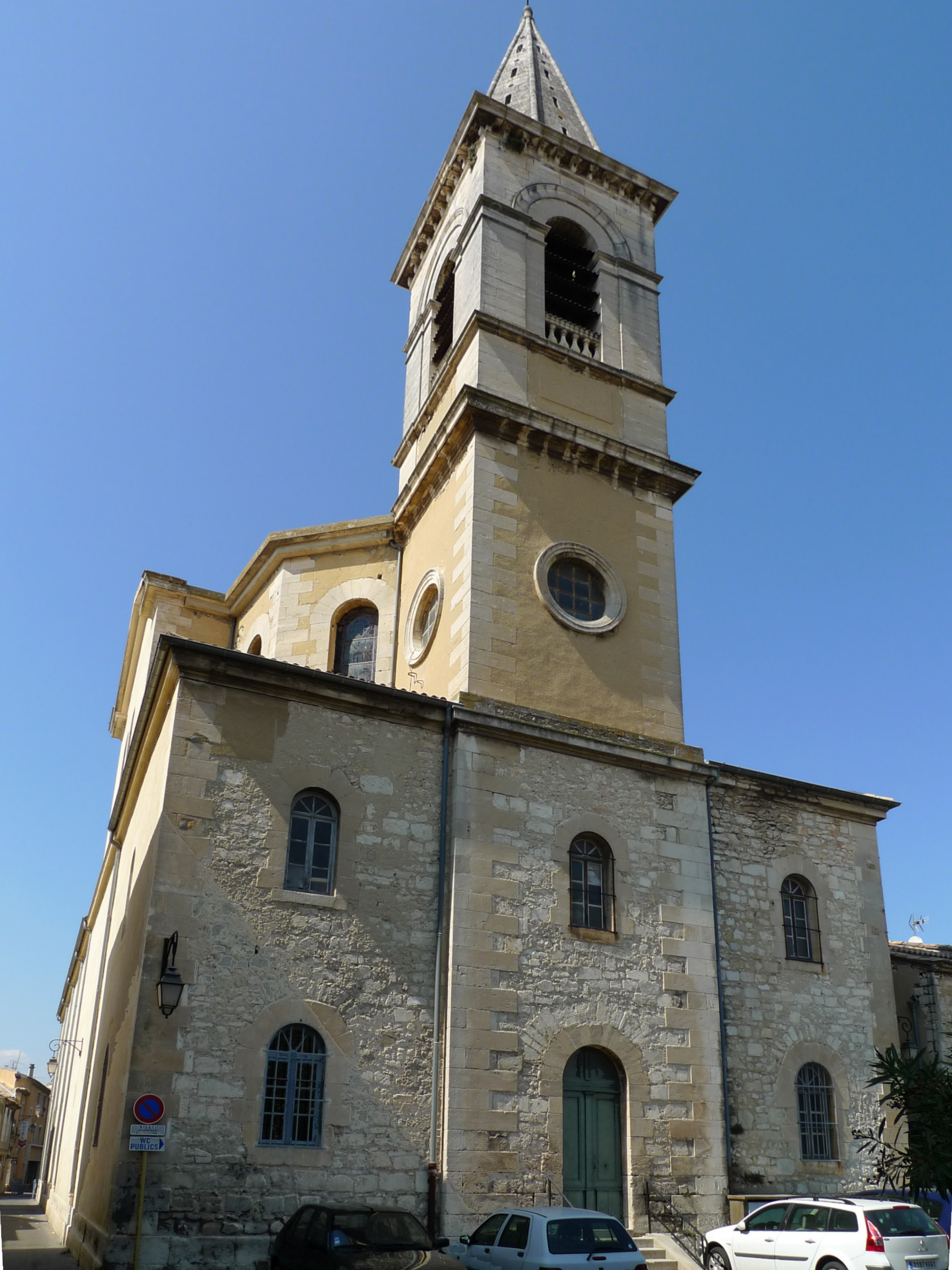
- The church of Saint-Jean-Baptiste in Pierrelatte

- Coat of arms
- Location of Pierrelatte
- Location within France Location within Auvergne-Rhône-Alpes
- Coordinates: 44°22′42″N 4°41′47″E
- Country: France
- Region: Auvergne-Rhône-Alpes
- Department: Drôme
- Arrondissement: Nyons
- Canton: Le Tricastin

Government
  - Mayor (2020–2026): Alain Gallu
- Area^{1}: 49.56 km^{2} (19.14 sq mi)
- Elevation: 60 m (200 ft)
- Highest elevation: 61 m (200 ft)
- Lowest elevation: 46 m (151 ft)
- Population (2023): 13,756
  - Density: 277.6/km^{2} (718.9/sq mi)
- Time zone: UTC+01:00 (CET)
  - Summer (DST): UTC+02:00 (CEST)
- INSEE/Postal code: 26235 /26700
- ^{1} French Land Register data, which excludes lakes, ponds, glaciers > 1 km^{2} (0.386 sq mi or 247 acres) and river estuaries.

Pierrelatte (French pronunciation: [pjɛʁlat]; Occitan: Pèiralata) is a commune in the Drôme department in southeastern France. Since the 1980s it hosts one of the biggest production plants of the enriched uranium existing in the world, used both for civil and military purposes.

== Population ==
Historical population

Year	Pop.	±% p.a.
1793	2,789	—
1800	2,536	−1.35%
1806	2,462	−0.49%
1821	2,867	+1.02%
1831	3,447	+1.86%
1836	3,409	−0.22%
1841	3,430	+0.12%
1846	3,537	+0.62%
1851	3,483	−0.31%
1856	3,453	−0.17%
1861	3,512	+0.34%
1866	3,539	+0.15%
1872	3,577	+0.18%
1876	3,579	+0.01%
1881	3,291	−1.66%
1886	3,223	−0.42%
1891	3,184	−0.24%
1896	3,218	+0.21%
1901	3,121	−0.61%

Year	Pop.	±% p.a.
1906	3,319	+1.24%
1911	3,246	−0.44%
1921	3,170	−0.24%
1926	3,252	+0.51%
1931	3,307	+0.34%
1936	3,176	−0.81%
1946	3,237	+0.19%
1954	3,448	+0.79%
1962	4,251	+2.65%
1968	9,757	+14.85%
1975	9,816	+0.09%
1982	11,596	+2.41%
1990	11,770	+0.19%
1999	11,943	+0.16%
2007	12,571	+0.64%
2012	12,952	+0.60%
2017	13,496	+0.83%
2023	13,756	+0.32%

Source: EHESS and INSEE (1968-2023)

== Personalities ==
- Jean Aurenche, screenwriter (1903-1992)
- Agnès Callamard, human rights activist and the current Secretary General of Amnesty International (born 1963)
- Jérôme Bernard, racing cyclist (born 1971)
- Cédric Séguin, fencer (born 1973)
- Anthony Cellier, French politician (born 1975)
- David Guerrier, classical trumpeter (born 1984)

== Climate ==
Climate data for Pierrelatte (1991–2020 normals, extremes 1964–present)
Month	Jan	Feb	Mar	Apr	May	Jun	Jul	Aug	Sep	Oct	Nov	Dec	Year
Record high °C (°F)	20.6 (69.1)	22.5 (72.5)	26.6 (79.9)	29.9 (85.8)	33.8 (92.8)	40.7 (105.3)	40.2 (104.4)	41.1 (106.0)	37.0 (98.6)	30.0 (86.0)	24.9 (76.8)	19.7 (67.5)	41.1 (106.0)
Mean daily maximum °C (°F)	9.4 (48.9)	11.1 (52.0)	15.6 (60.1)	18.8 (65.8)	23.0 (73.4)	27.4 (81.3)	30.3 (86.5)	30.0 (86.0)	24.8 (76.6)	19.5 (67.1)	13.4 (56.1)	9.7 (49.5)	19.4 (66.9)
Daily mean °C (°F)	5.8 (42.4)	6.8 (44.2)	10.4 (50.7)	13.3 (55.9)	17.3 (63.1)	21.4 (70.5)	24.0 (75.2)	23.7 (74.7)	19.4 (66.9)	15.1 (59.2)	9.8 (49.6)	6.4 (43.5)	14.4 (57.9)
Mean daily minimum °C (°F)	2.3 (36.1)	2.5 (36.5)	5.2 (41.4)	7.7 (45.9)	11.5 (52.7)	15.4 (59.7)	17.6 (63.7)	17.4 (63.3)	14.0 (57.2)	10.7 (51.3)	6.2 (43.2)	3.0 (37.4)	9.5 (49.1)
Record low °C (°F)	−12.5 (9.5)	−9.2 (15.4)	−8.7 (16.3)	−3.5 (25.7)	1.1 (34.0)	4.8 (40.6)	9.6 (49.3)	8.7 (47.7)	3.0 (37.4)	−1.3 (29.7)	−5.8 (21.6)	−9.7 (14.5)	−12.5 (9.5)
Average precipitation mm (inches)	61.9 (2.44)	38.5 (1.52)	46.2 (1.82)	65.4 (2.57)	68.9 (2.71)	44.7 (1.76)	40.4 (1.59)	50.9 (2.00)	102.6 (4.04)	110.6 (4.35)	111.8 (4.40)	53.3 (2.10)	795.2 (31.31)
Average precipitation days (≥ 1.0 mm)	5.9	4.8	4.9	7.3	6.7	4.7	3.8	4.1	5.8	7.5	8.3	6.1	70.0
Source: Meteociel

== See also ==
- Communes of the Drôme department
- Tricastin Nuclear Power Plant
- Georges-Besse plant
