= Autorité de sûreté nucléaire =

French nuclear safety authority

- ASN; Nuclear Safety Authority

Agency overview
- Formed: 13 June 2006
- Preceding agency: General Direction for Nuclear Safety and Radioprotection
- Dissolved: 2025
- Superseding agency: Autorité de sûreté nucléaire et de radioprotection (ASNR)
- Jurisdiction: Government of France
- Headquarters: 15 rue Louis Lejeune, 92120 Montrouge, France
- Agency executive: Bernard Doroszczuk, President
- Parent department: Independent administrative authority
- Website: www.asn.fr

The Autorité de sûreté nucléaire (English: Nuclear Safety Authority, ASN) is an independent French administrative authority set up by law 2006-686 of 13 June 2006 concerning nuclear transparency and security. It has replaced the General Direction for Nuclear Safety and Radioprotection. Its task, on behalf of the State, is to regulate nuclear safety and radiation protection in order to protect workers, patients, the public and the environment from the risks involved in nuclear activities. It also contributes to informing the citizens.

From 2006 to 2012, the president of the ASN was André-Claude Lacoste who was also a founding member and had been chairman of the International Nuclear Regulators' Association (INRA) and the Western European Nuclear Regulators' Association (WENRA). He was also the chairman of the Commission on Safety Standards (CSS) of the IAEA.

Since November 2018, the president of the ASN is Bernard Doroszczuk.

Early during the Fukushima Daiichi nuclear disaster, the ASN stated that they believed the events unfolding should be rated a 5 or even a 6 on the International Nuclear Event Scale when the Japan Atomic Energy Agency had listed them a day before as a level 4 event. Later on they said they believed the situation had surpassed that of a level 5 event and moved to a level 6. Their opinion was shared by the Finnish nuclear authorities.

During 2015 and 2016 major nuclear safety issues arose, following a discovery at the Flamanville Nuclear Power Plant, concerning about 400 large steel forgings manufactured by Areva's Le Creusot Forge since 1965 that had carbon-content irregularities that weakened the steel. A widespread programme of reactor checks was started leading to 20 of France's 58 reactors being offline in October 2016. These steel quality concerns may prevent the regulator giving the life extensions from 40 to 50 years, that had been assumed by energy planners, for many reactors. Le Creusot Forge had maintained concealed files which had now been disclosed to ASN following new management by Areva. ASN characterised the current situation in January 2017 as worrying. In April 2017 ASN published the requirements for forging to resume at Le Creusot Forge, which has been out of operation since December 2015. In 2018 ASN introduced stricter monitoring of component production in response to the problems found at Creusot Forge.

In 2025, it merged with IRSN to become ASNR.

== See also ==
- International Nuclear Regulators' Association
- Nuclear power in France
- Nuclear waste management in France
