= Institut de radioprotection et de sûreté nucléaire =

- IRSN; Radioprotection and Nuclear Safety Institute

Public establishment of an industrial and commercial nature (EPIC) overview
- Formed: 9 May 2001
- Preceding agencies: Institut de protection et de sûreté nucléaire (IPSN); Office de protection contre les rayonnements ionisants (OPRI)
- Dissolved: 1 January 2025
- Superseding Public establishment of an industrial and commercial nature (EPIC): Autorité de sûreté nucléaire et de radioprotection (ASNR)
- Jurisdiction: Government of France
- Headquarters: Fontenay-aux-Roses, France
- Employees: 1,816 (2024)
- Parent department: Ministry of Defence; Ministry for the Ecological Transition; Ministry of Industry; Ministry of Health and Research
- Website: www.irsn.fr

The French Institut de radioprotection et de sûreté nucléaire (IRSN) ("Radioprotection and Nuclear Safety Institute") located in Fontenay-aux-Roses is a public official establishment with an industrial and commercial aspect (EPIC) created by the AFSSE Act (Agence française de sécurité sanitaire de l'environnement et du travail – French Agency of Sanitary Environmental Security) and by February 22, 2002 decreed n°2002-254. The IRSN is placed under the conjoint authority of the Defence minister, the Environmental minister, the Industry minister and the Health and Research minister.

The IRSN gathers more than 1500 experts and researchers from the Institut de protection et de sûreté nucléaire (IPSN – Protection and Nuclear Safety Institute) and the Office de protection contre les rayonnements ionisants (OPRI – Ionizing radiations protection office). These scientists are thus competent on nuclear safety, radioactive protection and control of nuclear and sensitive materials.The IRSN realize investigations, expertise assessments and studies on the fields of nuclear safety, protection against ionizing radiation, protection and control of nuclear material, and protection against voluntary ill-advised acts.

== History ==
2001: creation of IRSN by law no. 2001-398 of 9 May 2001, article 51. IRSN was created from the merger of the Institute for Nuclear Protection and Safety (IPSN), which was part of the Commissariat à Atomic Energy (CEA) and the Office for Protection against Ionizing Radiation (OPRI), which was attached to the Ministry of Health, with the aim of creating a new public research and expertise establishment, independent of industrialists.

2002: operation of IRSN specified by decree no. 2002-254 of February 22, 2002.

2007: operation of IRSN modified by decree no. 2007-529 of April 6, 2007 to take account of law no. 2006-686 of June 13, 2006, relating to transparency and security in nuclear matters.

2016: operation of IRSN amended by decree no. 2016-283 of March 10, 2016 creating articles R592-15 et seq. in the environment code and repealing decree no. 2002-254 of February 22, 2002.

2025: The Nuclear Safety and Radiation Protection Authority (ASNR) created by the law on the organisation of the governance of nuclear safety and radiation protection of 21 May 2024 came into operation on 1 January 2025. It is the result of the merger of the Autorité de sûreté nucléaire (ASN) and the Institut de radioprotection et de sûreté nucléaire (IRSN).

== Organization ==
=== Presentation ===
IRSN has nearly 1,816 employees, including many specialists, engineers, researchers, doctors, agronomists, veterinarians and technicians, competent experts in nuclear safety and radiation protection as well as in the field of control of sensitive nuclear materials.

This staff is spread over 9 sites in France, with the Institute's headquarters located in Fontenay-aux-Roses. The largest facilities are located in Fontenay-aux-Roses, Vésinet and Cadarache. Establishments are also present in Cherbourg-en-Cotentin, Orsay, Saclay, Tournemire, Villeneuve-lès-Avignon and Tahiti. This last antenna is responsible for monitoring radioactive fallout from former French nuclear tests in French Polynesia.

== See also ==
- Chernobyl disaster
- Nuclear waste management in France
