= Uranium mining in France =

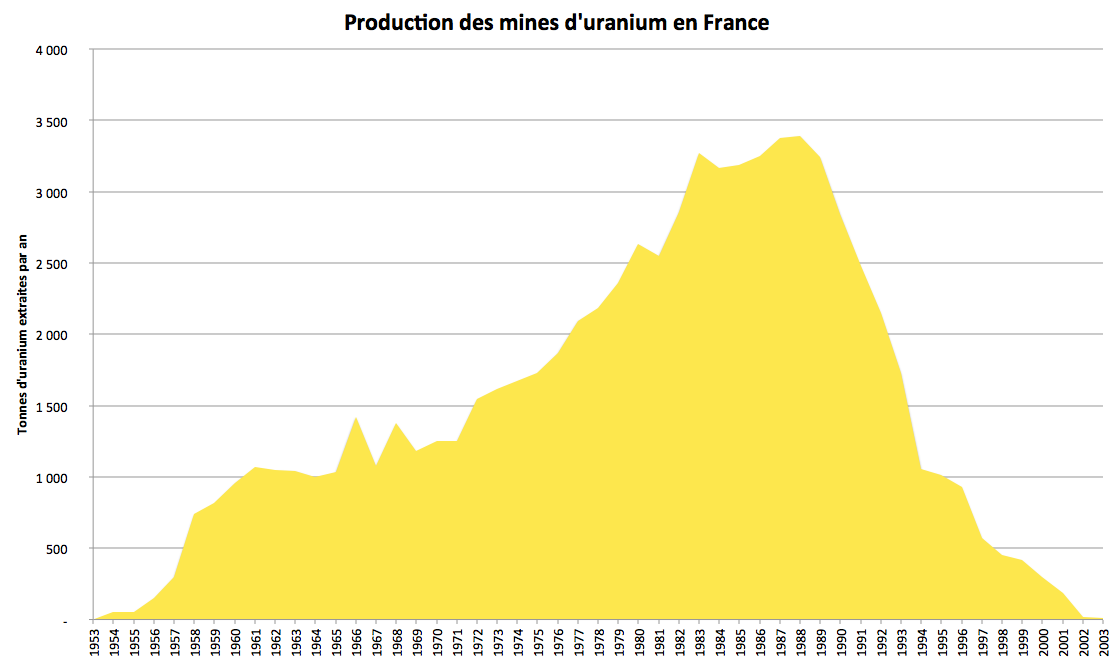
Uranium production from mines in France, from 1953 to 2002. Total cumulative production: 75,965 tonnes.

Uranium mining in France is the activity of the 210 or so uranium mines that operated in the country between 1945 and 2001. Together, these sites produced around 76,000 tonnes of uranium. This production is destined for France's nuclear program, both civil and military.

These mines are mainly located in the Massif Central (Auvergne, Limousin, Languedoc) and the Massif Armoricain (Vendée and Bretagne). Now completely closed, these mining sites have had different destinies, from renaturation to rehabilitation.

== History ==
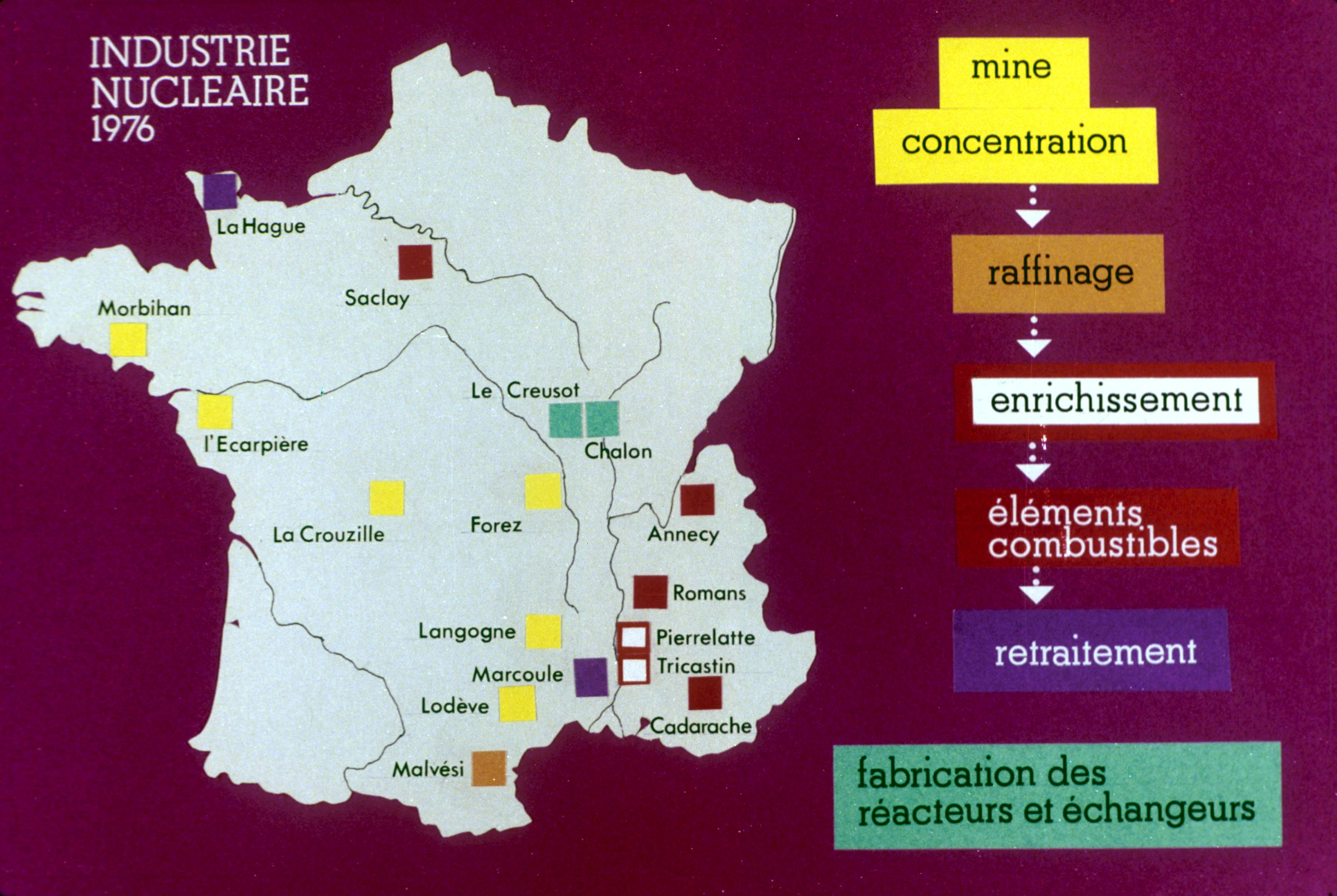
Map of the nuclear industry in France in 1976.

Having made the choice to become a nuclear power, both civil and military, France set out in the 1940s to ensure its self-sufficiency in uranium.

France's richest deposits contain between one and five kilograms of uranium per tonne of ore, but under difficult operating conditions (underground mines) and in the face of sometimes strong local opposition. These mines have been opened and operated mainly by French Alternative Energies and Atomic Energy Commission (Commissariat à l'énergie atomique et aux énergies alternatives, CEA by its acronym in French), and since 1976 by its subsidiary Cogema, along with a number of private companies.

In France, mining began just after the Second World War, when General de Gaulle created the Commissariat à l'Energie Atomique on October 18, 1945.

The first French uranium boss was André Savornin, a mining engineer with long experience of mining in Africa, who was appointed head of the Mining Research and Exploitation Department of the Atomic Energy Commission. Despite makeshift resources and meagre budgets, he quickly launched prospecting commandos in France (Lachaux, Saint-Symphorien-de-Marmagne, Grury, Limousin), Madagascar, Côte d'Ivoire and French Equatorial Africa. On December 2, 1945, the CEA Prospecting School was created within the Natural History Museum, and in 1955, at La Crouzille, it became CIPRA.

According to Antoine Paucard, the historian who documented this adventure, France was in the "time of conquest" (1951-1958). On August 31, 1952, the CEA's mining workforce in France and overseas totaled 1,155. From the beginning of the year to the end of September 1952, 51 tonnes of metal were delivered to the Le Bouchet plant; 9 tonnes were held in stock by the divisions, for a total production of 60 tonnes. In July 1953, the CEA decided that chemical ore processing would replace physical processing. The first plant was built at Gueugnon in 1955. The Vendée division was created on January 1, 1954. In February 1954, the CEA discovers the massive pitchblende lens at Bois-Noirs, near Saint-Priest-la-Prugne in the Forez mountains. On January 7, 1956, France's first graphite-fired nuclear reactor is commissioned at Marcoule. It uses natural uranium. Its arrival triggers a vigorous resumption of overseas research: the CEA puts the brakes on, then stops Morocco, but goes to the Sahara : Adrar des Ifoghas, Aïr, Hoggar, Tibesti. It also went to Oubangui-Chari and Cameroon, using aerial prospecting. Boko Songo, in the Congo, a resounding failure, was nevertheless arrested. At the end of December 1956, the CEA discovered the "Mounana showing" in Gabon, which yielded a "magnificent truffle" of 5,000 tonnes of uranium. The Compagnie des Mines d'Uranium de Franceville was founded in February 1958.

Madagascar was extensively prospected by the CEA between 1945 and 1968, a period during which several aspects of beryl mining and various uranium and thorium minerals were successively tackled: prospecting, mining, mechanical processing. Despite cumulative production of 1,000 tonnes of uranium and 3,200 tonnes of thorium, the results were not sufficient to reach industrial scale. The 1960s marked the end of the French Community, with national production concentrated solely in metropolitan France.

France was part of the 1972-1976 uranium producers cartel, Societe d'Etudes de Recherches d'Uranium. The other cartel members were Australia, South Africa, and Rio Tinto Zinc Ltd. It was formed by the major non-United States uranium producers to mitigate the impacts of US policy on the uranium market; to do so, the cartel engaged in bid rigging, price fixing, and market sharing. Westinghouse filed an antitrust lawsuit against cartel members in 1976 and the cartel disbanded.

In 1976, the CEA handed over the exploitation of its metropolitan deposits to Cogema. The École de prospection pour l'uranium at Razès, headquarters of the CEA's mining division, was renamed the Centre international d'enseignement en prospection et valorisation des minerais radioactifs industriels de Razès (CIPRA) and closed in 1987.

Production peaked in the 1980s, before declining until the Jouac mine in Haute-Vienne closed in 2001, when mining was relocated, notably to Niger. The main known deposit not yet exploited in France is the Coutras site in Aquitaine, where Cogema has identified a potential of 20,000 tonnes (0.5% of the world total), but with few sufficiently profitable sites.

Following the closure of the last French mine in 2001, a few tonnes of uranium are still produced annually until 2011, by processing resins from mine drainage water from the former Lodève mine in southern France.

The former sites are almost all under the responsibility of Orano Cycle. They include 210 exploration or extraction sites (of which only around twenty produced more than 1,000 t of uranium), as well as ore processing sites (eight sites with mills) and processing tailings storage sites (15 sites). These potentially hazardous sites are spread across 25 départements and listed in IRSN's Mimausa database. They produced 52 million tonnes of ore, including 76,000 tonnes of uranium, and left around 166 million tonnes of radioactive waste rock and 51 million tonnes of processing residues.

The Urêka museum, which opened in July 2013, traces the history of the nuclear industry in France, the techniques used for prospecting, uranium mining, ore and radioactive waste processing and site redevelopment, with an emphasis on the local history of the Limousin region.

== Location of mines ==
All uranium mine sites are listed in the Mimausa program database, set up by the Institut de radioprotection et de sûreté nucléaire.

=== Deposits ===
Most deposits are located:

- in the Massif Central, and particularly in Limousin, in the Haute-Vienne department, where the most productive sites were located (Crouzille mining division), and which alone counted up to fifty mines in operation. Other mines were located in Languedoc-Roussillon (Hérault and Lozère), Rhône-Alpes (in the Loire département), Auvergne (west and south-east Allier; Cantal; north-central Haute-Loire), Aveyron and Morvan;
- in Vendée (Vendée mining division), covering the departments of Deux-Sèvres, Loire-Atlantique and Maine-et-Loire);
- in Brittany, 22 sites were mined in Morbihan between 1956 and 1984;
- in Alsace.

Other, more localized deposits have been mined from time to time in the southern Alps and northern Aquitaine.

=== Processing ===
Plants for extracting and concentrating uranium from ore, all associated with a mine, were located at:

- Bessines (La Crouzille, Haute-Vienne), which processes ores from the Crouzille Division's Margnac, Le Brugeaud, Fanay/Les Sagnes and Le Fraisse, Bellezane mines;
- Jouac/Le Bernardan (Haute-Vienne);
- Le Bosc (Hérault);
- Gueugnon (Saône-et-Loire); chemical ore processing plant opened in 1955;
- Les Bois-Noirs in Saint-Priest-la-Prugne, a deposit discovered around 1951, following the discovery and mining of the Lachaux (Puy-de-Dôme) and Grury (Saône-et-Loire) deposits in 1949. In 2015, AREVA announced the abandonment of its project to rehabilitate the Bois Noirs uranium site, which had been closed in 1990. The plant was opened there in 1960 by the Forez/Grury Division; it replaced the Gueugnon plant for this division, which also owned the Grury mine (Saône-et-Loire). The Division Minière du Forez was closed in 1981 when the Bois-Noirs deposit was exhausted;
- Le Cellier, hamlet in the commune of Saint-Jean-la-Fouillouse (Lozère);
- Saint-Pierre (Cantal);
- the Écarpière mine in Gétigné (a plant in Loire-Atlantique that processes ore from the Division minière de Vendée, which operates the Écarpière, Commanderie, Chardon and Chapelle-Largeau mines. The Ecarpière mine is located in Loire-Atlantique, near Maine-et-Loire), operated by AREVA NC, closed in 1990 and since redeveloped. According to 3 studies commissioned from CRIIRAD between 1991 and 1993 by the municipality, the slag heap contains 11 million tonnes of highly radiotoxic radioactive residues;
- the Baconnière Mine in Roussay is now submerged, and according to CRIIRAD a source of radioactive contamination for the environment;
- the Chardon mine in Gorges, closed in 1991, is partly flooded, with at least one resurgence.

Summary treatment (leaching on landscaped areas) has been carried out at nine other sites.

Fifteen waste rock heaps have been recognized by IRSN, including - in addition to the eight sites mentioned above - at:

- Bellezane (Haute-Vienne)
- Montmassacrot (Haute-Vienne)
- Bertholène (Aveyron)
- Rophin (Puy-de-Dôme)
- La Ribière (Creuse)
- La Commanderie (Deux-Sèvres and Vendée)
- Teufelsloch (Haut-Rhin)

Other sites are monitored for having been dedicated to extraction (underground or open-cast, trenching for the smallest sites), to a lesser extent in the Alps and Aquitaine.

Non-exhaustive location of uranium mines.

== See also ==
- Uranium mining
- List of countries by uranium production
- Nuclear power in France
- Nuclear fuel cycle in France
