= Nuclear fuel cycle in France =

Nuclear operations in supplying fuel to French nuclear reactors

The nuclear fuel cycle in France comprises all the operations involved in supplying fuel to French nuclear reactors and managing irradiated fuel. These operations include ore extraction, uranium concentration, conversion, enrichment, fuel fabrication, irradiation in reactors, recycling, and waste management.

In France, the upstream and downstream parts of the cycle are handled by companies in the Orano Group (formerly Areva).

Ore, mined in mainland France from the 1950s until the late 1990s, is now entirely imported. It is then converted at the Comurhex plants in Malvési (Aude) and Pierrelatte (Drôme), then enriched at the Georges-Besse II plant on the Tricastin nuclear site. The original Georges-Besse plant closed in 2012. Reactor fuel assemblies are manufactured by Framatome on the Romans nuclear site for normal fuel and by Orano Melox on the Marcoule nuclear site for Mox, a fuel composed of uranium and plutonium. Orano also conducts reprocessing, which separates fission products and actinides from spent nuclear fuel.

After three years of irradiation, spent nuclear fuel has been transformed, with the appearance of plutonium, fission products, and minor actinides. What's more, around 1% of the fissile 235 isotope remains, more than in natural uranium (0.7%), and it may be worth enriching this spent uranium for recycling.

After being stored for a year in a deactivation pool at a nuclear power plant, spent nuclear fuel assemblies are transported to the La Hague reprocessing plant in the Manche region of France, where all the recoverable radionuclides are separated from the other elements, which are treated as waste. This operation is undertaken after a further three to five years of storage in a pool to allow radioactivity to decay.

La Hague has the capacity to reprocess about 1,700 tons of spent fuel per year. One-third of the uranium recovered at La Hague (i.e. 280 tons per year) is re-enriched, enabling the annual production of 35 tons of enriched reprocessed uranium (ERU) fuel. Plutonium and reprocessed uranium are then sent to the Melox plant to manufacture Mox for use in one of the 22 authorized power plants.

On December 31, 2007, a total of 1,150,969 m^{3} of waste was stored at the various sites, including 2,293 m^{3} of high-level waste. The Morvilliers repository in the Aube region of France receives very low-level waste, while the nearby Soulaines repository accepts low- and intermediate-level short-lived waste. Long-lived and high-level (HL) waste will be accepted at these deep sites, which will be defined before 2015.

On November 28, 2008, EDF communicated its cycle development forecasts for the period 2007-2017 to the supervisory authorities based on four scenarios. On May 9, 2011, the ASN requested that an additional study be carried out within a year, taking into account the lessons learned from the Fukushima nuclear accident, particularly about deactivation pools and a downward revision of annual production.

== Closed cycle with reprocessing ==
Nuclear fuel cycle in France.

The nuclear fuel cycle includes uranium mining, uranium concentration, conversion, enrichment, fuel fabrication, irradiation in reactors, recycling, and waste management.

This cycle can be open, whereby spent fuel irradiated in reactors undergoes no further treatment and is sent to storage sites of varying design depending on the country, as is the case in Sweden and the United States. It can be closed, with the spent fuel undergoing treatment in specialized plants to recover plutonium and uranium for recycling and eventual reuse, while the final waste is permanently stored on specialized sites.

France has opted for the so-called “closed cycle” with reprocessing, as have the Netherlands, Russia, and Japan.

Depending on the source of supply, uranium arrives in France either in its natural state, with a simple concentration treatment carried out at the extraction site, after which it is converted and enriched in France, or already enriched. For example, Kazakh uranium is converted and enriched in Russia, while uranium from Niger is converted and enriched in France.

After irradiation in the reactors, the fuel is processed to extract plutonium and so-called reprocessed uranium, some of which is stored, thus constituting a reserve, and some of which can be used to manufacture new nuclear fuel, enriched reprocessed uranium. The plutonium, mixed with depleted uranium from the enrichment stage, is recycled into new MOX (mixed oxide fuel). This new fuel is then used in nuclear power plants that accept this type of fuel, saving 900t of natural uranium out of the 8400t consumed annually.

In 2022, Bernard Doroszczuk, Chairman of the French Nuclear Safety Authority, called for “a major overhaul of Orano's aging fuel cycle processing facilities.” In February 2024, the French Nuclear Policy Council approved the continuation of nuclear fuel reprocessing and recycling in France for new reactors to be built between now and 2040-2045. With a minimum lifespan of 60 years, France is looking ahead to 2100. To accomplish this, the government is planning a program to extend the lives of La Hague and Melox beyond 2040, and launched studies on a new MOX fabrication plant and a new reprocessing plant.

== Natural uranium mining ==
=== History ===
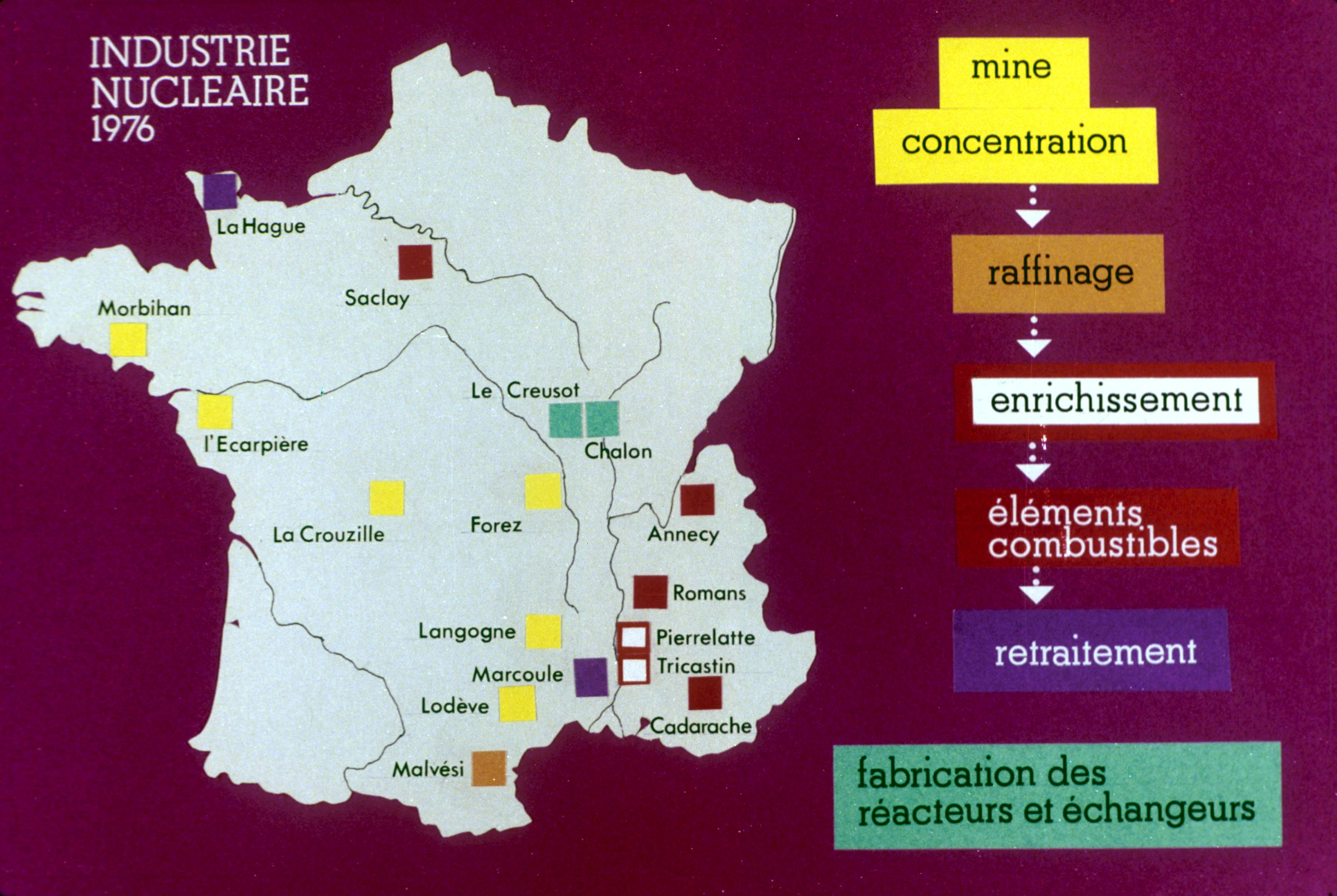
Map of the French nuclear industry in 1976: Cogema Comurhex Comurhex, Eurodif SICN, CERCA, CEA Cogema Framatome

Uranium mining in France began immediately after the Second World War, with the creation of the Commissariat à l'Energie Atomique (Atomic Energy Commission) by General de Gaulle on October 18, 1945. In the early 1950s, numerous deposits were discovered: in Limousin from 1948 to 1950, then in Vendée in 1951, in Forez in 1954, and finally in Hérault in 1957. At the same time, significant deposits were discovered abroad: the Arlit mine in Niger and the Cluff Lake deposit in Canada came on stream in 1968.

The first oil crisis boosted prospecting and production, and uranium prices rose in 1973. New deposits were discovered and brought on stream in Aveyron, Allier, Creuse, Corrèze, and, in 1974, Gironde. The latter was not exploited, however, as it was insufficiently rich. In 1976, the CEA handed over the exploitation of its metropolitan deposits to its subsidiary, Compagnie Générale des Matières Nucléaires (Cogema). New deposits were discovered in the Hérault region in 1981.

In 1988, the French nuclear industry produced 3,420 tons of uranium in the course of the year, or 5.6% of the world's total, estimated at 61,000 tons at the time. However, the necessity was growing, and the conditions for exploiting deposits in mainland France were becoming less profitable. From then on, France's uranium supply came from mines in Australia (Ranger in particular), Niger, Gabon and Canada.

In 1995, the last operating shaft in the Limousin region, at Margnac, was closed.

In 2001, the last mine in operation, the Jouac mine in the Haute-Vienne region, ceased production. Reputed to be France's richest deposit, with over 5 kg of uranium per tonne of ore, mining at depths of over 400 meters was no longer profitable.

=== Mines in France ===
Uranium can occur naturally in rocks, soils, continental waters, or seawater. In France, the deposits that have been mined are located either in magmatic rocks or in sedimentary soils.

Ore from magmatic rocks results from the migration and precipitation of granitic magma solutions into the earth's upper crust along zones of disturbance. The Morvan, Limousin, and Vendée sites fall into this category. The Morvan deposits are associated with the Luzy granitic batholith, those in Limousin with the Monts d'Ambazac granitic massif, and those in Vendée with the Mortagne granitic massif. Sedimentary deposits result from the alteration of igneous rocks and the concentration of debris in other types of sedimentary rock, consolidated or unconsolidated. The Lodève deposit, located in the Permian sandstones of the Hérault region, falls into this category.

Ore is extracted and mined either in open-pit mines, which account for 30% of France's metalliferous mines, or in underground galleries. While open-cast mining offers the advantages of lower costs and greater production capacity, it also has a greater impact on the landscape and the environment. In Limousin, for example, the Brugeaud mine created an excavation 15 ha in size and 130 m deep. Between 1955 and 1972, an estimated 20 million tonnes of rock were extracted from the quarry alone, while only 2,124 tons of uranium were extracted from the quarry and gallery site as a whole. IRSN lists 217 mining sites in France, spread over 25 departments.

Uranium from foreign mines arrives in the port of Le Havre and is then transferred to the Comurhex plant in Malvési for conversion into UF4.

The low-grade ore requires concentration. Processing involves both physical operations (pre-concentration and conditioning) and chemical operations (acid etching of the ore and purification of the concentrate). It requires fairly extensive facilities that discharge large quantities of solid and liquid waste. Ten uranium concentration processing plants have existed in France. Each of Cogema's mining divisions had such a facility: l'Escarpière for the Vendée division, Bessines for the La Crouzille division, Saint-Priest-la-Prugne for the Forez division.

Three other private mine operators have existed in France: Société Industrielle et Minière de l'Uranium (SIMURA), which exploited deposits in the Bonote region near Pontivy (Morbihan); Compagnie Française des Minerais d'Uranium (CFMU) in Lozère; and Société Centrale de l'Uranium et des Minerais Radioactifs (SCUMRA), which operated the Saint-Pierre deposit in the Cantal region. Each has its conversion plant.

These sites supplied 52 million tons of ore, including 76,000 tons of uranium, and left around 166 million tons of waste rock and 51 million tons of tailings.

Uranium production trends in France between 2000 and 2010, according to World Nuclear Association statistics, are shown in the table below. Following the closure of the last French mine in 2001, a few tons of uranium are still produced annually, through the treatment of resins from mine drainage water at the former Lodève mine in southern France.

2000	2001	2002	2003	2004	2005	2006	2007	2008	2009	2010
320	195	20	9	7	7	5	4	5	8	7

=== Uranium imports ===
Since the closure of the last French mine in 2001, France no longer produces uranium directly and imports it in its entirety. Its supply strategy, through its main operator EDF, is based on diversification of sources, both geographically, with materials from deposits in Canada, Australia, Kazakhstan, or Africa, and in terms of suppliers. In 2011, EDF sourced 40% of its materials from Areva and 60% from other suppliers. In line with the conclusions of the Roussely report on the future of the French nuclear industry, published by the Élysée Palace in June 2010, in February 2011 EDF examined the possibility of becoming a reference shareholder in Areva's mining division.

Orano, which has been present in Mongolia for 25 years, is carrying out a pilot on-site test from July 2021 to December 2022 to extract uranium from the Zuuvch Ovoo deposit, in partnership with the Mongolian state-owned company Mon-Atom. Mongolia has the largest reserves in Asia, but they are still poorly exploited. Emmanuel Macron supported the uranium mine project during his visit to Mongolia in May 2023. In 2023, despite sanctions linked to the war in Ukraine, France imports almost 54% of its enriched uranium from Russia.

== Conversion ==
=== Conversion to uranium tetrafluoride ===
The uranium tetrafluoride (UF_{4}) produced by the Comurhex plant in Malvési is transformed into uranium hexafluoride (UF_{6}) in the Comurhex plant in Pierrelatte.

Conversion involves transforming uranium concentrate from the mines into a gaseous state for use in enrichment plants. Conversion takes place in two stages. The uranium concentrate is first transformed into uranium tetrafluoride (UF_{4}) and then into uranium hexafluoride (UF_{6}).

In the first stage, the pulverized “yellowcake” uranium concentrate is dissolved in nitric acid, yielding a solution of uranyl nitrate UO_{2}(NO_{3})_{2}. After filtration, this is purified by solvent extraction with a TBP solution. This step yields uranyl nitrate UO_{2}(NO_{3})_{2} of high purity (> 99.95%). The actual conversion consists of precipitating the uranyl nitrate with ammonia gas to obtain ammonium diuranate (NH_{4})_{2}U_{2}O_{7} (UAN), which is then calcined at around 400°C to produce UO_{3}. The latter is reduced by hydrogen to obtain UO_{2}, which is ultimately transformed into uranium tetrafluoride UF_{4} by hydrofluorination with hydrofluoric acid HF in a furnace.

These operations are carried out at the Comurhex plant at Malvési, an Areva subsidiary located near Narbonne (Aude). To renew this plant, as well as the one at Tricastin, Areva has invested €610 million in new uranium conversion plants at both sites. Civil engineering work began in November 2009, and commissioning is scheduled for 2013. Full production capacity, based on 15,000 tons per year, is scheduled for 2015, with possible expansion to 21,000 tons per year.

=== Transformation into uranium hexafluoride ===
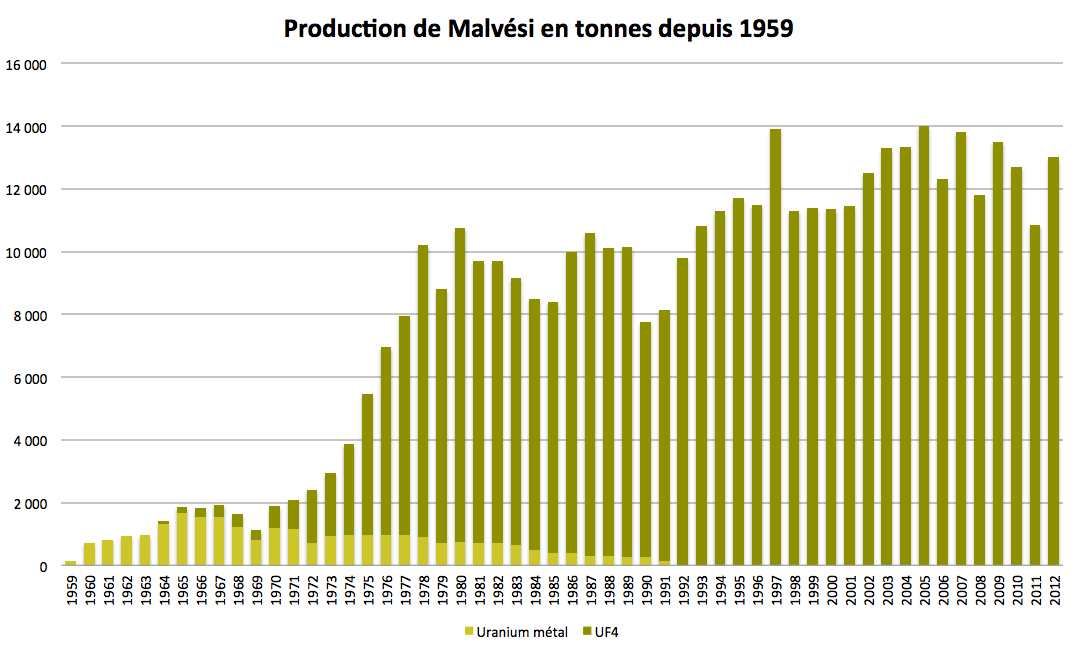
Production of the Malvési plant over the period 1959-2012.

The Comurhex plant in Pierrelatte processes uranium tetrafluoride from Malvési, producing materials for various industrial sectors:

- The nuclear industry: uranium hexafluoride (UF_{6}) for nuclear fuel used to generate electricity, and chlorine trifluoride for industrial cleaning of installations,
- The microelectronics industry: tungsten hexafluoride and fluorine for the manufacture of chip cards for telephones, GPS, etc.),
- The automotive industry: a mixture of fluorine and nitrogen for sealing automobile fuel tanks.

Annual tonnages of finished products are as follows:

Product	2004	2005	2006	2007	2008	2009	2010
Natural UF_{6}	14,400	14,000	12,300	13,789		12,300	12,850
U_{3}O_{8}	162	0	466	537			
Fluoride Products	70,5	58	59	51			

Orano inaugurated its new Comurhex 2 natural uranium-to-uranium hexafluoride conversion plant at Tricastin in September 2018; the investment was six years behind schedule and saw its bill double to €1.15 billion. Comurhex 2 reduces ammonia, nitric acid, and water consumption compared with the old plant, which was shut down at the end of 2017. In 2018, Orano expected production to reach 5,000 tons by mid-2019, then 15,000 tons by the end of 2020, its maximum capacity. Since then Orano has lowered maximum capacity to 14,000 tons and in 2025 said Comurhex 2 produced "more than 12,000 metric tons."

Annual production of tons UF6 is as follows:

Product	2020	2021	2022	2023	2024	2025
Natural UF6	2,400	8,600	8,900	10,060	10,625	more than 12,000

== Enrichment ==
=== Enriched uranium production ===
The UF_{6} material is enriched in the Georges-Besse enrichment plant in Tricastin (Drôme).

The material produced by the Comurhex plant at Pierrelatte is then enriched by gaseous diffusion at the Tricastin nuclear site, in the Georges-Besse II plant operated by Orano.

The original Georges-Besse plant operated by Eurodif Production shut down in 2012. The process is based on the very small mass difference between molecules of uranium 235 hexafluoride (mass 349), which are lighter than those of uranium 238 hexafluoride (mass 352). By filtering them through suitable membranes, a sufficiently large number of cycles can be used to obtain enriched uranium. However, this technique is very energy-intensive: around 2,500 kWh are required per separation work unit (SWU) (5 SWUs are needed to produce one kilogram of 3.7% enriched uranium from 9 kg of natural uranium). To operate the Georges Besse plant (Eurodif) at its full production capacity of 10.8 million SWU per year, three of the four 900 MWe EDF reactors at the Tricastin site needed to be mobilized.

Built in 1988, the plant had a design life of 25 years at the time of construction, which should have led to the end of operations in 2003. However, maintenance operations and building modernization will extend this lifespan by at least ten years, bringing the end of activity to 2013. Given the time required to appraise and build a new plant, in 2003 Areva began thinking about a new project that would be technically and commercially acceptable.

Three processes were competing to replace the Georges-Besse plant: gaseous diffusion, Laser SILVA enrichment, and centrifugation. For reasons of economics, reliability, and speed of implementation, Areva opted for centrifugation, acquiring the technology from its European competitor Urenco. Industrial agreements were signed on November 24, 2003, providing for Areva to acquire a 50% stake in ETC (Enrichment Technology Company), the Urenco subsidiary that develops the technology and manufactures the centrifuges, as well as transferring the right to use the technology and purchase centrifuges from Areva. This agreement was conditional on the signature of a quadripartite intergovernmental agreement between France and the three signatories of the Treaty of Almelo (Germany, the United Kingdom, and the Netherlands) and on the agreement of the European competition authorities. The agreement was signed in Cardiff on July 8, 2005. The contract covers 30 years, extendable by tacit agreement for a further 10 years. Construction took 4 years, and the new plant was inaugurated on December 14, 2010, by Areva CEO Anne Lauvergeon, in the presence of over a hundred customers.

Georges-Besse II has current capacity of 7.5 million SWU per year. In 2023 Orano's board of directors approved a 30% expansion that will add 2.5 million SWU per year capacity by 2028 at an estimated cost of €1.7 billion.

=== Use of depleted uranium ===
9 kg of UF_{6} are transformed into 1 kg of enriched Uranium and 8 kg of depleted Uranium.

To produce 1 kg of enriched uranium, 9 kg of natural uranium is required and 8 kg of depleted uranium is produced in the form of hexafluoride. To facilitate storage, the hexafluoride must be defluorinated, after which it is transformed into stable triuranium octaoxide known as “depleted U_{3}O_{8}.” This operation is carried out at Areva NC's plant W on the Tricastin site.

U_{3}O_{8} comes in the form of a gray-black powder with low radioactivity. The powder is stable up to 1,300°, incombustible, non-corrosive, and insoluble, and is comparable to the natural uranium oxide found in mined deposits. It is packaged in sealed metal containers, known as “green cubes,” with an average capacity of around 7 tU. These are then stored either at Bessines-sur-Gartempe, in the Haute-Vienne region of France, or on the Tricastin site itself.

This depleted uranium can either be used in the manufacture of Mox at the Melox plant in Marcoule (around 100 tons per year) or be re-enriched and used in the composition of conventional fuel assemblies. The latter solution is only conceivable in the event of a sharp rise in uranium prices. This was the case in 2008 when some 7,700 tU of depleted U_{3}O_{8} were shipped from Bessines to Malvesi for conversion before re-enrichment. By the end of 2008, 6146 tU had been reconverted into UF_{6}. However, these quantities remain marginal in accumulated stocks.

According to the Haut Comité pour la transparence et l'information sur la sécurité nucléaire ( the tonnage of depleted uranium stored at various sites in France), at December 31, 2008 was as follows.

Total	Bessines	Tricastin	Comurhex Malvési	La Hague	Melox Marcoule	FBFC Romans
261,000	100,400	158,400	1,800	200	100	100

With the commissioning of the Georges-Besse II enrichment plant in 2012, the conditions for re-enrichment will be much more cost-effective, thanks to the ultracentrifugation process, which consumes much less energy than the gaseous diffusion process currently in use. All of these stocks could then be reused, for 30 to 50 years. These stocks are therefore an important strategic reserve.

== Fuel fabrication ==
Two types of fuel are manufactured for nuclear power plants: uranium oxide (UO_{2}) and mixed uranium and plutonium oxide (MOX).

=== Uranium oxide ===
The enriched uranium is transferred to the FBFC plant in Romans to manufacture UO2 fuel assemblies and to the Melox plant in Marcoule to produce Mox.

Uranium oxide pellets are manufactured at the Areva subsidiary Franco-Belge de Fabrication du Combustible (FBFC) plant on the Romans nuclear site.

After enrichment, uranium hexafluoride is converted to uranium oxide (UO_{2}) using a dry process. The UF_{6} is vaporized by heating in an oven and bringing it into contact with superheated steam. UF_{6} is hydrolyzed to UO_{2}F_{2} between 250°C and 300°C. The UO_{2}F_{2} compound is then reduced by hydrogen at around 700 to 800°C, producing UO_{2} in powder form. The yield is greater than 99.5%. The powder thus obtained is compacted in the presence of a lubricant (zinc stearate) to obtain cylindrical pellets 13.5 mm high and 8 mm in diameter. The pellets are then fired in a sintering furnace at 1,700°C, in a reducing atmosphere containing hydrogen, machined to adjust their shape and facilitate insertion into the sheaths, and finally tested.

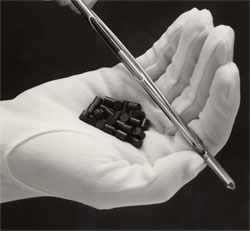
Nuclear fuel pellets.

The fuel pellets are placed in a tube around 4 meters long, containing a stack of around 360 pellets, forming what is known as a rod. The cladding surrounding the pellets is made of a zirconium alloy. The advantage of this material is that it can withstand high temperatures and a highly corrosive environment and does not absorb neutrons.

The alloy is supplied by producers in the form of a zirconium sponge. This is transformed by heating in an electric arc furnace into ingots, which are then forged, heat-treated, and quenched into cylindrical billets 20 cm in diameter. To be transformed into tubes, the bar undergoes hot extrusion, cold rolling, and annealing. The sheath tube is then precision-rolled to the required dimensions: 9.5 mm outside diameter and 0.57 mm thickness. Areva subsidiary Cezus is the world leader in the manufacture of zirconium alloy cladding for fuel assembly tubes.

The rods are then assembled in vertical arrays of around 250 parallel rods. Horizontal grids hold the rods together, while a gripping device at the top of the assembly facilitates handling and allows them to be hooked into the core. The same Romans plant manufactures the assemblies.

=== MOX ===
MOX fuel is a nuclear fuel made from around 7% plutonium and 93% depleted uranium. It is part of a uranium cycle loop, as it enables the reuse of plutonium produced in nuclear reactors and depleted uranium produced in enrichment plants. In its elemental state, it takes the form of pellets 0.8 cm in diameter and weighs around ten grams, similar to uranium oxide pellets. The raw material is a mixture of plutonium oxide, depleted uranium oxide, and chamotte powders obtained from scrap pellets, to which depleted uranium is added to obtain the precise content required by customers (between 3 and 12%). This powder is then fired in a furnace and shaped into pellets. These are then placed in zirconium alloy tubes, which are then assembled.

At the CEA/Cadarache center, the Atelier de Technologie du Plutonium (ATPu - Plutonium Technology Workshop) was commissioned in 1962 to manufacture Mox fuel for the Phénix and Superphénix fast neutron reactors. On the same site, the Laboratoire de Purification Chimique (LPC - Chemical Purification Laboratory) carries out quality controls on this production and handles scrap. In 1987, ATPu was authorized to manufacture mox for light water reactors, and in 1991 capacity was increased to 40 tons per year of mox, mainly for the German manufacturer Siemens. However, following an IPSN report on the site's extreme exposure to seismic risk, the DSIN (which became the ASN in 2006) called for its closure in 1995. Production was not finally halted until 2003. Dismantling began in 2008 and will be completed in 2012.

Today, the Melox plant on the Marcoule site manufactures this type of fuel, with a production capacity of around 200 tons per year. Authorized in 1990, the plant went into production in 1997, then increased its output from 100 t/year to 145 t/year in 2003, then to 195 t/year in 2007. Melox production fell consistently from 2016 to a low of 51 tons in 2021 after a change in the production of depleted uranium led to a high discard rate for depleted uranium grains. But production has been increasing since 2021 and reached 100 t/year again in 2025.

In 2011, 22 reactors were authorized to use MOX fuel, which accounted for just under 10% of nuclear power generation. As of 2024, all 32 of EDF's 900-megawatt reactors were authorized to use MOX fuel and EDF hopes to test 'MOX2' fuel -- MOX fuel that is recycled again after irradiation.

== Reactor irradiation ==
The UO2 or Mox fuel assemblies manufactured in Romans or Marcoule are transported to French nuclear power plants to be irradiated.

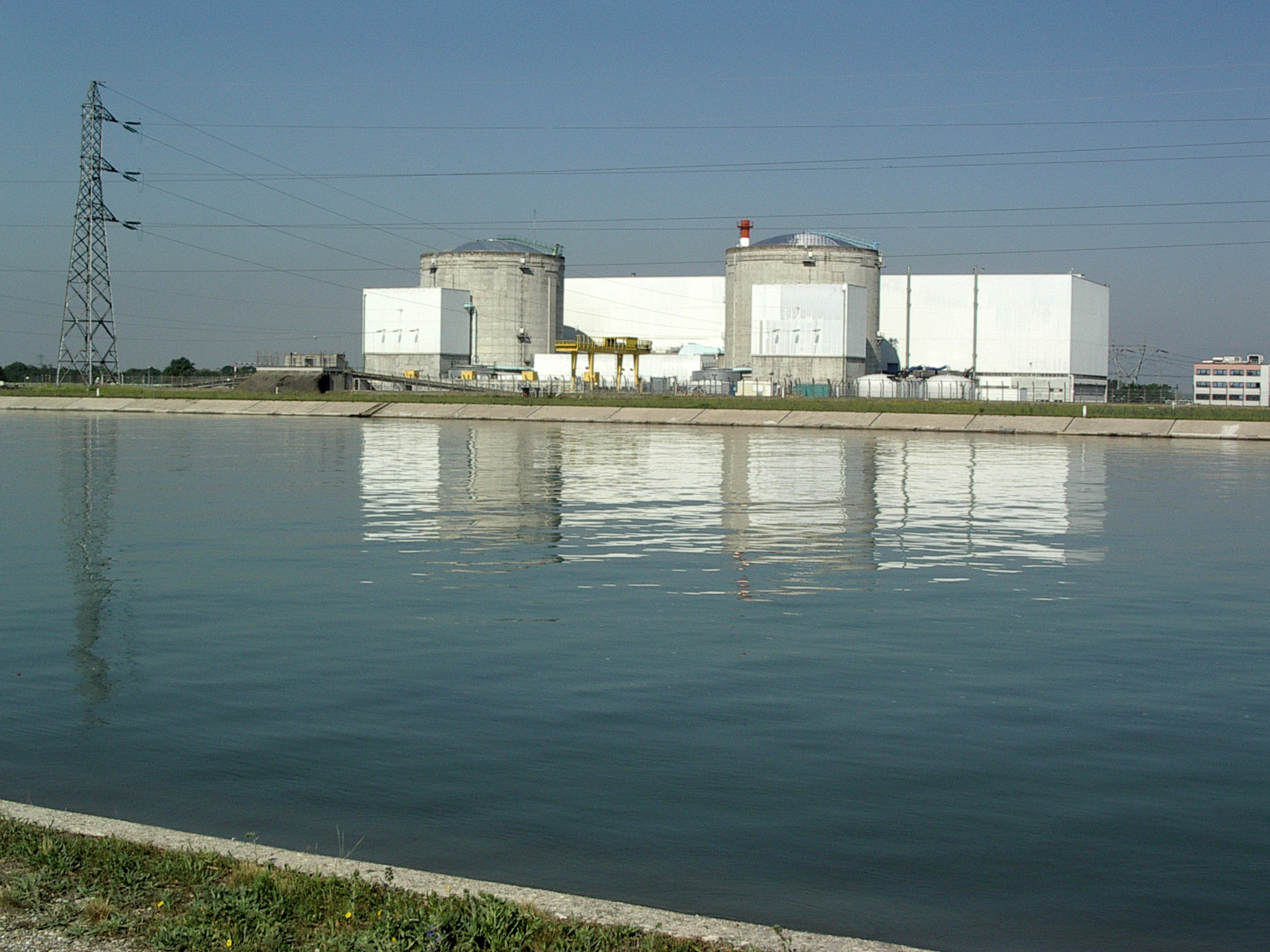
The Fessenheim nuclear power plant, the oldest in the nuclear fleet, before its production was shut down in 2020.

=== Reactors ===
Fuel assemblies are irradiated in various civil or military reactors to produce electricity, or in research reactors to produce various isotopes for the industrial and medical sectors.

In 2020, France will have 18 nuclear power plants in operation, for a total of 56 nuclear power reactors. Each of these plants comprises two or four reactors, except the Gravelines plant (Nord), which has six. These reactors are pressurized water reactors. The 56-reactor fleet comprises 32 900 MWe reactors, 20 1,300 MWe reactors, and 4 1,450 MWe reactors. A lower-power fast reactor was also in operation (connected to the grid) at the Marcoule site until September 2009. A Generation III PWR reactor, known as the EPR for “European Pressurized Reactor,” is due to come on stream around 2023 alongside the two existing reactors at the Flamanville nuclear power plant (Manche).

=== Burn-in time ===
Fuel assemblies remain in the core of each reactor for around three years. As the fuel burns, it is depleted in fissile elements and enriched in fission products, some of which act as poisons, slowing down fission reactions. After three years, it becomes necessary to replace the fuel that was spent with new fuel. To avoid shutting down the reactor for too long, the replacement operation is not carried out all at once, but every year in thirds.

The reactor is shut down, the primary circuit depressurized, and the vessel opened. Once the core has been extracted, the assemblies are stored in the reactor pool and then in the plant's storage pool, which is also used to store new fuel. They remain in the storage pool for at least a year to reduce radioactivity, particularly that of the extremely radioactive short-lived elements. These pools have a characteristic blue color due to flashes resulting from the emission of certain faster-than-light beta electrons into the water; this phenomenon is known as the Vavilov-Cherenkov effect.

=== Spent fuel composition ===
Composition of nuclear fuel before and after 3 years of irradiation.

After three years of irradiation, the fuel has been transformed into plutonium, fission products, and minor actinides. The composition of irradiated fuel extracted from a reactor core depends on the initial quantity of fissile material and the energy extracted from it.

When introduced into the core, uranium oxide fuel contains fissile uranium 235, which in pressurized water reactors averages 3.5%, the remainder being uranium 238. It is this uranium 235 that gives rise to the fission reaction and energy production. However, after three years of irradiation, not all of it is consumed: for one ton of fuel irradiated in a conventional PWR with an electrical output of 1 gigawatt, out of 33 kg of uranium 235 at the start, 10.3 kg remains after irradiation. This leaves around 1% fissile 235 isotopes, more than in natural uranium (0.7%), and it may be worth enriching this spent uranium for recycling.

The fertile uranium 238 isotope initially represents 96.7% of the total. During irradiation, uranium 238 is partly transformed by the capture of a thermal neutron into unstable uranium 239, which emits neptunium with a very short half-life, which in turn transforms into plutonium 239. This in turn can capture a thermal neutron as it undergoes fission under the action of fast neutrons, and so on, with several plutonium isotopes eventually coexisting. For one ton of fuel, 967 kg of uranium 238 are present at the start, 941 kg after irradiation, and 9.74 kg of plutonium (0.18 kg of Pu238, 5.67 kg of Pu239, 2.21 kg of Pu240, 1.19 kg of Pu241 and 0.49 kg of Pu242).

Fission products result from the fission of uranium 235 and plutonium formed during irradiation. Some of the fission products are stable when the reactor is unloaded, but the rest are highly radioactive. The initial ton of fuel contained 34.1 kg of fission products, 31.1 of which were short- and medium-lived, and 3 long-lived, including 0.81 kg of technetium 99, 0.17 kg of iodine 129, 1.31 kg of cesium 135 and 0.71 kg of zirconium 93.

Actinides are elements whose nuclei are heavier than uranium. They are produced when uranium captures one or more neutrons without fissioning. In addition to plutonium, less abundant minor actinides are produced, totaling around 800 grams per ton of fuel: 0.43 kg neptunium 237, 0.22 kg americium 241, and a tiny amount of curium.

== Recycling ==
=== Spent fuel transport ===
The irradiated assemblies are transported to the Hague reprocessing plant to be reprocessed or temporarily stored.

After one year, the activity of the fuel has fallen to around two million curies per ton. Despite this high level of activity, the fuel can now be transported to the La Hague reprocessing plant, as its handling has been robotized. Of all transports of radioactive materials, the transport of spent fuel to the La Hague plant is the most dangerous. Nuclear medicine products, which account for 90% of all shipments, are not very radioactive. The same applies to products recycled after processing at La Hague. However, this is not the case for spent fuel, which is simply stored for a year in a deactivation pool.

Fuel assemblies are transported in steel canisters, each containing twelve 500 kg assemblies, under dry conditions. These containers are highly resistant and form a containment barrier thanks to their thick walls, which prevent the spread of radioactive materials and enable the fuel element to be transported by road or rail.

These casks destined for La Hague are Class B packages, according to the classification for the transport of nuclear materials. As such, they must be able to withstand impacts at 50 km/h (9 m drop) on a non-deformable surface, withstand a fall from a height of one meter, withstand a fire at 800°C for 30 minutes, and resist immersion up to 200 m for the most radioactive packages.

Almost all irradiated fuel for reprocessing is transported by rail to the Valognes rail terminal, then by road to the La Hague plant. On arrival, the flask containing the irradiated fuel elements is unloaded. The fuel elements are deposited in one of the deactivation pools, where they will wait for several more years before being reprocessed.

=== Reprocessing at La Hague ===
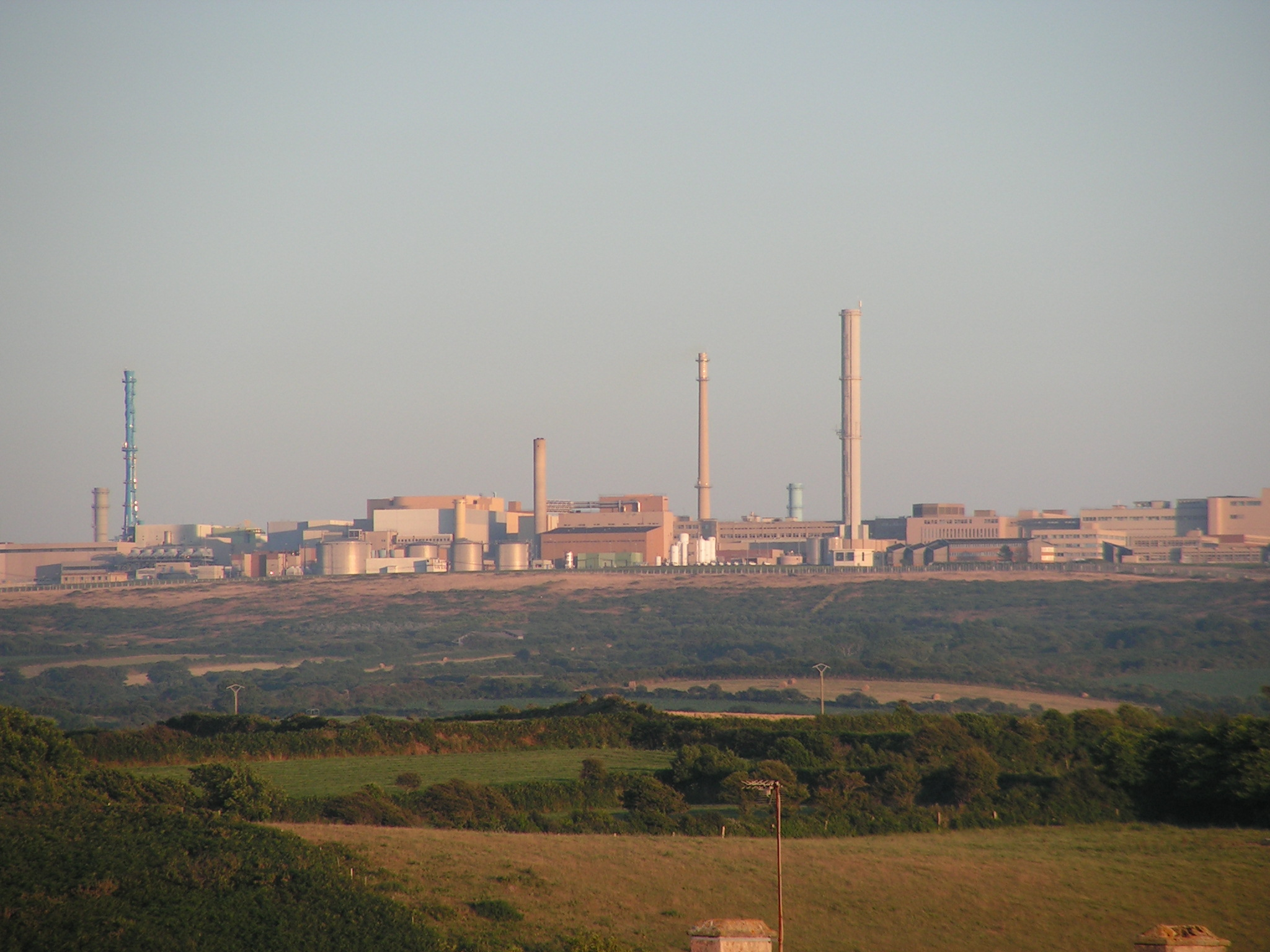
La Hague reprocessing plant.

The La Hague reprocessing plant receives fuel assemblies from various nuclear reactors and transforms them using a variety of processes to isolate the materials that can be reused in the fuel, such as uranium or plutonium, from materials containing fission products emitting beta and gamma rays and minor actinides (neptunium, americium, and curium), which are treated as waste and undergo specific conditioning before final storage. The aqueous treatment process used is known as PUREX (Plutonium Uranium Refining by Extraction).

On arrival at the plant, the assemblies are removed from their steel containers, underwater and with the aid of a robot, given their high level of radioactivity. They are then stored in baskets at the bottom of one of the plant's five pools. Each pool is at least 9 m deep, to limit radioactivity given that each assembly is 4.50 m long. The baskets are made of boron-coated steel to avoid any risk of criticality. The assemblies will remain there for three to five years, to reduce radioactivity sufficiently for subsequent stages.

After this period, the assemblies are dismantled. The end fittings are first separated, then a large guillotine shears the rod bundles into 35 mm-long sections. The sheath fragments and shells with their contents fall into a bath of boiling nitric acid. The pieces of metal structure (cladding, shells), insoluble in the acid, are evacuated by a bucket wheel to a conditioning unit, to be treated as “type B” waste.

The nitric acid solution, freed of insoluble products and containing recyclable products, is then sent to a chemical separation plant. In a set of mixer settlers and pulsed columns, a solvent (tributylphosphate) carries away the heavy elements (uranium and plutonium) without extracting the fission products. All these actions are automated, given the high level of radioactivity.

The uranium is purified by separation in a series of mixer-settlers in two successive cycles (extraction and re-extraction). The uranium solutions are then concentrated by evaporation into liquid form, to obtain uranyl nitrate, which can then be stored for processing in a specialized plant at the Tricastin nuclear site.

The plutonium is converted by calcination in a furnace into plutonium dioxide powder, which is then packaged in stainless steel cans weighing around 3 kg each, in batches of five. The French plutonium is then shipped to the Melox fuel fabrication plant at Marcoule.

The first processing unit (UP_{2}) went into industrial operation in 1966. A pilot workshop for fast neutron fuel processing operated from 1969 to 1979, and has now been dismantled. To meet growing processing needs, Cogema was authorized to build a new processing plant (UP_{3}-A), with an annual capacity of around 800 tons of light-water spent fuel, which increased in 2003 to 1,000 tons per year, with a limit of 1,700 tons per year for all facilities. This plant went into service in 1990. A second plant with the same purpose and capacity (UP_{2}-800) came on stream in 1994. The first (UP_{2}-400) was shut down in 2003. The following quantities of fuel have been processed since 1966.

Produit	1966	1970	1975	1980	1985	1990	1995	2000	2006	2007	2008	2009
Usine UP_{2}	57	237	441	356	460	331	758	850	617	458	299	243
Usine UP_{3}	0	0	0	0	0	195	801	342	698	490	638	686
Total	57	237	441	356	460	526	1559	1192	1015	948	937	929

=== Downstream conversion at Tricastin ===
Areva NC's TU 5 plant at the Tricastin nuclear site, authorized by decree on July 7, 1992, and commissioned in 1996, converts uranyl nitrate from irradiated fuel processed at Areva's La Hague plant into uranium tetrafluoride (UF_{4}) or double salt (UF_{4} NH_{4} F), then oxidizes to uranium sesquioxide (U_{3}O_{8}). This takes the form of a grey-black powder with a density of around 1.75, stable up to 1,300°C, non-combustible, non-corrosive and insoluble. It is packaged in 220-liter blue metal containers, with an average capacity of around 250 kg of uranium.

=== Use of reprocessed uranium ===
Reprocessed uranium contains around 1% uranium 235, and its isotopic composition is more complex, with the presence of uranium 234 in particular.

The Malvési site in the Aude region of France carried out UF_{4} fluorination campaigns on reprocessed uranium from the Marcoule site between 1960 and 1983.

=== Recycling rate and uranium saved ===
In the public perception, there has always been confusion between reprocessing and recycling on the one hand, and between “recyclable” and “actually recycled” on the other. According to some associations, this confusion is skillfully maintained by the main recycling operator. In Areva's 2009 reference report, for example, we read: “Recycling (or closed cycle) takes into account the fact that spent fuel contains a significant quantity of reusable material capable of producing a large amount of energy. 96% of the material is recyclable (95% uranium and 1% plutonium). On leaving the reactor, the spent fuel is processed to separate the recoverable materials, uranium and plutonium, from the final waste (4%). The recovered uranium and plutonium are recycled into new fuel in the form of MOX (a mixture of plutonium and depleted uranium) and enriched reprocessed uranium.” While all the statements taken separately are true (96% of the material is recyclable, and uranium and plutonium are recycled), the conclusion the user might draw on first reading is false: 96% of the material is not recycled, or even reprocessed. It had to wait for the Parliamentary Office for the Evaluation of Scientific and Technological Choices to hear from EDF, ASN, IRSN, CEA, and Areva officials on this subject, and above all for the publication in July 2010 of the opinion of the French High Committee for Transparency and Information on Nuclear Safety (HCTISN) on the transparency of the management of nuclear materials and waste produced at the various stages of the fuel cycle, to find out the true flows of materials and waste, and therefore the rates of reprocessing and recycling.

In average annual flows over the years 2007, 2008, and 2009, 8,100 tons of natural uranium were enriched to produce 1,033 tons of enriched uranium, which was used to manufacture fuel for France's 59 reactors (58 today), and 7,330 tons of depleted uranium. Of these 1,033 tons of new fuel, 850 tons were reprocessed after 3 years in the reactor. Areva extracted 8.5 tons of plutonium (used to manufacture Mox fuel) and 800 tons of reprocessed uranium. The remainder is final waste.

Of the 800 tons of reprocessed uranium, 300 tons are sent to Tomsk in Russia for re-enrichment, while the remaining 500 tons are added to the “strategic stock” every year. After processing, Russia returns 37 tons of enriched reprocessed uranium (ERU) and keeps the remaining 273 tons of depleted reprocessed uranium.

The quantity of recycled material is thus 37 (ERU) + 8.5 (Pu) = 45.5 tons. As the annual tonnage of spent fuel discharged is 1170, the recycling rate is therefore 3.9% (45.5/1170), which is a long way from the 96% that can be recycled.

If we add the 91.5 tons of depleted uranium reused to manufacture Mox, we obtain 137 tons of uranium saved. The rate of uranium saved is therefore 11.7% (137/1170). According to the HCTISN, this rate should rise from 12% to 17% by 2010.

=== Multi-recycling in PWRs ===
The French R&D program on Multirecycling in PWRs (MRREP), organized by CEA, EDF, Framatome, and Orano as part of the French nuclear industry's Strategic Contract 2019-2022, involves studying the benefits of recycling plutonium from the processing of spent MOX assemblies in PWRs; several “MOX 2” fuel concepts are envisaged. The aim is to increase the proportion of recycled materials in French reactors from 20% to 40% and to reduce stocks of materials and waste from spent fuel. This program is a transitional cycle preparing the closure of the cycle with the deployment of Fast-neutron reactor (FBNRs).

== Waste management ==
Low and medium-level waste is sent to the Soulaines storage center, and very low-level waste to the Morvilliers storage center (Aube).

According to the IAEA definition, radioactive waste is “any material for which no use is foreseen, and which contains radionuclides in concentrations exceeding the values that the competent authorities consider acceptable in materials suitable for uncontrolled use.” In France, radioactive waste is radioactive material that cannot be reused or reprocessed (under current technical and economic conditions).

The electronuclear program is not the only one to produce radioactive waste. In terms of volume, it generates just under two-thirds (62%), but it accounts for most of the activity. The remainder comes from research services (17%), the national defense sector (17%), the non-electronuclear industry (3.5%), and the medical sector (1%).

The French national radioactive waste management agency (Andra) designs and operates storage facilities for each category of radioactive waste. This involves waste collection, conditioning, storage, and monitoring. Since the law of June 28, 2006, Andra has also been responsible for long-term storage. The management of radioactive waste and materials is the subject of a national plan reviewed every three years: the National Radioactive Waste and Materials Management Plan (PNGMDR). This plan defines the French classification of radioactive waste, based on two key parameters for defining the appropriate management method: the activity level of the radioactive elements contained, and their half-life (referred to as short-lived or long-lived, with a cut-off point of 30 years).

	Very Short-Lived (VSL) Radioactive half-life <100 days	Short-Lived (SL) Radioactive half-life ≤ 31 years	Long-Lived (LL) Radioactive half-life > 31 years
Very Low Activity (VLA)	VSL Waste; Managed on-site through radioactive decay. They are then treated as conventional waste.	VLA Waste; Stored at the surface in the VLA Storage Center in Aube.	
Low Activity (LA)	VSL Waste; Managed on-site through radioactive decay. They are then treated as conventional waste.	FMA-SL Waste; Stored at the surface in the FMA Storage Center in Aube, which replaced the Manche Storage Center, now closed and under surveillance.	FA-LL Waste; Shallow storage center (between 15 and 200 m) under study. Scheduled for commissioning in 2019.
Intermediate Activity (IA)	VSL Waste; Managed on-site through radioactive decay. They are then treated as conventional waste.	FMA-SL Waste; Stored at the surface in the FMA Storage Center in Aube, which replaced the Manche Storage Center, now closed and under surveillance.	IA-LL Waste; Deep storage center (at 500 m) under study. Scheduled for commissioning in 2025.
High Activity (HA)	VSL Waste; Managed on-site through radioactive decay. They are then treated as conventional waste.	HL Waste; Deep storage center (at 500 m) under study. Scheduled for commissioning in 2025.	

The vast majority of nuclear waste in France is low- to medium-level short-lived waste (792,625 m^{3} on December 31, 2007, or 69%). This represents 0.0276% of total radioactivity. These are mainly objects and tools used in the operation of nuclear facilities that have been contaminated to a greater or lesser extent by the radioelements with which they have come into contact (protective clothing, gloves, etc.), and those used in the operation of nuclear facilities (treatment of liquid effluent or filtration of gaseous effluent). Since 1992, they have been stored above ground, in the Aube region, at the Centre de stockage des déchets de faible et moyenne activité (CSFMA, or Low- and medium-level waste storage facility), which took over from the Manche storage centre (CSM), closed in 1994.

The volume of very low-level waste (VLLW) in storage on December 31, 2007, was 231,688 m^{3}, or 20.1% of the total, representing an insignificant level of radioactivity. Since August 2003, this waste has been stored at the Morvilliers facility in the Aube region, near the CSFMA plant.

MA-VL waste represented a volume of 41,757 m^{3}, i.e. 3.6% of the total volume and 4.98% of total radioactivity. FA-VL waste represented a volume of 82,536 m^{3}, i.e. 7.2% of total volume and 0.0087% of total radioactivity.

High-level waste (HLW) is by far the biggest problem facing the nuclear industry. It is made up of fission products such as cesium, strontium, and iodine, which have a relatively short lifespan, as well as minor actinides (produced in small quantities) (isotopes of neptunium, americium, and curium), whose lifespan can be counted in thousands of years. On December 31, 2007, the accumulated volume was 2,293 m^{3}. This is equivalent to a cube just over 13 meters on a side, or the volume of an Olympic-size swimming pool. So, even if the future storage center has to be vast in size, as there have to be spaces between the containers of waste that generate heat due to its high radioactivity, the overall footprint will remain limited. The waste, consisting of vitrified boulders enclosed in steel containers, will be stored in a deep repository, the site and conditions of which have yet to be specified. Since the main enemy is water, which is liable to attack the steel of the containers and then the glass, a geological layer with very low permeability will be chosen. Studies are being carried out by Andra, which operates the Meuse/Haute-Marne underground research laboratory. The law of June 28, 2006 calls for the project to be submitted to Parliament in 2015 and, subject to its approval, for the repository to be opened in 2025.

== The 2007-2017 cycle and the outlook to 2030 ==
=== Impact of the 2007 cycle ===
To ensure the overall coherence of operations carried out within the French fuel cycle, a formalized approach to studying the functioning of this cycle, embodied in a file known as the “cycle file,” was put in place at the end of the 1990s. This dossier is regularly updated in a process overseen by EDF and involving all cycle operators (EDF, Areva, Andra, etc.). The penultimate version, entitled “Cycle 2000,” was reviewed in 2002. The latest update of this dossier, entitled “Impact Cycle 2007,” was communicated by EDF to the ASN and all stakeholders on November 28, 2008. The IRSN issued its opinion on June 30, 2010, and the ASN on May 9, 2011.

The dossier presents a material balance based on four scenarios which, for a single annual production level of 430 TWh, correspond to two envelope fuel processing tonnages (850 tML then 1050 tML from 2008) and may or may not involve the application of forward-looking management measures.

ASN notes that this value of 430 TWh corresponds to a peak in nuclear power generation, which was reached in 2004. Since then, this level has fallen steadily. It, therefore, requests that a new study be produced within a year, taking into account the greater variability of nuclear power generation (400 ± 40 TWh), and in particular a situation of lower and longer-lasting consumption.

IRSN also considers that the overall capacity available in spent fuel storage pools at EDF reactors and AREVA's La Hague facility is low, and could prove insufficient by 2017-2019.

ASN considers that it is essential to learn the lessons from the Fukushima nuclear accident, and in particular that special attention must be paid to spent fuel storage pools. It, therefore, asks EDF to submit a study within a year “specifying the criteria likely to support or modify its strategy for spent fuel management and storage, and assessing the current availability of ‘underwater’ spent fuel storage.”

=== Material balance 2020-2030 ===
The tables below show the material balance according to one of the four scenarios of the 2007 cycle. They have been drawn up based on the following assumptions:

- 59 existing or “committed” nuclear power reactors: 58 existing PWR reactors and 1 EPR reactor (Flamanville EPR) from 2013;
- All these reactors have the same operating life of 40 years, except for the EPR currently under construction (60 years);
- Nuclear power generation is 430 TWh net/year, plus 13 TWh/year from 2013 (launch postponed until 2023), when the Flamanville EPR is commissioned;
- Fuel loading/unloading in reactors is 1,100 tML/year (around 1,000 tML of UOX and 100 tML of MOX distributed across the 22 reactors authorized at the end of 2007), plus 70 tML/year of URE from 2010 (loading/unloading of 4 URE reactors);
- Prospective management (High Burnup Rate [HBR]) is implemented;
- The six UNGG reactors (Bugey 1, Chinon A1, A2, A3, Saint-Laurent A1, A2), the heavy-water reactor at Brennilis, the PWR reactor at Chooz A, and the fast-neutron reactor at Creys-Malville (Superphénix) will be more than 80% dismantled by the end of 2030 (the dismantling program ends in 2035);
- The spent fuel processing flow at the La Hague plant is 850 tML of UOX/year until 2030. The processing of MOX fuel mixed with LEU and enriched uranium (ERU) is assumed to start in 2031;
- The shutdown fuel processing plants UP1 at Marcoule and UP2-400 at La Hague will be cleaned up and dismantled by the end of 2030.

Evolution of Fuel from 2007 to 2030 In metric tons of heavy metal (tHM)
Fuel Type		End of 2007	End of 2020	End of 2030
Natural uranium extracted from mines (in tHM)		27,613	32,013	32,013
Enriched uranium (in tHM)		3,306	1,764	2,714
Uranium recovered from spent fuel after reprocessing (URT) (tHM)		21,180	36,000	49,000
Depleted uranium (tHM)		254,820	332,324	452,324
Thorium (t) (Note: Thorium comes from the Rhodia Electronics & Catalysis plant, which mined the rare earth ore monazite from 1970 to 1994. It comes in the form of thorium hydroxide or thorium nitrate.)		9,399	9,399	9,290
Suspended solids (t)		21,672	0	0
Fuel currently in use in nuclear power plants and research reactors (tHM)	UOX	4,500	3,860	1,100
Fuel currently in use in nuclear power plants and research reactors (tHM)	URE	80	290	0
Fuel currently in use in nuclear power plants and research reactors (tHM)	MOX	290	440	0
Fuel currently in use in nuclear power plants and research reactors (tHM)	Research	5	0	
Spent fuel awaiting reprocessing	UOX	11,504	13,450	11,000
Spent fuel awaiting reprocessing	URE	251	1,020	1,320
Spent fuel awaiting reprocessing	MOX	1,028	2,320	2,550
Spent fuel awaiting reprocessing	FNR (Fast Neutron Reactor)	104	104	104
Spent fuel awaiting reprocessing	Experimental fuel	42	0	0
Spent fuel awaiting reprocessing	Defense-related fuel	141	230	298
Plutonium recovered from spent fuel after reprocessing (tHM) (Note: The stock of plutonium used in military activities is covered by defense secrecy. Of the 82 tons identified, 60 tons are French-owned. Of these 60 tons, EDF's stock of separated Pu at La Hague corresponds to around 29 tons, equivalent to 3 years' MOX fuel production.)		82	55	53

Evolution of Waste Stock from 2007 to 2030 (In cubic meters of conditioned waste)
Type of Waste Volume	End of 2007	End of 2020	End of 2030
VLA (Very Low Activity)	231,688	629,217	869,311
LIL-SL (Low and Intermediate Level, Short-Lived)	792,695	1,009,675	1,174,193
LL-IL (Long-Lived, Intermediate Level)	82,536	114,592	151,876
LL-ML (Long-Lived, Medium Level)	41,757	46,979	51,009
HLW (High-Level Waste)	2,293	3,679	5,060
Total Waste	1,150,969	1,804,142	2,251,449

== See also ==
- Nuclear fuel cycle
- Nuclear reactors
- Nuclear waste management in France
- Électricité de France
- Uranium mining
- Enriched uranium#Enrichment methods
- Uranium mining in France

== Bibliography ==
- International Atomic Energy Agency (IAEA); OECD (2010). Uranium 2009 Ressources, production et demande: Ressources, production et demande. OECD Publishing. p. 500. ISBN 9789264088900.
- Delhaye, Jean-Marc (2008). Thermohydraulique des réacteurs nucléaires [Thermal hydraulics of nuclear reactors] (PDF) (in French). EDP sciences. p. 208. ISBN 978-2-86883-823-0.
- Patarin, Louis (2002). Le cycle du combustible nucléaire [The nuclear fuel cycle] (PDF) (in French). EDP sciences. p. 224. ISBN 2-86883-620-8.
- DIANE Publishing Company (1995). Spent Nuclear Fuel Discharges from U. S. Reactors (1993). Diane Publishing. p. 240. ISBN 9780788120701.
- Sorin, Francis (2009). Le nucléaire et la planète : Dix clés pour comprendre [Nuclear power and the planet: Ten keys to understanding] (in French). Paris: Grancher. p. 308. ISBN 9782733910894.
- Michel, Michel (1978). "L'extraction de l'uranium" [Uranium mining]. Annales de Géographie (in French). 87 (482): 398–434. doi:10.3406/geo.1978.17907.
- Haut Comité pour la Transparence et l’Information sur la sécurité nucléaire (2011). "Les étapes du cycle du combustible dans lesquelles intervient Areva" [The stages of the fuel cycle in which Areva is involved] (PDF). hctisn.fr (in French).
- Areva (2004). "Débat public sur la construction de l'usine Georges Besse II - Dossier du maître d'ouvrage" [Public debate on the construction of the Georges Besse II factory - Project owner's file] (PDF). cpdp.debatpublic.fr (in French).
- Rouy, Emmanuel (2000). "L'ATPu (Atelier de Technologie du Plutonium) à Cadarache" [ATPu (Plutonium Technology Workshop) in Cadarache] (PDF). wise-paris.org (in French).
- Areva (2009). "Areva - Document de référence 2009" [Areva - 2009 Reference Document] (PDF). info-financiere.fr (in French).
- Andra (2009). "Inventaire national des matières et déchets radioactifs - Rapport de synthèse 2009" [National inventory of radioactive materials and waste - Summary report 2009] (PDF). andra.fr (in French).
- Haut Comité pour la Transparence et l’Information sur la sécurité nucléaire (2010). "Avis sur la transparence de la gestion des matières et des déchets nucléaires produits aux différents stades du cycle du combustible" [Opinion on the transparency of the management of nuclear materials and waste produced at the different stages of the fuel cycle] (PDF). hctisn.fr (in French).
