= Lachaux =

- Commune
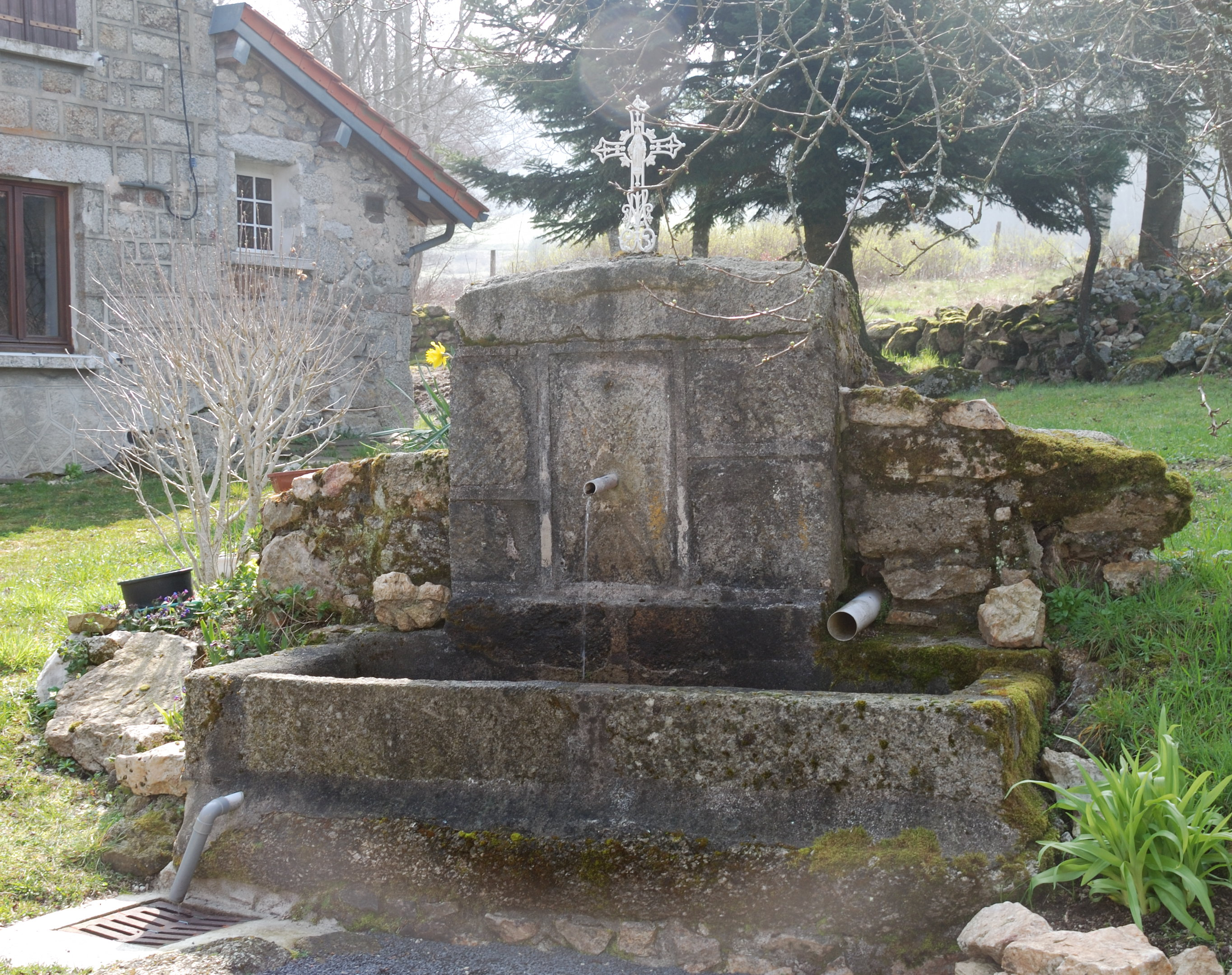
- Fountain at Plan James hamlet of Lachaux

- Coat of arms
- Location of Lachaux
- Location within France Location within Auvergne-Rhône-Alpes
- Coordinates: 45°59′41″N 3°35′37″E
- Country: France
- Region: Auvergne-Rhône-Alpes
- Department: Puy-de-Dôme
- Arrondissement: Thiers
- Canton: Maringues

Government
  - Mayor (2020–2026): Michel Couperier
- Area^{1}: 22.27 km^{2} (8.60 sq mi)
- Elevation: 600 m (2,000 ft)
- Highest elevation: 947 m (3,107 ft)
- Lowest elevation: 417 m (1,368 ft)
- Population (2023): 273
  - Density: 12.3/km^{2} (31.7/sq mi)
- Time zone: UTC+01:00 (CET)
  - Summer (DST): UTC+02:00 (CEST)
- INSEE/Postal code: 63184 /63290
- ^{1} French Land Register data, which excludes lakes, ponds, glaciers > 1 km^{2} (0.386 sq mi or 247 acres) and river estuaries.

Lachaux (French pronunciation: [laʃo]) is a commune in the Puy-de-Dôme department in Auvergne in central France.

== See also ==
- Communes of the Puy-de-Dôme department
