= Grury =

- Commune
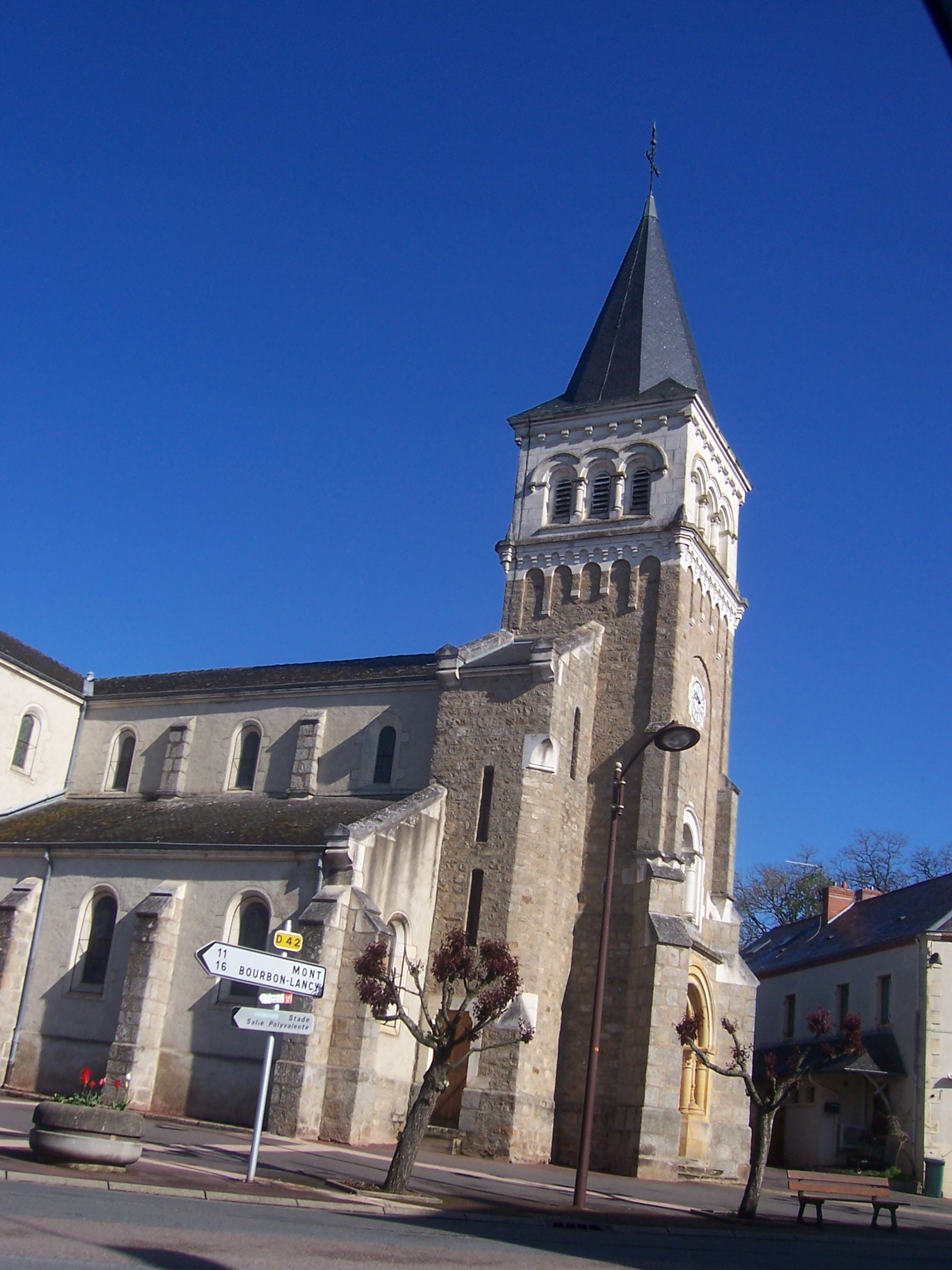
- The church in Grury
- Location of Grury
- Location within France Location within Bourgogne-Franche-Comté
- Coordinates: 46°40′35″N 3°54′42″E
- Country: France
- Region: Bourgogne-Franche-Comté
- Department: Saône-et-Loire
- Arrondissement: Charolles
- Canton: Gueugnon

Government
  - Mayor (2020–2026): Guillaume Paquier
- Area^{1}: 46.02 km^{2} (17.77 sq mi)
- Elevation: 298 m (978 ft)
- Highest elevation: 422 m (1,385 ft)
- Lowest elevation: 246 m (807 ft)
- Population (2023): 490
  - Density: 11/km^{2} (28/sq mi)
- Time zone: UTC+01:00 (CET)
  - Summer (DST): UTC+02:00 (CEST)
- INSEE/Postal code: 71227 /71760
- ^{1} French Land Register data, which excludes lakes, ponds, glaciers > 1 km^{2} (0.386 sq mi or 247 acres) and river estuaries.

Grury (French pronunciation: [ɡʁyʁi]) is a commune in the Saône-et-Loire department in the region of Bourgogne-Franche-Comté in eastern France.

== See also ==
- Communes of the Saône-et-Loire department
