= Malvési =

Coordinates: 43.21361°N 2.98°E

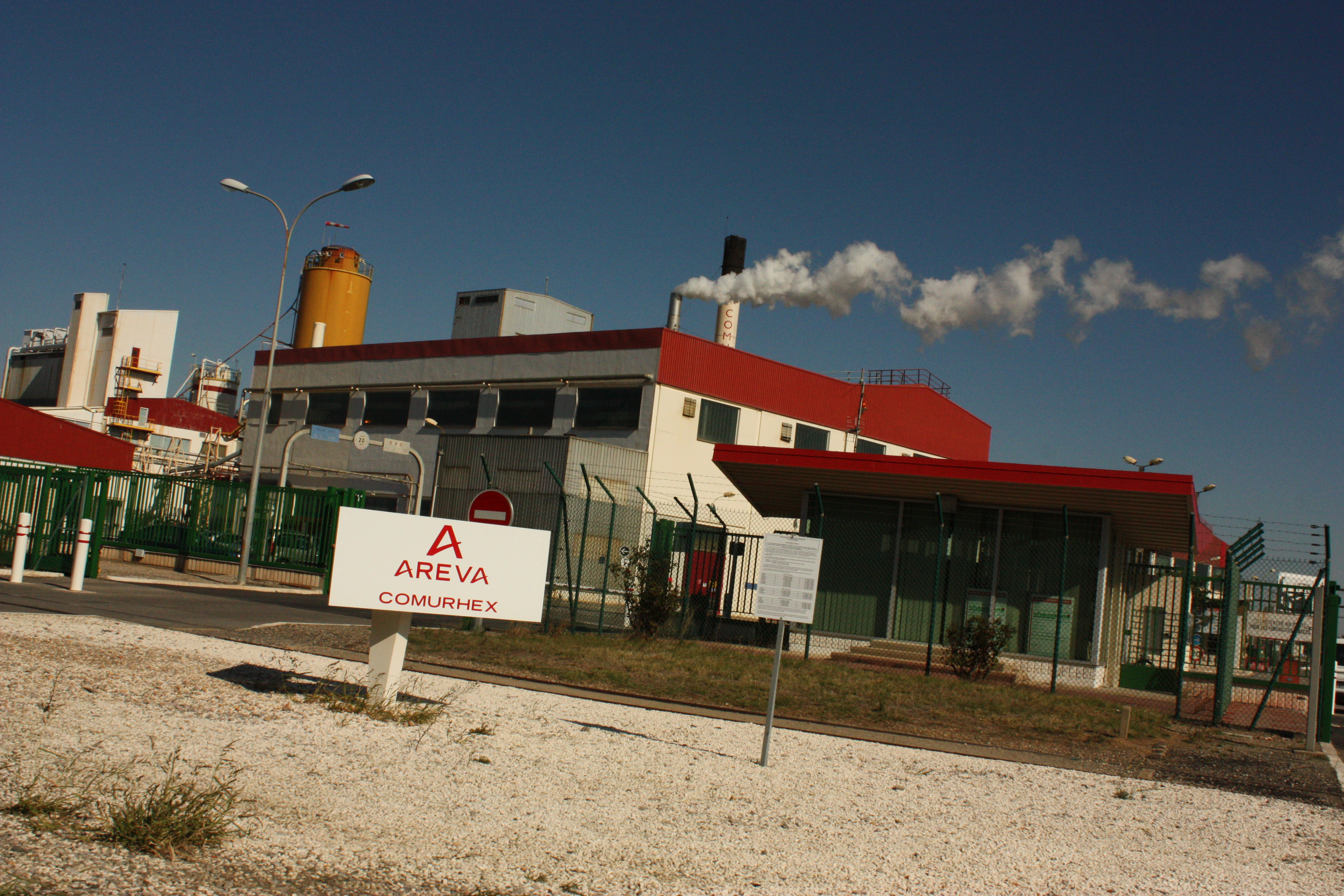

The Malvési uranium processing plant, a uranium refinery and conversion facility, is located in the Malvezy industrial area in the city of Narbonne in the south of France. The plant has an average capacity of about 14,000 tU as uranium tetrafluoride per year, and is projected to increase its capacity up to 21,000 tU per year. Comurhex, a subsidiary of the French nuclear concern Orano, operates the Malvési Facility.

== Gallery ==
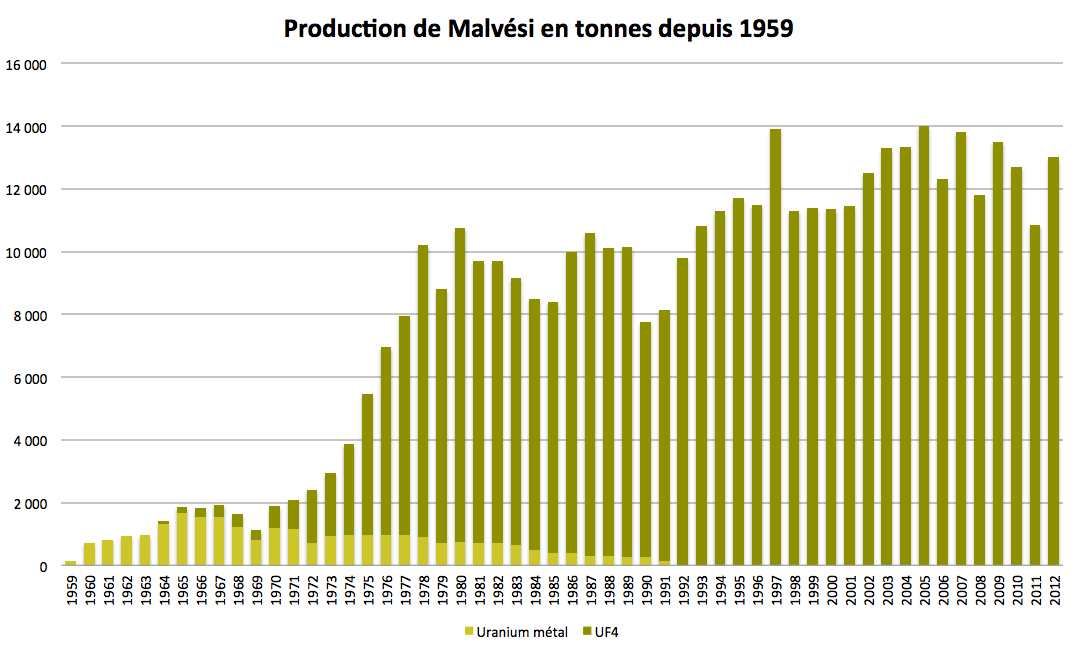
Uranium (UF4) production at Malvesi since 1959

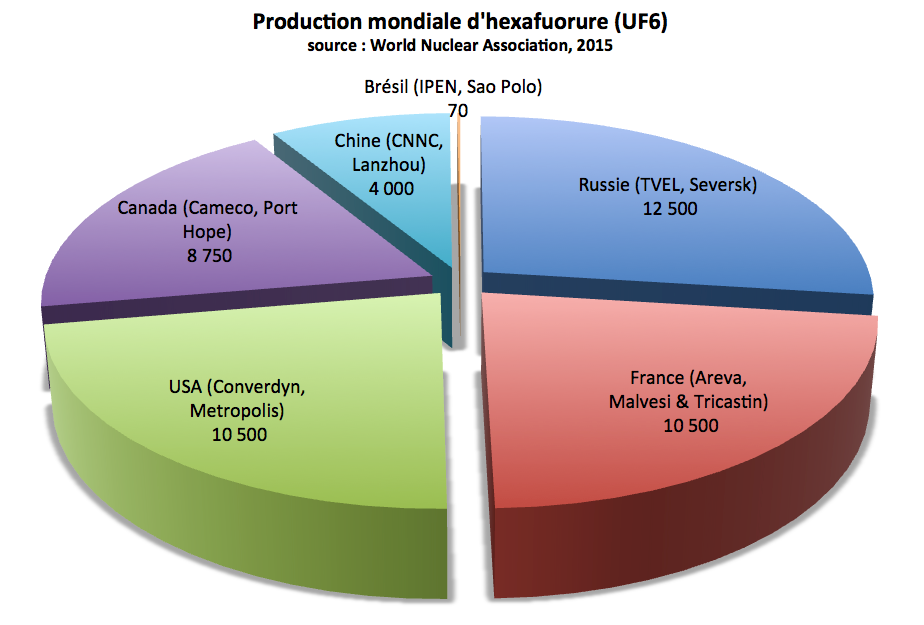
UF6 World production in 2015

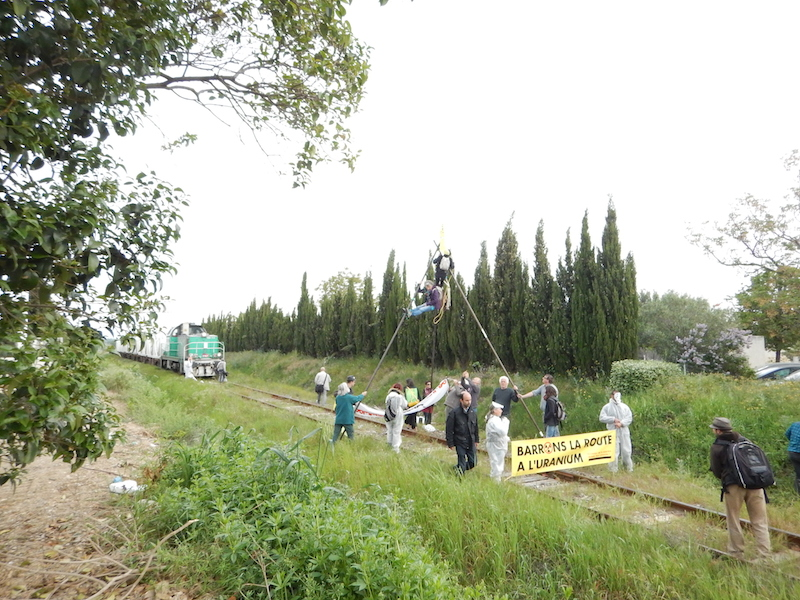
Uranium train blockade in Narbonne in April 2017

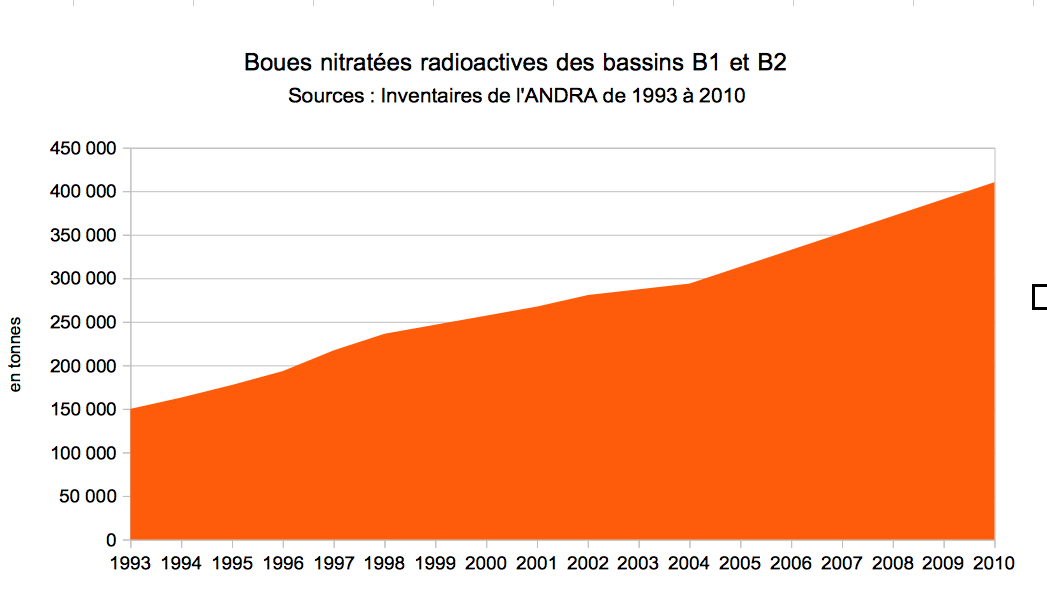
Solid radioactive waste volume produced in Malvesi from 1993 to 2010

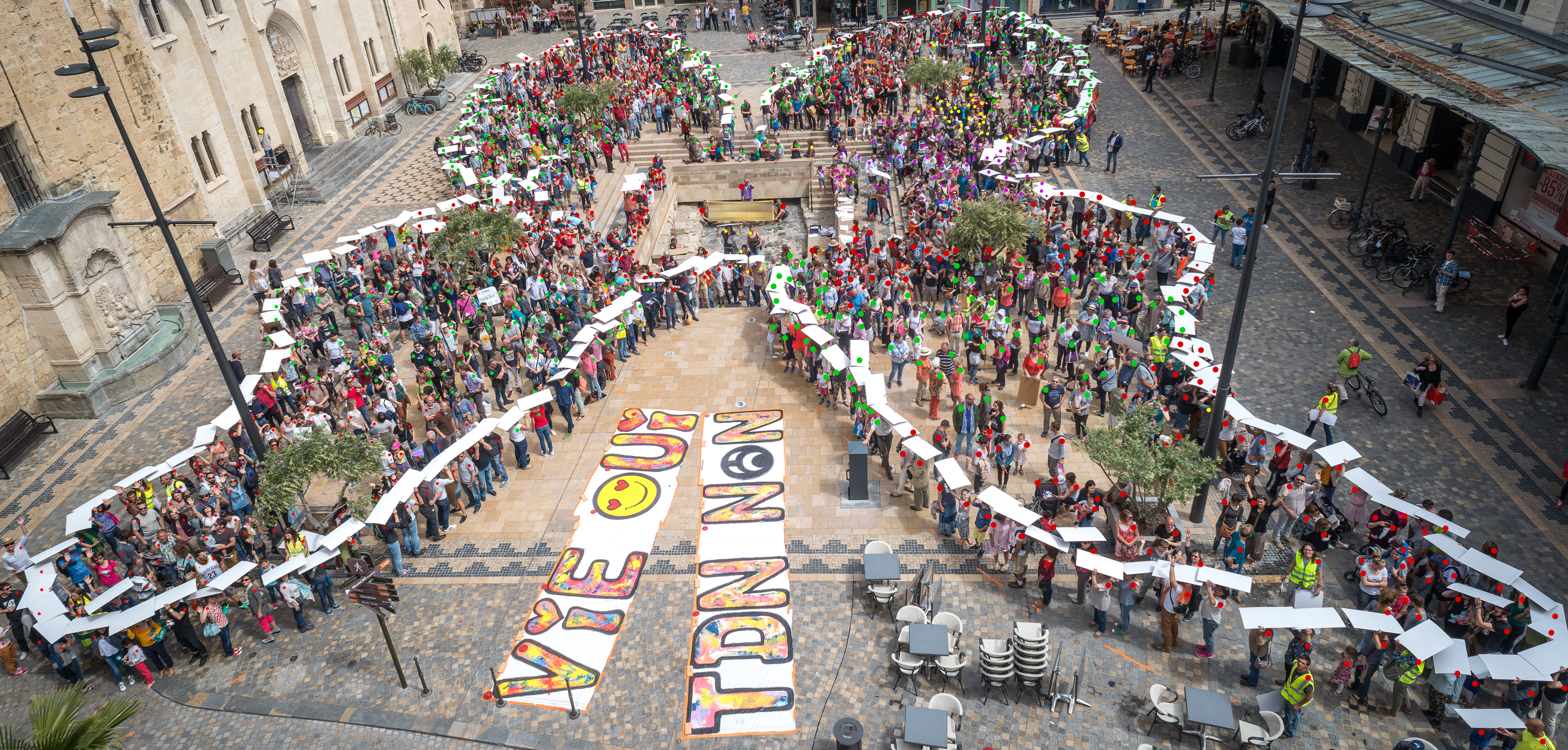
Demonstration in Narbonne center town against Areva Malvesi thermal organic reduction (Thor) process in May 2017

== See also ==
- Tricastin Nuclear Power Plant and its Comurhex Uranium hexafluoride conversion facility
- Honeywell Uranium Hexafluoride Processing Facility
