= Saint-Priest-la-Prugne =

- Commune
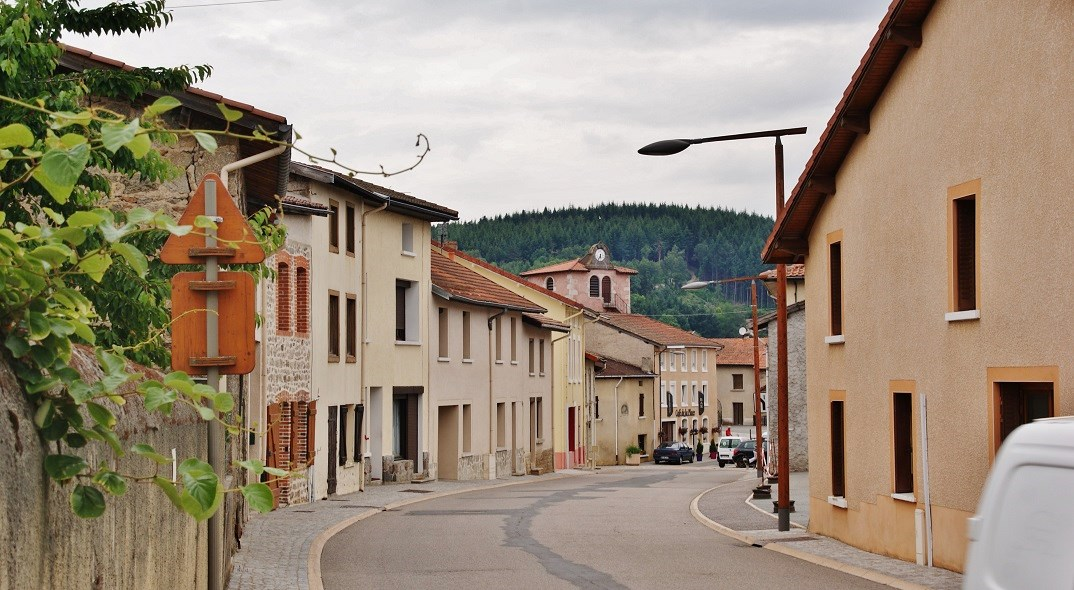

- Coat of arms
- Location of Saint-Priest-la-Prugne
- Location within France Location within Auvergne-Rhône-Alpes
- Coordinates: 45°57′42″N 3°45′02″E
- Country: France
- Region: Auvergne-Rhône-Alpes
- Department: Loire
- Arrondissement: Roanne
- Canton: Renaison
- Intercommunality: Pays d'Urfé

Government
  - Mayor (2020–2026): Dominique Cazorla
- Area^{1}: 36.68 km^{2} (14.16 sq mi)
- Elevation: 756 m (2,480 ft)
- Highest elevation: 1,287 m (4,222 ft)
- Lowest elevation: 610 m (2,000 ft)
- Population (2023): 402
  - Density: 11.0/km^{2} (28.4/sq mi)
- Time zone: UTC+01:00 (CET)
  - Summer (DST): UTC+02:00 (CEST)
- INSEE/Postal code: 42276 /42830
- ^{1} French Land Register data, which excludes lakes, ponds, glaciers > 1 km^{2} (0.386 sq mi or 247 acres) and river estuaries.

Saint-Priest-la-Prugne (French pronunciation: [sɛ̃ pʁijɛ(st) la pʁyɲ]) is a commune in the Loire department in central France.

== Population ==
Historical population
Year	Pop.	±% p.a.
1968	880	—
1975	717	−2.88%
1982	514	−4.64%
1990	505	−0.22%
1999	442	−1.47%
2007	465	+0.64%
2012	448	−0.74%
2017	433	−0.68%
2023	402	−1.23%
Source: INSEE

== See also ==
- Communes of the Loire department
