= Uranate =

Uranium oxyanion associated with a monovalent or divalent cation

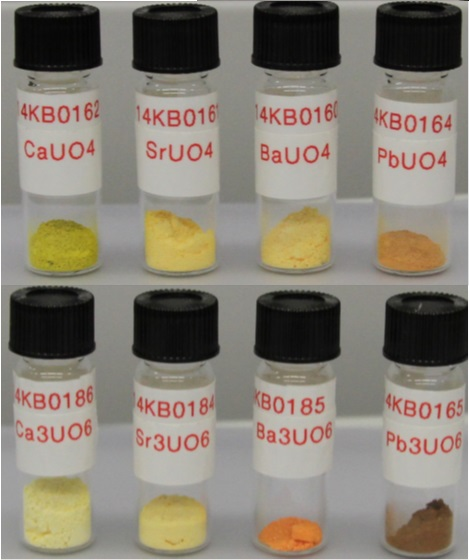
Uranates of calcium, strontium, barium and lead

A uranate is a ternary oxide involving the element uranium in one of the oxidation states 4, 5 or 6. A typical chemical formula is M_{x}U_{y}O_{z}, where M represents a cation. The uranium atom in uranates(VI) has two short collinear U–O bonds and either four or six more next nearest oxygen atoms. The structures are infinite lattice structures with the uranium atoms linked by bridging oxygen atoms.

Uranium oxides are the foundation of the nuclear fuel cycle ("ammonium diuranate" and "sodium diuranate" are intermediates in the production of uranium oxide nuclear fuels) and their long-term geological disposal requires a thorough understanding of their chemical reactivity, phase transitions, and physical and chemical properties.

== Synthesis ==
A method of general applicability involves combining two oxides in a high temperature reaction. For example,

Na_{2}O + UO_{3} → Na_{2}UO_{4}

Another method is the thermal decomposition of a complex, such as an acetate complex. For example, microcrystalline barium diuranate, BaU_{2}O_{7}, was made by thermal decomposition of barium uranyl acetate at 900 °C.

Ba[UO_{2}(ac)_{3}]_{2} → BaU_{2}O_{7} ... (ac=CH_{3}CO_{2}^{−})

Uranates can be prepared by adding alkali to an aqueous solution of a uranyl salt. However, the composition of the precipitate that forms is variable and depends on the chemical and physical conditions used.

Uranates are insoluble in water and other solvents, so pure samples can only be obtained by careful control of reaction conditions.

Formula	U-ox. state	Space group	Symmetry	Formula	U-ox. state	Space group	Symmetry	Formula	U-ox. state	Space group	Symmetry
Li_{2}UO_{4}	VI	α: Fmmm, Pnma β:	orthorhombic hexagonal	BaU_{2}O_{7}	VI	I4_{1}/amd	tetragonal	Sr_{2}UO_{5}	VI	P2_{1}/c	monoclinic
Na_{2}UO_{4}	VI	α: Cmmm β: Pnma	orthorhombic orthorhombic	SrU_{2}O_{7}	VI			Li_{6}UO_{6}	VI		hexagonal
K_{2}UO_{4}	VI	α: I4/mmm β:	tetragonal orthorhombic	CaU_{2}O_{7}	VI			Ca_{3}UO_{6}	VI	P2_{1}	monoclinic
Cs_{2}UO_{4}	VI	I4/mmm	tetragonal	MgU_{3}O_{10}	VI		hexagonal	Sr_{3}UO_{6}	VI	P2_{1}	monoclinic
MgUO_{4}	VI	Imma	orthorhombic	Li_{2}U_{3}O_{10}	VI	α: P2_{1}/c β: P2	monoclinic monoclinic	Ba_{3}UO_{6}	VI	Fm-3m	cubic
CaUO_{4}	VI	R-3m	rhombohedral	SrU_{4}O_{13}	VI		monoclinic	NaUO_{3}	V	Pbnm	orthorhombic
SrUO_{4}	VI	α: R-3m β: Pbcm	rhombohedral orthorhombic	Li_{2}U_{6}O_{19}	VI		orthorhombic	KUO_{3}	V	Pm3m	cubic
BaUO_{4}	VI	Pbcm	orthorhombic	K_{2}U_{7}O_{22}	VI	Pbam	orthorhombic	RbUO_{3}	V	Pm3m	cubic
Li_{2}U_{2}O_{7}	VI		orthorhombic	Rb_{2}U_{7}O_{22}	VI	Pbam	orthorhombic	CaUO_{3}	IV		cubic
Na_{2}U_{2}O_{7}	VI	C2/m	monoclinic	Cs_{2}U_{7}O_{22}	VI	Pbam	orthorhombic	SrUO_{3}	IV		orthorhombic
K_{2}U_{2}O_{7}	VI	R-3m	hexagonal	Li_{4}UO_{5}	VI	I4/m	tetragonal	BaUO_{3}	IV	Pm3m	cubic
Rb_{2}U_{2}O_{7}	VI	R-3m	hexagonal	Na_{4}UO_{5}	VI	I4/m	tetragonal	Li_{3}UO_{4}	V		tetragonal
Cs_{2}U_{2}O_{7}	VI	α: C2/m β: C2/m γ: P6/mmc	monoclinic monoclinic hexagonal	Ca_{2}UO_{5}	VI	P2_{1}/c	monoclinic	Na_{3}UO_{4}	V	Fm-3m	cubic

== Uranium(VI) ==
=== Structures ===
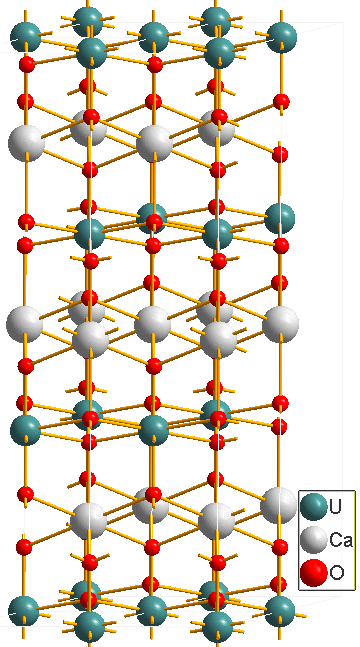
CaUO_{4} structure

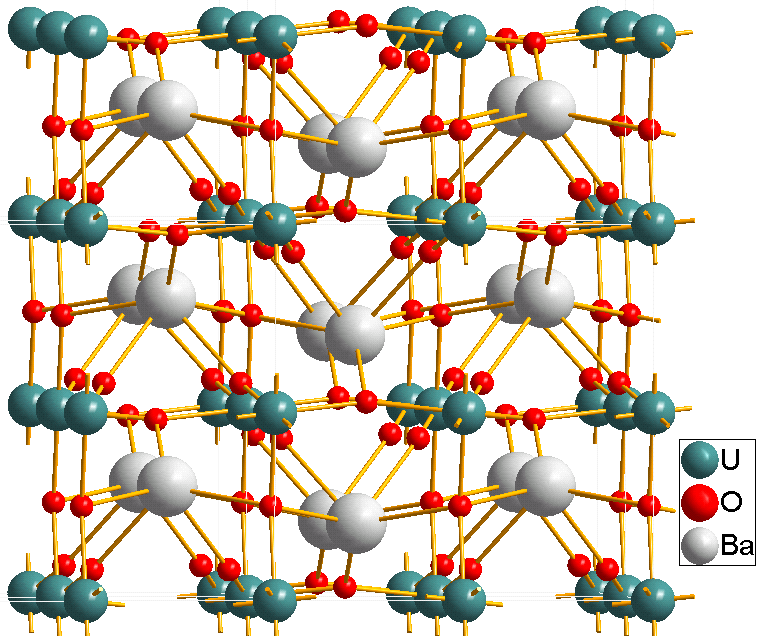
BaUO_{4} structure

All uranates(VI) are mixed oxides, that is, compounds made up of metal(s), uranium and oxygen atoms. No uranium oxyanion, such as [UO_{4}]^{2−} or [U_{2}O_{7}]^{2−}, is known. Instead, all uranate structures are based on UO_{n} polyhedra sharing oxygen atoms in an infinite lattice. The structures of uranates(VI) are unlike the structure of any mixed oxide of elements other than actinide elements. A particular feature is the presence of linear O-U-O moieties, which resemble the uranyl ion, UO_{2}^{2+}. However, the U-O bond length varies from 167 pm, which is similar to the bond length of the uranyl ion, up to about 208 pm in the related compound α-UO_{3}, so it is debatable as to whether these compounds all contain the uranyl ion. There are two principal types of uranate which are defined by the number of nearest-neighbour oxygen atoms in addition to the "uranyl" oxygens.

In one group, including M_{2}UO_{4} (M=Li, Na, K) and MUO_{4} (M=Ca, Sr) there are six additional oxygen atoms. Taking calcium uranate, CaUO_{4}, as an example, the six oxygen atoms are arranged as a flattened octahedron, flattened along the 3-fold symmetry axis of the octahedron which also runs through the O-U-O axis (local point group D_{3d} at the uranium atom). Each of these oxygen atoms is shared between three uranium atoms, which accounts for the stoichiometry, U 2×O 6×1/3 O = UO_{4}. The structure has been described as a hexagonal layer structure. It can also viewed as a distorted fluorite structure in which two U-O distances have decreased and the other six have increased.

In the other group, exemplified by barium uranate, BaUO_{4}, there are four additional oxygen atoms. These four oxygens lie in a plane and each is shared between two uranium atoms, which accounts for the stoichiometry, U 2×O 4×1/2 O = UO_{4}. The structure may called a tetragonal layer structure.

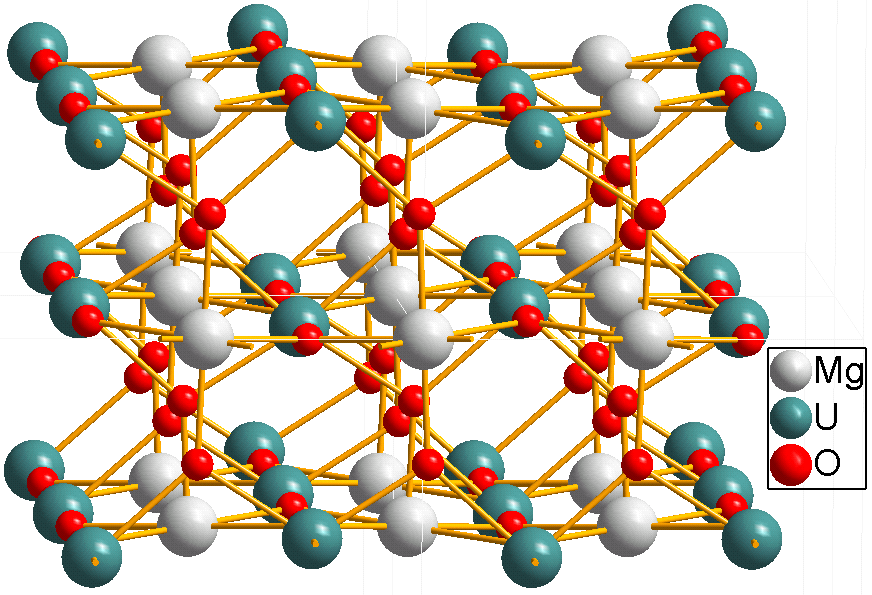
MgUO_{4} structure.

Magnesium uranate, MgUO_{4}, has a quite different structure. Distorted UO_{6} octahedra are linked into infinite chains; the "uranyl" U-O bond length is 192 pm, not much shorter than the other U-O bond length of 218 pm.

A number of so-called diuranates are known. They fall into two categories, compounds of exact composition, synthesized by combination of metal oxides or thermal decomposition of salts of uranyl complexes and substances of approximate composition, found in yellowcake. The name refers only to the empirical formula, M_{x}U_{2}O_{7}; the structures are completely different from ions such as the dichromate ion. For example, in barium diuranate, BaU_{2}O_{7}, UO_{6} octahedral units are joined by sharing edges, forming infinite chains in the directions of the crystallographic a and b directions.

Uranates with more complicated empirical formulas are known. Essentially these arise when the cation:uranium ratio is different from 2:1 (monovalent cations) or 1:1 (divalent cations). Charge-balance constrains the number of oxygen atoms to be equal to half the sum of charges of the cations and uranyl groups. For example, with the cation K^{+}, compounds with K:U ratios of 2, 1 and 0.5 were found, corresponding to empirical formulas K_{2}UO_{4}, K_{2}U_{2}O_{7} and K_{2}U_{4}O_{13}. The uranate structures in these compounds differ in the way the UO_{x} structural units are linked together.

=== Properties and uses ===
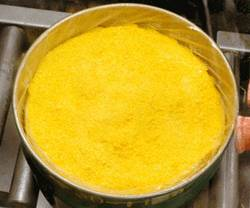
A drum of yellowcake

Yellowcake is produced in the separation of uranium from other elements, by adding alkali to a solution containing uranyl salts.

When the alkali used is ammonia, so-called ammonium diuranate, known in the industry as ADU, is the main constituent of yellowcake. The exact composition of the precipitate depends to some extent on the conditions and anions that are present and the formula (NH_{4})_{2}U_{2}O_{7}, is only an approximation. The precipitates obtained on addition of ammonia to uranyl nitrate solution under different conditions of temperature and final pH, when dried, were considered as loosely bound compounds with an ammonia/uranium ratio of 0.37 containing varying amounts of water and ammonium nitrate. In other studies it was found to approximate to the gross formulas 3UO_{3}·NH_{3}·5H_{2}O, The asymmetric stretching frequency of the uranyl ion was found to decrease with increasing NH_{4}^{+} content. This decrease is continuous and no band splitting was observed, indicating that the ammonium uranate system is homogeneous and continuous.

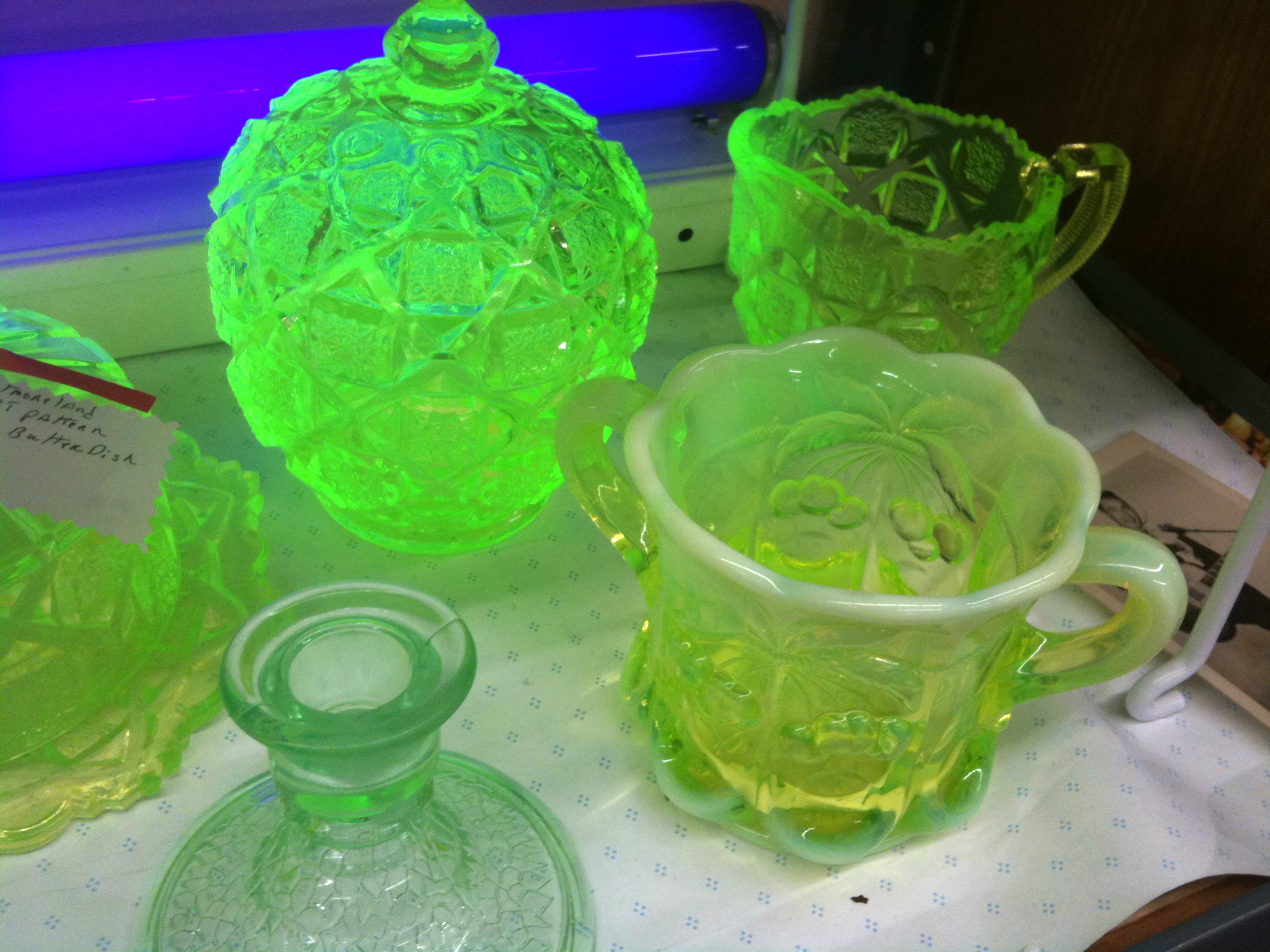
A collection of uranium glassware

ADU is an intermediate in the production of uranium oxides to be used as nuclear fuel; it is converted directly into an oxide by heating. β-UO_{3} is produced at about 350 °C and U_{3}O_{8} is obtained at higher temperatures. When the alkali used is sodium hydroxide, so-called sodium diuranate, SDU, is produced. This can also be converted into an oxide. Another choice of alkali is magnesium oxide, making magnesium diuranate, known as MDU.

Oxides and uranates of uranium(VI) have been used in the past as yellow ceramic glazes as in Fiesta and to make yellow-green uranium glass. Uranates are also important in radioactive waste management.

== Uranium(V) ==
Several series of uranates(V) have been characterized. Compounds with the formula M^{I}UO_{3} have a perovskite structure. Compounds M^{I}_{3}UO_{4} have a defect rock-salt structure. M^{I}_{7}UO_{6} structures are based on a hexagonally close-packed array of oxygen atoms. In all cases the uranium is at the centre of an octahedron of oxygen atoms. Also M^{III}UO_{4} have been recently synthesized and characterized (M^{III}=Bi, Fe, Cr etc.). Few other compounds of uranium(V) are stable.

== Uranium(IV) ==
Barium uranate, BaUO_{3}, is made from barium oxide and uranium dioxide in an atmosphere that contains absolutely no oxygen. It has a cubic crystal structure (space group Pm3̅m).
