= Uranyl hydroxide =

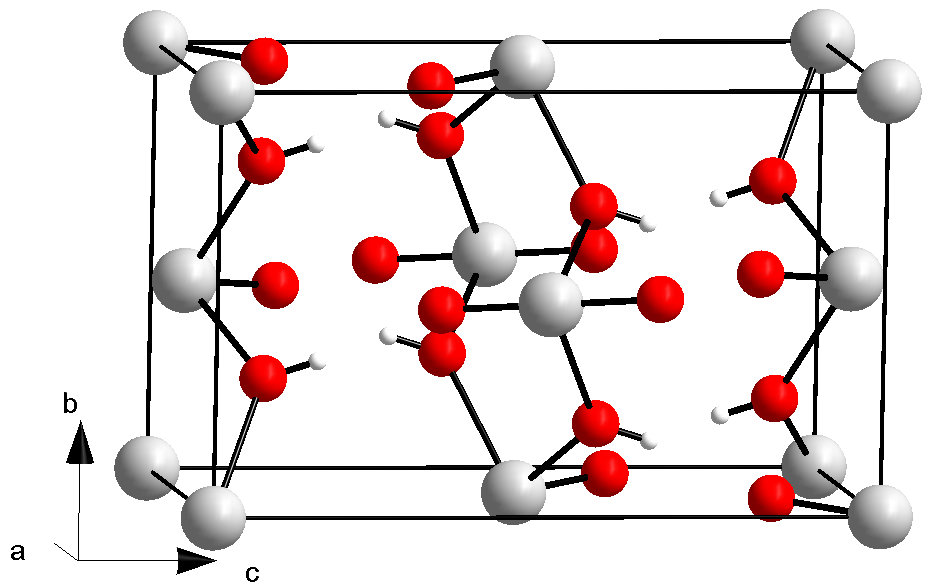
- Ball and stick model of crystalline uranyl hydroxide

Identifiers
CAS Number	211573-15-8
3D model (JSmol)	Interactive image
ChemSpider	4576989
PubChem CID	5465112
UN number	2909
CompTox Dashboard (EPA)	DTXSID201027718
- InChI: InChI=1S/2H2O.2O.U/h2*1H2;;;/q;;;;+2/p-2 Key: VWIQIIGYDAPONF-UHFFFAOYSA-L
- SMILES: O=[U+2]=O.[OH-].[OH-]

Properties
Chemical formula	UH_{2}O_{4}
Molar mass	304.0424 g mol^{−1}

Related compounds
Related compounds	Sulfuric acid Chromic acid Uranium trioxide
- Except where otherwise noted, data are given for materials in their standard state (at 25 °C [77 °F], 100 kPa). verify (what is ?) Infobox references

Uranyl hydroxide is a hydroxide of uranium with the chemical formula UO_{2}(OH)_{2} in the monomeric form and [(UO_{2})_{2}(OH)_{4}]^{2-} in the dimeric; both forms may exist in normal aqueous media. In aerobic conditions, up to 5 hydroxides can bind to uranyl ([(UO_{2})_{2}(OH)_{5}]^{3-}). Uranyl hydroxide hydrate is precipitated as a colloidal yellowcake from oxidized uranium liquors near neutral pH.

Uranyl hydroxide was once used in glassmaking and ceramics in the colouring of the vitreous phases and the preparation of pigments for high temperature firing. The introduction of alkaline diuranates (like sodium diuranate) into glasses leads to yellow by transmission, green by reflection; moreover these glasses become dichroic and fluorescent under ultraviolet rays.

Uranyl hydroxide is teratogenic and radioactive.

== Formation ==
The formation of uranyl hydroxide hydrate can occur via hydrated uranyl fluoride [(UO_{2}F_{2})(H_{2}O)]_{7}·4H_{2}O which is not stable at an elevated water vapor pressure. A complete loss of fluorine is undergone and the formation of uranyl hydroxide hydrate ([(UO_{2})_{4}O(OH)_{6}]·5H_{2}O) occurs. This uranyl hydroxide species is structurally similar to the uranyl hydroxide hydrate minerals schoepite and metaschoepite. X-ray diffraction data was gathered and found that this species has expanded interlayer spacing suggesting there may be additional water molecules in between uranyl layers. Unlike metaschoepite, however, this species does not form UO_{2}(OH)_{2} upon dehydration.

== Reactions ==
1. [UO_{2}(OH)]^{+} + H_{2}O → [(UO_{2}(OH)(H_{2}O)]^{+}
2. [(UO_{2}(OH)(H_{2}O)]^{+} + H_{2}O → [(UO_{2}(OH)(H_{2}O)_{2}]^{+}

UO_{2}(OH)_{2} reacts with water in a hydration reaction to form [(UO_{2}(OH)_{2})(H_{2}O)]^{+} and the monohydrate form also reacted with water to form dihydrates [(UO_{2}OH)(H_{2}O)_{2}]^{+} and trihydrates [(UO_{2}OH)(H_{2}O)_{3}]^{+}. The hydration reaction to form the monohydrate was significantly slower than if the hydroxide were replaced with acetate or nitrate. This could be due to the strongly basic (OH)^{−} reducing the Lewis acidity of U or because the more complex acetate and nitrate anions provide more degrees of freedom. However, it was found that the formation of the dihydrate uranyl hydroxide hydrate (2) was nearly three times faster than the monohydrate (1).

A mechanism for oxygen exchange between the UO_{2}^{2+} cations in a highly alkaline solution was proposed and investigated by Shamov et al. in the Journal of the American Chemical Society. An equilibrium between [UO_{2}(OH)_{4}]^{2-} and [UO_{2}(OH)_{5}]^{3-} was observed followed by the formation of the stable [UO_{3}(OH)_{3}·H_{2}O]^{3-} intermediate that formed from [UO_{2}(OH)_{5}]^{3-} via intramolecular water elimination.
