= Ammonium uranyl carbonate =

Chemical compound

Names
- IUPAC name uranium(VI)dioxide tetra-ammonium tricarbonate
- Other names uranyl ammonium carbonate AUC

Identifiers
CAS Number	18077-77-5
3D model (JSmol)	Interactive image
ChemSpider	32697822
ECHA InfoCard	100.038.156
PubChem CID	76961635
UNII	5F29TO8JCF
CompTox Dashboard (EPA)	DTXSID801350072
- InChI: InChI=1S/3CH2O3.4H3N.2O.U/c3*2-1(3)4;;;;;;;/h3*(H2,2,3,4);4*1H3;;;/q;;;;;;;2*-2;+6/p-2 Key: XHYJUAIOADBAKQ-UHFFFAOYSA-L
- SMILES: C(=O)([O-])[O-].C(=O)([O-])[O-].C(=O)([O-])[O-].[NH4+].[NH4+].[NH4+].[NH4+].[O-2]=[U+6]=[O-2]

Properties
Chemical formula	UO_{2}CO_{3}·2(NH_{4})_{2}CO_{3}
Molar mass	522.199 g/mol
Appearance	lemon-yellow crystalline
Density	2.72
Melting point	Decomposes between 165 °C and 185 °C
Solubility in water	Insoluble

Structure
Crystal structure	monoclinic
Space group	C_{2/c}
Lattice constant	a = 10·68, b = 9·38, c = 12·85 α = 90°, β = 96.45°°, γ = 90°
Lattice volume (V)	1279
Formula units (Z)	4
- Except where otherwise noted, data are given for materials in their standard state (at 25 °C [77 °F], 100 kPa). verify (what is ?) Infobox references

Ammonium uranyl carbonate (UO_{2}CO_{3}·2(NH_{4})_{2}CO_{3}) is known in the uranium processing industry as AUC and is also called uranyl ammonium carbonate. This compound is important as a component in the conversion process of uranium hexafluoride (UF_{6}) to uranium dioxide (UO_{2}). The ammonium uranyl carbonate is combined with steam and hydrogen at 500–600 °C to yield UO_{2}. In another process aqueous uranyl nitrate, known as uranyl nitrate liquor (UNL) is treated with ammonium bicarbonate to form ammonium uranyl carbonate as a solid precipitate. This is separated from the solution, dried with methanol and then calcinated with hydrogen directly to UO_{2} to obtain a sinterable grade powder. The ex-AUC uranium dioxide powder is free-flowing, relatively coarse (10 μ) and porous with specific surface area in the range of 5 m^{2}/g and suitable for direct pelletisation, avoiding the granulation step. Conversion to UO_{2} is often performed as the first stage of nuclear fuel fabrication.

The AUC process is followed in South Korea and Argentina. In the AUC route, calcination, reduction and stabilization are simultaneously carried out in a vertical fluidized bed reactor. In most countries, sinterable grade UO_{2} powder for nuclear fuel is obtained by the ammonium diuranate (ADU) process, which requires several more steps.

Ammonium uranyl carbonate is also one of the many forms called yellowcake; in this case it is the product obtained by the heap leach process.
