= Ducrete =

DUCRETE (Depleted Uranium Concrete) is a high density concrete alternative investigated for use in construction of casks for storage of radioactive waste. It is a composite material containing depleted uranium dioxide aggregate instead of conventional gravel, with a Portland cement binder.

== Background and development ==
In 1993, the United States Department of Energy Office of Environmental Management initiated investigation into the potential use of depleted uranium in heavy concretes. The aim of this investigation was to simultaneously find an application for depleted uranium and to create a new and more efficient method for the storage and transportation of spent nuclear fuels. The material was first conceived at the Idaho National Engineering and Environmental Laboratory (INEEL) by W. Quapp and P. Lessing, who jointly developed the processes behind the material and were awarded both U.S. and foreign patents in 1998 and 2000, respectively.

== Description ==
DUCRETE is a kind of concrete that replaces the standard coarse aggregate with a depleted uranium ceramic material. All of the other materials present in DUCRETE (Portland cement, sand and water) are used in the same volumetric ratio used for ordinary concrete. This ceramic material is a very efficient shielding material since it presents both high atomic number (uranium) for gamma shielding, and low atomic number (water bonded in the concrete) for neutron shielding. There exists an optimum uranium-to-binder ratio for a combined attenuation of gamma and neutron radiation at a given wall thickness. A balance needs to be established between the attenuation of the gamma flux in the Depleted Uranium Oxide (DUO_{2}) and the cement phase with water to attenuate the neutron flux.

The key to effective shielding with depleted uranium ceramic concrete is maximum uranium oxide density. Unfortunately, the densest depleted uranium oxide is also the most chemically unstable. DUO_{2} has a maximum theoretical density of 10.5 g/cm^{3} at 95% purity. However, under oxidation conditions, this material readily transforms into the more stable depleted uranium trioxide (DUO_{3}) or depleted triuranium octaoxide (DU_{3}O_{8}). Thus, if naked UO_{2} aggregate is used, this transitions can result in an expansion that may generate stresses that could crack the material, lowering its compressive strength. Another limitation for the direct use of depleted uranium dioxide fine powder is that concretes depend on their coarse aggregates to carry compressive stresses. In order to overcome these issues, DUAGG was developed.

DUAGG (depleted uranium aggregate) is the term applied to the stabilized DUO_{2} ceramic. This consists of sintered DUO_{2} particles with a silicate-based coating that covers the surfaces and fills the spaces between the grains, acting as an oxygen barrier, as well as corrosion and leach resistance. DUAGG has a density up to 8.8 g/cm^{3} and replaces the conventional aggregate in concrete, producing concrete with a density of 5.6 to 6.4 g/cm^{3}, compared to 2.3 g/cm^{3} for conventional concrete.

Also, DUCRETE presents environmentally friendly properties. The table below shows the effectiveness of converting depleted uranium into concrete, since potential leaching is decreased in a high order. The leach test used was the EPA Toxicity characteristic leaching procedure (TCLP), which is used to assess heavy metal risks to the environment.

Uranium form	U concentration in leachate (mg U/L)
DUCRETE	0.42
DUAGG	4
UO_{2}	172
U_{3}O_{8}	420
UF4	7367
UO_{3}	6900

== Production ==
=== U.S. method ===
DUCRETE is produced by mixing a DUO_{2} aggregate with Portland cement. DU is a result of the enrichment of uranium for use in nuclear power generation and other fields. DU usually comes bonded with fluorine in uranium hexafluoride. This compound is highly reactive and cannot be used in the DUCRETE. Uranium hexafluoride must therefore be oxidized into triuranium octoxide and uranium trioxide. These compounds are then converted to UO_{2} (uranium oxide) through the addition of hydrogen gas. The UO_{2} is then dried, crushed, and milled into a uniform sediment. This then converted into small inch-long briquettes through the use of high pressure (6,000 psi (410 bar)). The low-atomic number binder is then added and undergoes pyrolysis. The compound then undergoes liquid phase sintering at 1300 °C until the desired density is achieved, usually around 8.9 g/cm^{3}. The briquettes are then crushed and gap sorted and are now ready to be mixed into DUCRETE.

=== VNIINM (Russian) method ===
The VNIINM method is very similar to the U.S. method except it does not gap sort the binder and UO_{2} after it is crushed.

== Applications ==
After processing, DUCRETE composite may be used in container vessels, shielding structures, and containment storage areas, all of which can be used to store radioactive waste. The primary implementation of this material is within a dry cask storage system for high level waste (HLW) and spent nuclear fuel (SNF). In such a system, the composite would be the primary component used to shield radiation from workers and the public. Cask systems made from DUCRETE are smaller and lighter in weight than casks made from conventional materials, such as traditional concrete. DUCRETE containers need only be about 1/3 as thick to provide the same degree of radiation shielding as concrete systems.

Analysis has shown that DUCRETE is more cost effective than conventional materials. The cost for the production of casks made with DUCRETE is low when compared with other shielding materials such as steel, lead and DU metal, since less material is required as a consequence of a higher density. In a study by Duke Engineering at a nuclear waste facility at Savannah River, the DUCRETE cask system was evaluated at a lower cost than an alternative Glass Waste storage building. However, disposal of the DUCRETE was not considered. Since DUCRETE is a low level radioactive composite, its relatively expensive disposal could decrease the cost effectiveness of such systems. An alternative to such disposal is the use of empty DUCRETE casks as a container for high activity low-level waste.

While DUCRETE shows potential for future nuclear waste programs, such concepts are far from utilization. So far, no DUCRETE cask systems have been licensed in the U.S.

== See also ==
- Pykrete
