= Uranium trioxide =

Uranium-Oxygen compound

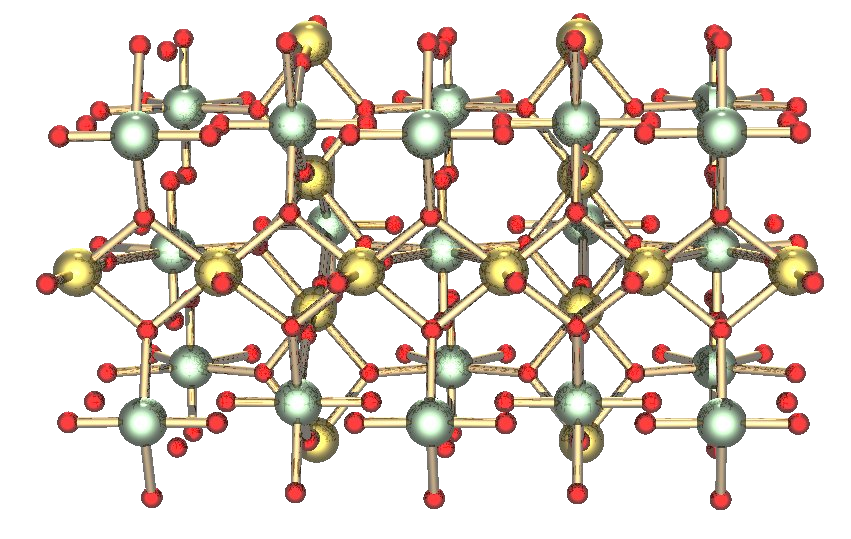

Names
- IUPAC names Uranium trioxide Uranium(VI) oxide
- Other names Uranyl oxide Uranic oxide

Identifiers
CAS Number	1344-58-7
3D model (JSmol)	Interactive image
ChemSpider	66635
ECHA InfoCard	100.014.274
EC Number	215-701-9
PubChem CID	74013
UNII	Q47SFG7DIQ
CompTox Dashboard (EPA)	DTXSID901014433
- InChI: InChI=1S/3O.U Key: JCMLRUNDSXARRW-UHFFFAOYSA-N
- SMILES: O=[U](=O)=O

Properties
Chemical formula	UO_{3}
Molar mass	286.29 g/mol
Appearance	yellow-orange powder
Density	5.5–8.7 g/cm^{3}
Melting point	~200–650 °C (decomposes)
Solubility in water	insoluble

Structure
Crystal structure	see text
Space group	I4_{1}/amd (γ-UO_{3})

Thermochemistry
Std molar entropy (S^{⦵}_{298})	99 J·mol^{−1}·K^{−1}
Std enthalpy of formation (Δ_{f}H^{⦵}_{298})	−1230 kJ·mol^{−1}

Hazards
- GHS labelling
Pictograms	(GHS06: Toxic) (GHS08: Health hazard) (GHS09: Environmental hazard)
Signal word	Danger
Hazard statements	H300, H330, H373, H411
NFPA 704 (fire diamond)	4 0 1 OX
Flash point	Non-flammable
Safety data sheet (SDS)	External MSDS

Related compounds
Related uranium oxides	Uranium dioxide Triuranium octoxide
Related compounds	Plutonium trioxide Neptunium trioxide
- Except where otherwise noted, data are given for materials in their standard state (at 25 °C [77 °F], 100 kPa). verify (what is ?) Infobox references

Uranium trioxide (UO_{3}), also called uranyl oxide, uranium(VI) oxide, and uranic oxide, is the hexavalent oxide of uranium. The solid may be obtained by heating uranyl nitrate to 400 °C. Its most commonly encountered polymorph is amorphous UO_{3}.

== Production and use ==
There are three methods to generate uranium trioxide. As noted below, two are used industrially in the reprocessing of nuclear fuel and uranium enrichment.

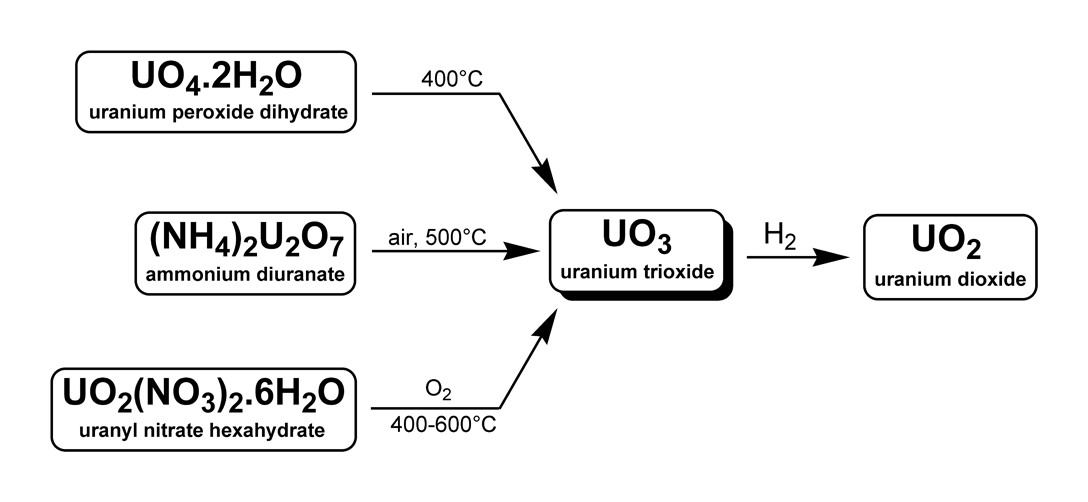

1. U_{3}O_{8} can be oxidized at 500 °C with oxygen. Note that above 750 °C even in 5 atm O_{2} UO_{3} decomposes into U_{3}O_{8}.
2. Uranyl nitrate, UO_{2}(NO_{3})_{2}·6H_{2}O can be heated to yield UO_{3}. This occurs during the reprocessing of nuclear fuel. Fuel rods are dissolved in HNO_{3} to separate uranyl nitrate from plutonium and the fission products (the PUREX method). The pure uranyl nitrate is converted to solid UO_{3} by heating at 400 °C. After reduction with hydrogen (with other inert gas present) to uranium dioxide, the uranium can be used in new MOX fuel rods.
3. Ammonium diuranate or sodium diuranate (Na_{2}U_{2}O_{7}·6H_{2}O) may be decomposed. Sodium diuranate, also known as yellowcake, is converted to uranium trioxide in the enrichment of uranium. Uranium dioxide and uranium tetrafluoride are intermediates in the process which ends in uranium hexafluoride.

Uranium trioxide is shipped between processing facilities in the form of a gel, most often from mines to conversion plants.

Cameco Corporation, which operates at the world's largest uranium refinery at Blind River, Ontario, produces high-purity uranium trioxide.

It has been reported that the corrosion of uranium in a silica rich aqueous solution forms uranium dioxide, uranium trioxide, and coffinite. In pure water, schoepite (UO_{2})_{8}O_{2}(OH)_{12}·12(H_{2}O) is formed in the first week and then after four months studtite (UO_{2})O_{2}·4(H_{2}O) was produced. This alteration of uranium oxide also leads to the formation of metastudtite, a more stable uranyl peroxide, often found in the surface of spent nuclear fuel exposed to water. Reports on the corrosion of uranium metal have been published by the Royal Society.

== Health and safety hazards ==
Like all hexavalent uranium compounds, UO_{3} is hazardous by inhalation, ingestion, and through skin contact. It is a poisonous, slightly radioactive substance, which may cause shortness of breath, coughing, acute arterial lesions, and changes in the chromosomes of white blood cells and gonads leading to congenital malformations if inhaled. However, once ingested, uranium is mainly toxic for the kidneys and may severely affect their function.

== Structure ==
=== Solid state structure ===
The only well characterized binary trioxide of any actinide is UO_{3}, of which several polymorphs are known. Solid UO_{3} loses O_{2} on heating to give green-colored U_{3}O_{8}: reports of the decomposition temperature in air vary from 200 to 650 °C. Heating at 700 °C under H_{2} gives dark brown uranium dioxide (UO_{2}), which is used in MOX nuclear fuel rods.

==== Alpha ====
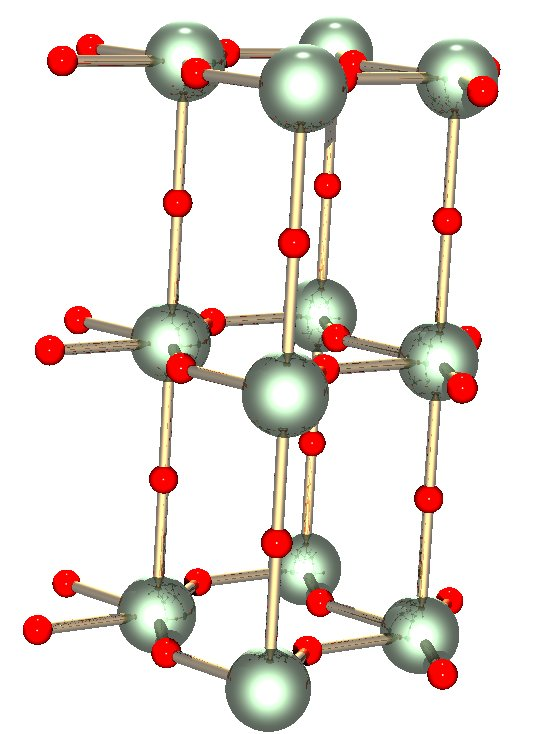

The α (alpha) form: a layered solid where the 2D layers are linked by oxygen atoms (shown in red)
Hydrated uranyl peroxide formed by the addition of hydrogen peroxide to an aqueous solution of uranyl nitrate when heated to 200–225 °C forms an amorphous uranium trioxide which on heating to 400–450 °C will form alpha-uranium trioxide. It has been stated that the presence of nitrate will lower the temperature at which the exothermic change from the amorphous form to the alpha form occurs.

==== Beta ====
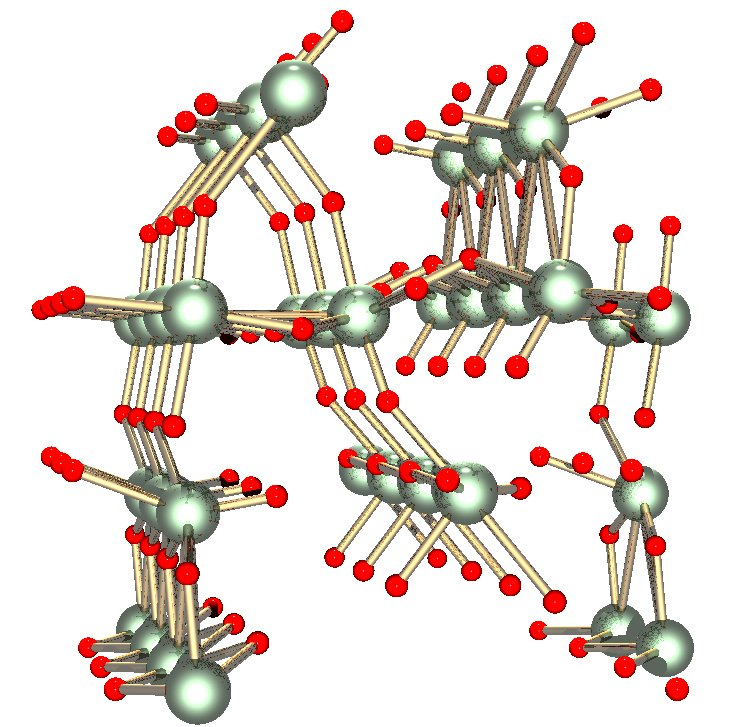

The β (beta) UO_{3} form: This solid contains multiple unique uranium sites and distorted polyhedra.
This form can be formed by heating ammonium diuranate, while P.C. Debets and B.O. Loopstra, found four solid phases in the UO_{3}-H_{2}O-NH_{3} system that they could all be considered as being UO_{2}(OH)_{2}·H_{2}O where some of the water has been replaced with ammonia. It was found that calcination at 500 °C in air forms the beta form of uranium trioxide. Later experiments found the most reliable method for synthesizing pure β-UO_{3} was to calcinate uranyl nitrate hexahydrate at 450 °C for 6 days and cool slowly over 24 hours.

==== Gamma ====
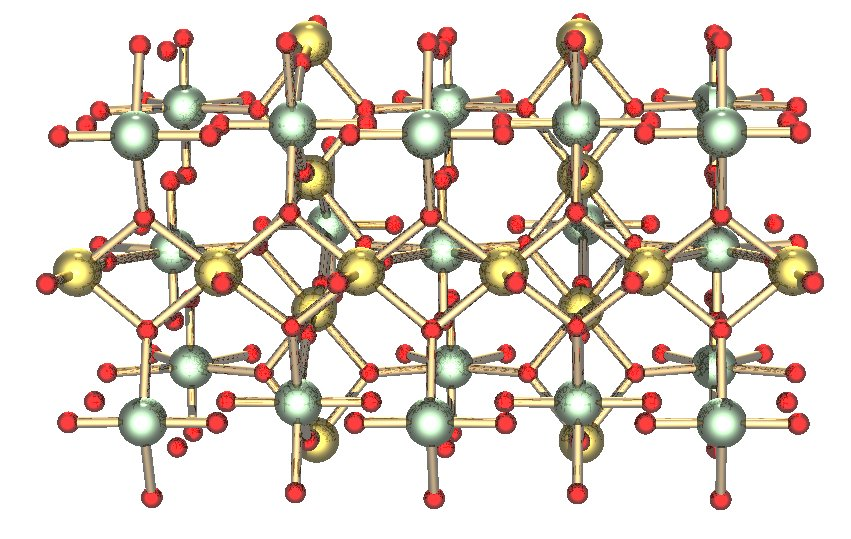

The γ (gamma) form: with the different uranium environments in green and yellow
The most frequently encountered polymorph is γ-UO_{3}, whose x-ray structure has been solved from powder diffraction data. The compound crystallizes in the space group I4_{1}/amd with two uranium atoms in the asymmetric unit. Both are surrounded by somewhat distorted octahedra of oxygen atoms. One uranium atom has two closer and four more distant oxygen atoms whereas the other has four close and two more distant oxygen atoms as neighbors. Thus it is not incorrect to describe the structure as [UO_{2}]^{2+}[UO_{4}]^{2−}, that is uranyl uranate.

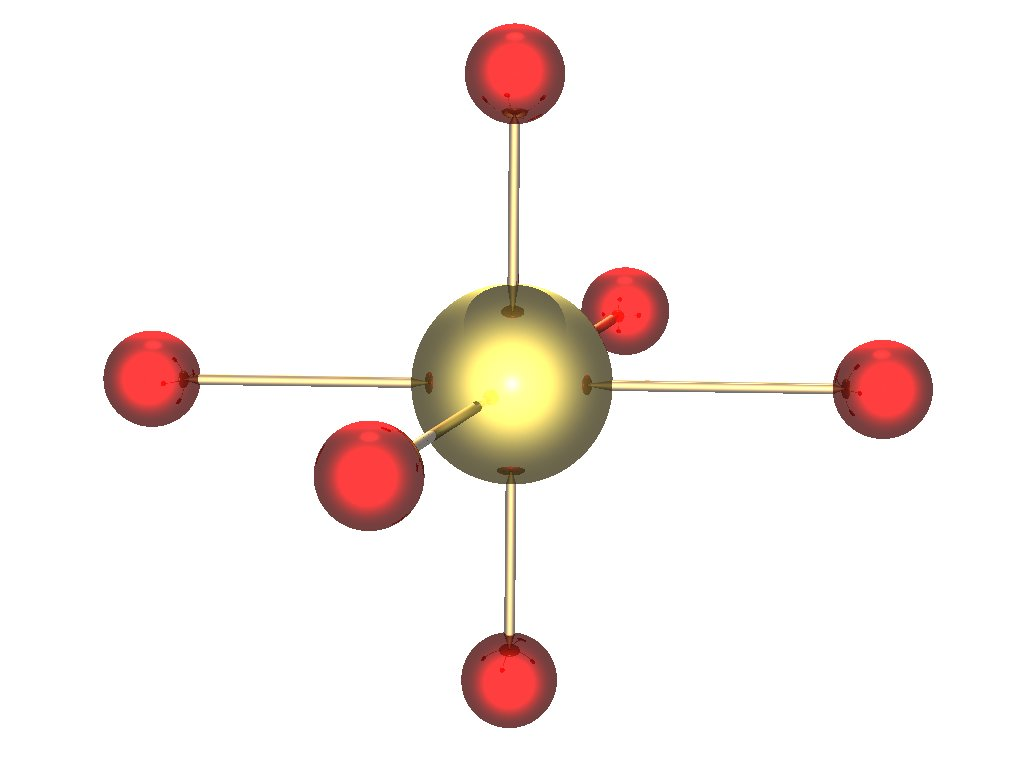

The environment of the uranium atoms shown as yellow in the gamma form

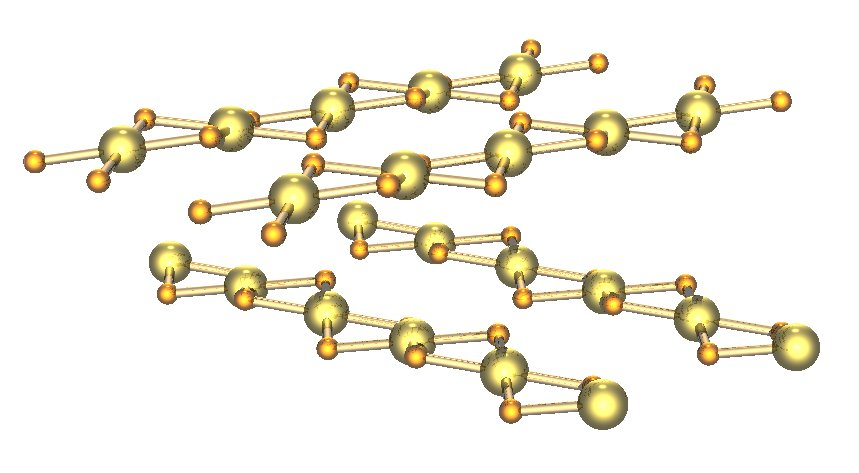

The chains of U_{2}O_{2} rings in the gamma form in layers, alternate layers running at 90 degrees to each other. These chains are shown as containing the yellow uranium atoms, in an octahedral environment which are distorted towards square planar by an elongation of the axial oxygen-uranium bonds.

==== Delta ====
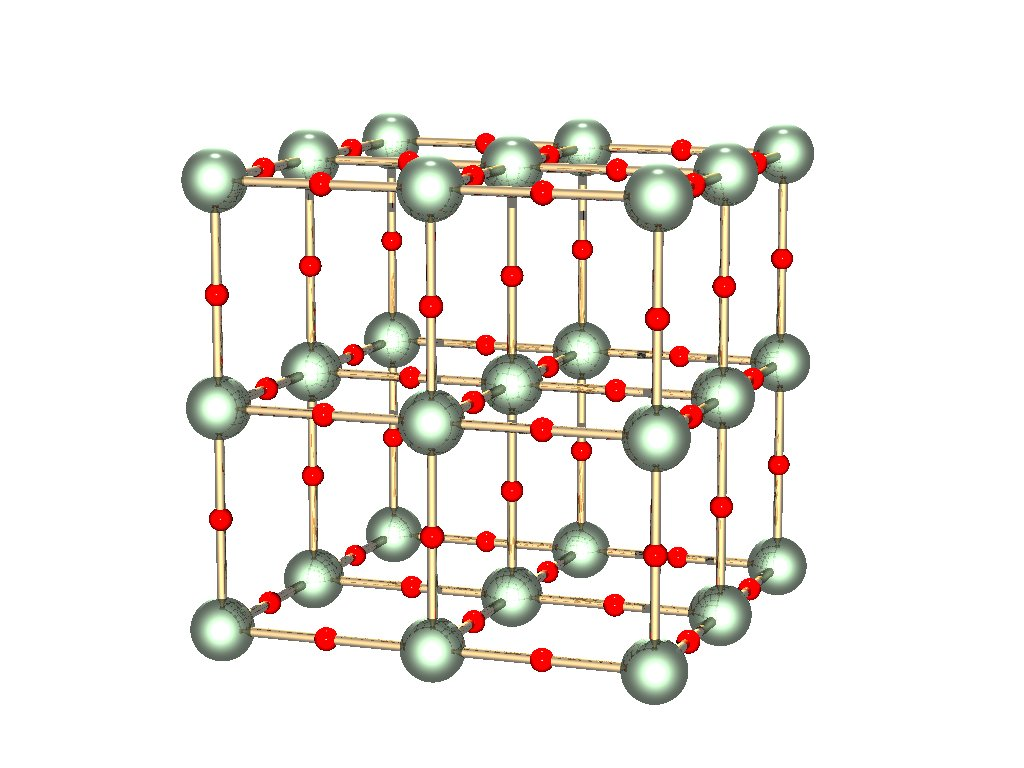

The delta (δ) form is a cubic solid where the oxygen atoms are arranged between the uranium atoms.

==== Epsilon ====
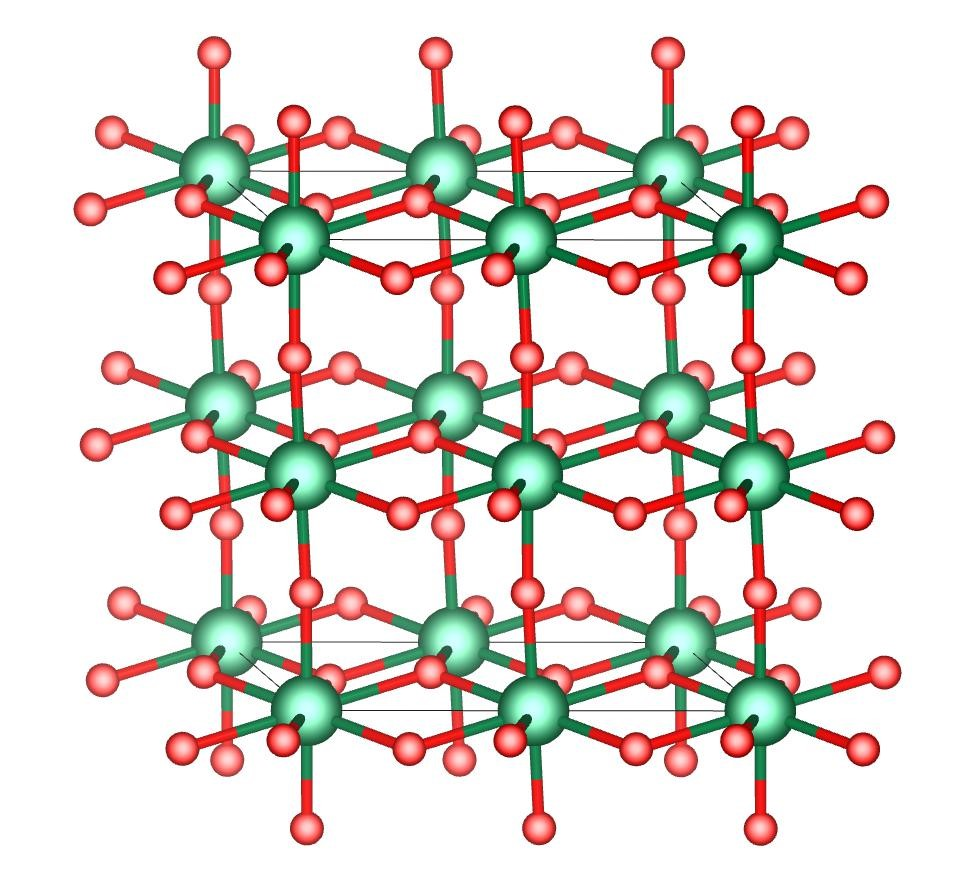

The proposed crystal structure of the epsilon (ε) form consists of sheets of uranium hexagonal bipyramids connected through edge-sharing polyhedra. These sheets are connected through the axial uranyl oxygen atoms. The proposed structure is in the triclinic P-1 space group.

==== High pressure form ====
There is a high-pressure solid form with U_{2}O_{2} and U_{3}O_{3} rings in it.

==== Hydrates ====
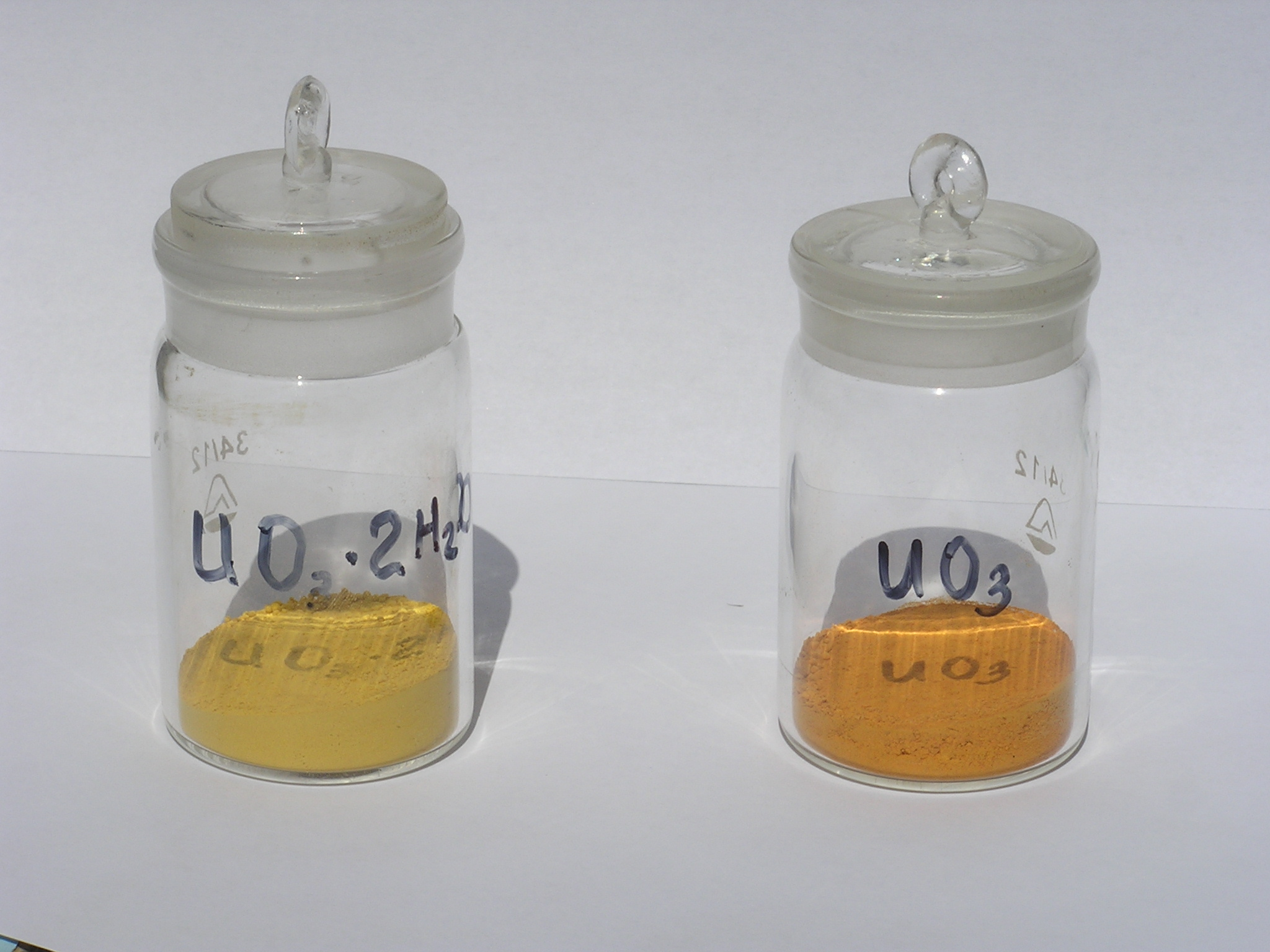
Hydrous and anhydrous forms of UO_{3}

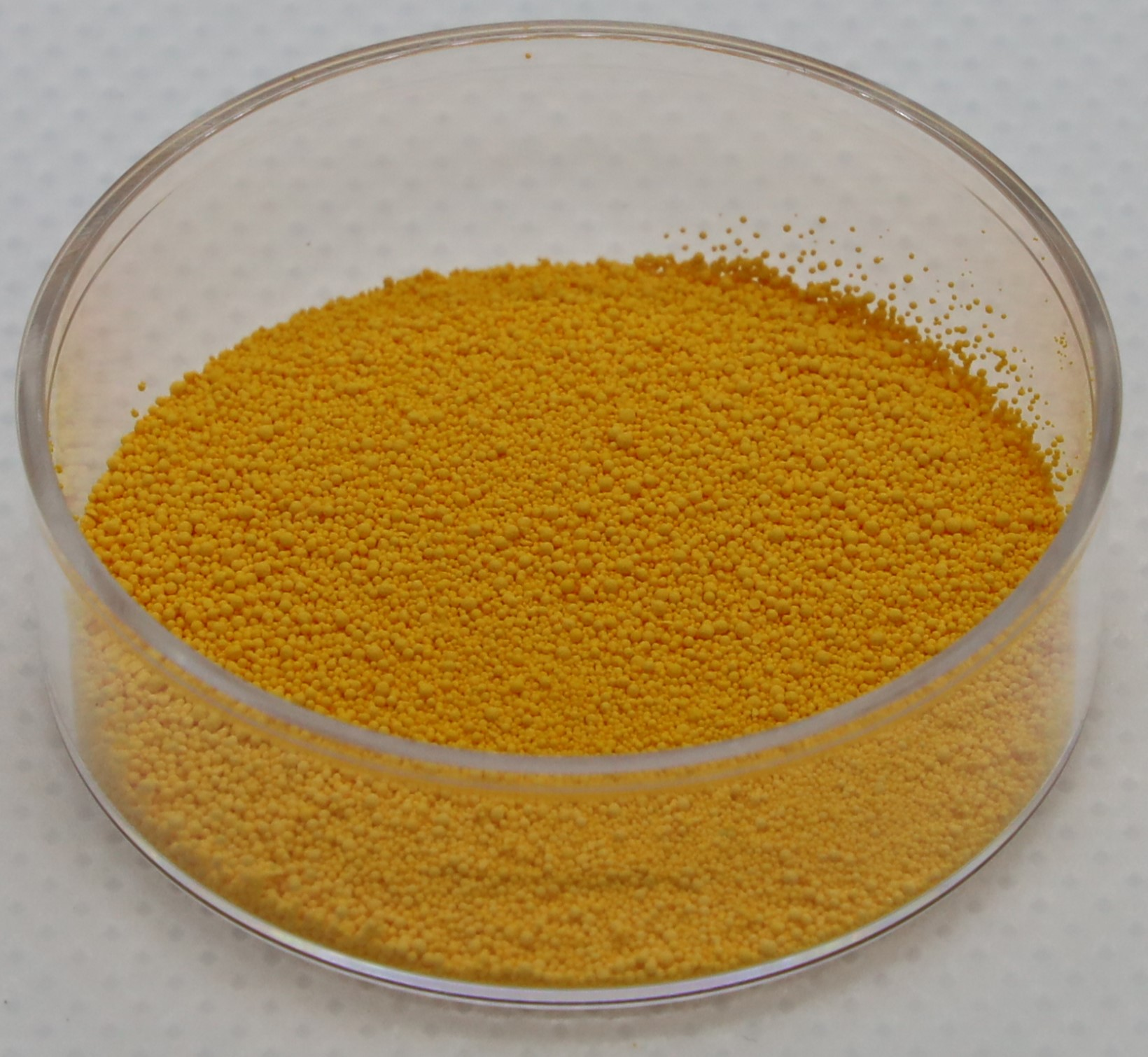
Anhydrous forms of UO_{3}

Several hydrates of uranium trioxide are known, e.g., UO_{3}·6H_{2}O, which are commonly known as "uranic acid" in older literature due to their similarity in formula to various metal oxyacids, although they are not in fact particularly acidic.

=== Molecular forms ===
While uranium trioxide is encountered as a polymeric solid under ambient conditions, some work has been done on the molecular form in the gas phase, in matrix isolations studies, and computationally.

==== Gas phase ====
At elevated temperatures gaseous UO_{3} is in equilibrium with solid U_{3}O_{8} and molecular oxygen.

2 U_{3}O_{8}(s) + O_{2}(g) ⇌ 6 UO_{3}(g)

With increasing temperature the equilibrium is shifted to the right. This system has been studied at temperatures between 900 °C and 2500 °C. The vapor pressure of monomeric UO_{3} in equilibrium with air and solid U_{3}O_{8} at ambient pressure, about 10^{−5} mbar (1 mPa) at 980 °C, rising to 0.1 mbar (10 Pa) at 1400 °C, 0.34 mbar (34 Pa) at 2100 °C, 1.9 mbar (193 Pa) at 2300 °C, and 8.1 mbar (809 Pa) at 2500 °C.

==== Matrix isolation ====
Infrared spectroscopy of molecular UO_{3} isolated in an argon matrix indicates a T-shaped structure (point group C_{2v}) for the molecule. This is in contrast to the commonly encountered D_{3h} molecular symmetry exhibited by most trioxides. From the force constants the authors deduct the U-O bond lengths to be between 1.76 and 1.79 Å (176 to 179 pm).

==== Computational study ====
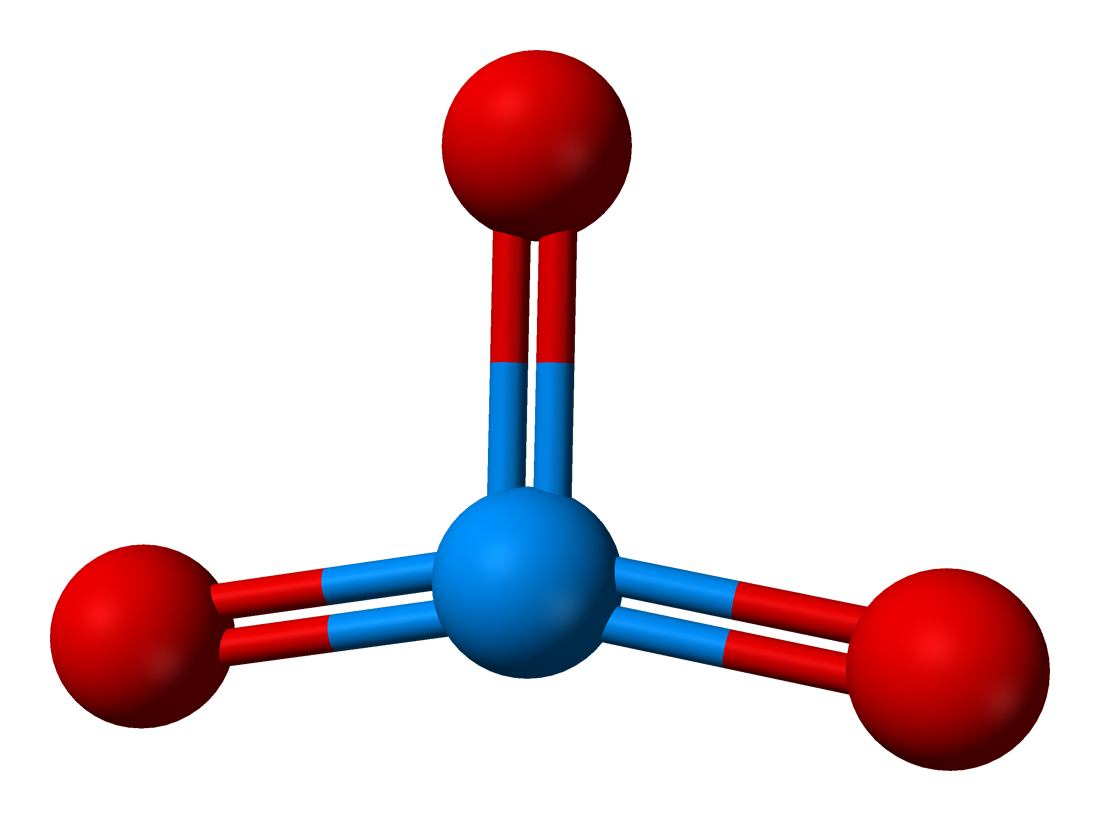
The calculated geometry of molecular uranium trioxide has C_{2v} symmetry.

Calculations predict that the point group of molecular UO_{3} is C_{2v}, with an axial bond length of 1.75 Å, an equatorial bond length of 1.83 Å and an angle of 161° between the axial oxygens. The more symmetrical D_{3h} species is a saddle point, 49 kJ/mol above the C_{2v} minimum. The authors invoke a second-order Jahn–Teller effect as explanation.

=== Cubic form of uranium trioxide ===
The crystal structure of a uranium trioxide phase of composition UO_{2·82} has been determined by X-ray powder diffraction techniques using a Guinier-type focusing camera. The unit cell is cubic with a = 4·138 ± 0·005 kX. A uranium atom is located at (000) and oxygens at (View the MathML source), (View the MathML source), and (View the MathML source) with some anion vacancies. The compound is isostructural with ReO_{3}. The U-O bond distance of 2·073 Å agrees with that predicted by Zachariasen for a bond strength S = 1.

== Reactivity ==
Uranium trioxide reacts at 400 °C with freon-12 to form chlorine, phosgene, carbon dioxide and uranium tetrafluoride. The freon-12 can be replaced with freon-11 which forms carbon tetrachloride instead of carbon dioxide. This is a case of a hard perhalogenated freon which is normally considered to be inert being converted chemically at a moderate temperature.

2 CF_{2}Cl_{2} + UO_{3} → UF_{4} + CO_{2} + COCl_{2} + Cl_{2}

4 CFCl_{3} + UO_{3} → UF_{4} + 3 COCl_{2} + CCl_{4} + Cl_{2}

Uranium trioxide can be dissolved in a mixture of tributyl phosphate and thenoyltrifluoroacetone in supercritical carbon dioxide, ultrasound was employed during the dissolution.

=== Electrochemical modification ===
The reversible insertion of magnesium cations into the lattice of uranium trioxide by cyclic voltammetry using a graphite electrode modified with microscopic particles of the uranium oxide has been investigated. This experiment has also been done for U_{3}O_{8}. This is an example of electrochemistry of a solid modified electrode, the experiment which used for uranium trioxide is related to a carbon paste electrode experiment. It is also possible to reduce uranium trioxide with sodium metal to form sodium uranium oxides.

It has been the case that it is possible to insert lithium into the uranium trioxide lattice by electrochemical means, this is similar to the way that some rechargeable lithium ion batteries work. In these rechargeable cells one of the electrodes is a metal oxide which contains a metal such as cobalt which can be reduced, to maintain the electroneutrality for each electron which is added to the electrode material a lithium ion enters the lattice of this oxide electrode.

=== Amphoterism and reactivity to form related uranium(VI) anions and cations ===
Uranium oxide is amphoteric and reacts as acid and as a base, depending on the conditions.

==== As an acid ====
UO_{3} + H_{2}O → UO^{2−}_{4} + 2 H^{+}

Dissolving uranium oxide in a strong base like sodium hydroxide forms the doubly negatively charged uranate anion (UO^{2−}_{4}). Uranates tend to concatenate, forming diuranate, U_{2}O^{2−}_{7}, or other poly-uranates. Important diuranates include ammonium diuranate ((NH_{4})_{2}U_{2}O_{7}), sodium diuranate (Na_{2}U_{2}O_{7}) and magnesium diuranate (MgU_{2}O_{7}), which forms part of some yellowcakes. It is worth noting that uranates of the form M_{2}UO_{4} do not contain UO^{2−}_{4} ions, but rather flattened UO_{6} octahedra, containing a uranyl group and bridging oxygens.

==== As a base ====
UO_{3} + H_{2}O → UO^{2+}_{2} + 2 OH^{−}

Dissolving uranium oxide in a strong acid like sulfuric or nitric acid forms the double positive charged uranyl cation. The uranyl nitrate formed (UO_{2}(NO_{3})_{2}·6H_{2}O) is soluble in ethers, alcohols, ketones and esters; for example, tributylphosphate. This solubility is used to separate uranium from other elements in nuclear reprocessing, which begins with the dissolution of nuclear fuel rods in nitric acid to form this salt. The uranyl nitrate is then converted to uranium trioxide by heating.

From nitric acid one obtains uranyl nitrate, trans-UO_{2}(NO_{3})_{2}·2H_{2}O, consisting of eight-coordinated uranium with two bidentate nitrato ligands and two water ligands as well as the familiar O=U=O core.

== Uranium oxides in ceramics ==
UO_{3}-based ceramics become green or black when fired in a reducing atmosphere and yellow to orange when fired with oxygen. Orange-coloured Fiestaware is a well-known example of a product with a uranium-based glaze. UO_{3}-has also been used in formulations of enamel, uranium glass, and porcelain.

Prior to 1960, UO_{3} was used as an agent of crystallization in crystalline coloured glazes. It is possible to determine with a Geiger counter if a glaze or glass was made from UO_{3}.
