= Plutonium trioxide =

Names
- Other names Plutonium(VI) oxide

Identifiers
CAS Number	12311-78-3
3D model (JSmol)	Interactive image
- InChI: InChI=1S/H2O.3O.Pu/h1H2;;;;/q;3*-2;+6 Key: XKRCXWINTGBBQF-UHFFFAOYSA-N
- SMILES: [Pu+6].[O-2].[O-2].[O-2].O

Properties
Chemical formula	PuO_{3}
Molar mass	536 g·mol^{−1}
Appearance	golden-red crystals (hydrates)
Solubility in water	insoluble (hydrates)

Related compounds
Other anions	Uranium trioxide; Neptunium trioxide
- Except where otherwise noted, data are given for materials in their standard state (at 25 °C [77 °F], 100 kPa). Infobox references

Plutonium trioxide is an inorganic compound of plutonium and oxygen with the chemical formula PuO_{3}. This is a high-order oxide of plutonium where the metal is in the +6 oxidation state. The compound is less stable and less common than the common plutonium dioxide PuO_{2}.

Theoretical calculations on molecular actinide trioxides predict that while molecular plutonium trioxide should attain the +6 oxidation state for plutonium, the molecular trioxides of the heavier actinides should be regarded as having the actinide in the +5 oxidation state

== Synthesis ==
Initially, plutonium(III) hydroxide is obtained, which then transforms into plutonium(IV) hydroxide in air, and then oxygen containing ozone is passed through the suspension:

Pu(OH)_{4} + O_{3} → PuO_{3}·H_{2}O + O_{2} + H_{2}O

== Physical properties ==
Plutonium trioxide forms hydrates of variable composition PuO_{3}·xH_{2}O, where x = 0.8–1, which are golden-red crystals. Not isolated in the anhydrous state: it decomposes when attempted to separate the water.

== Chemical properties ==
Decomposes when heated:

2 PuO_{3}·xH_{2}O → 2 PuO_{2} + O_{2} + 2x H_{2}O
