= Triuranium octoxide =

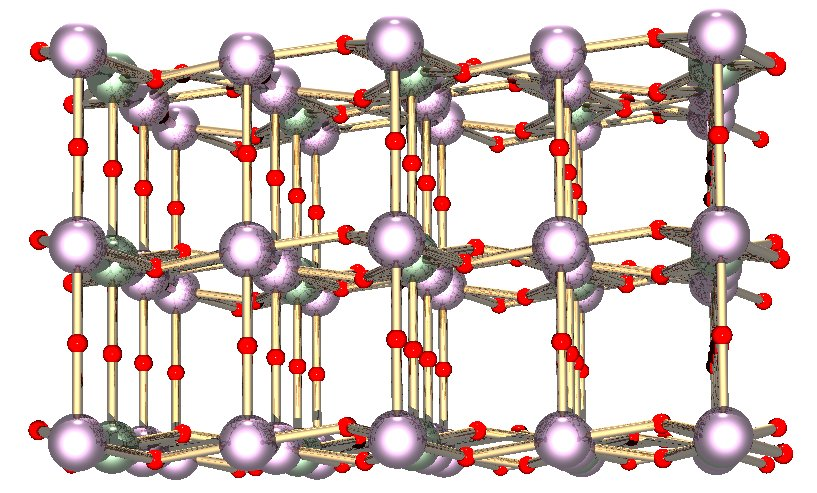

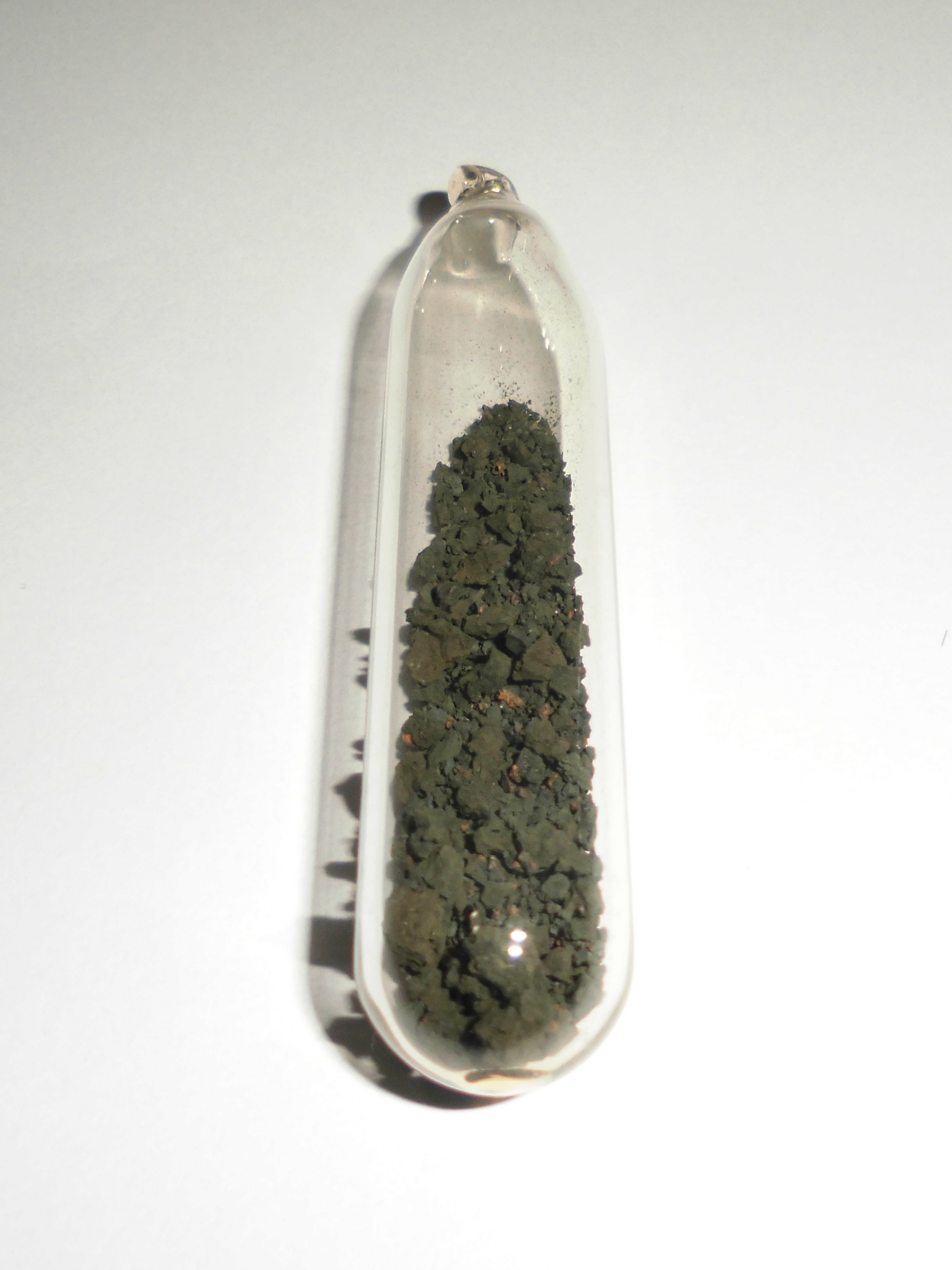

Names
- Other names Uranium(V,VI) oxide Pitchblende; C.I. 77919

Identifiers
CAS Number	1344-59-8
3D model (JSmol)	Interactive image
ChemSpider	10142128
ECHA InfoCard	100.014.275
EC Number	215-702-4
PubChem CID	11968241
CompTox Dashboard (EPA)	DTXSID60893930
- InChI: InChI=1S/8O.3U Key: IQWPWKFTJFECBS-UHFFFAOYSA-N
- SMILES: [O].[O].[O].[O].[O].[O].[O].[O].[U].[U].[U]

Properties
Chemical formula	U_{3}O_{8}
Molar mass	842.08 g/mol
Density	8.38 g/cm^{3}
Melting point	1,150 °C (2,100 °F; 1,420 K)
Boiling point	decomposes to UO_{2} at 1,300 °C (2,370 °F; 1,570 K)
Solubility in water	Insoluble
Solubility	Soluble in nitric acid and sulfuric acid

Thermochemistry
Std molar entropy (S^{⦵}_{298})	282 J·mol^{−1}·K^{−1}
Std enthalpy of formation (Δ_{f}H^{⦵}_{298})	−3575 kJ·mol^{−1}

Hazards
- GHS labelling
Pictograms	(GHS06: Toxic) (GHS08: Health hazard) (GHS09: Environmental hazard)
Signal word	Danger
Hazard statements	H300, H330, H373, H411
- Except where otherwise noted, data are given for materials in their standard state (at 25 °C [77 °F], 100 kPa). Infobox references

Triuranium octoxide (U_{3}O_{8}) is a compound of uranium. It is present as an olive green solid, and is one of the forms of yellowcake.

In the presence of oxygen (O_{2}), uranium dioxide (UO_{2}) is oxidized to U_{3}O_{8}, whereas uranium trioxide (UO_{3}) loses oxygen at temperatures above 500 °C and is reduced to U_{3}O_{8}. The compound can be produced by the calcination of ammonium diuranate or ammonium uranyl carbonate. Due to its high stability, it can be used for the disposal of depleted uranium. Its particle density is 8.38 g cm^{-3}. Triuranium octoxide is converted to uranium hexafluoride for the purpose of uranium enrichment.

== Production ==
Triuranium octoxide is produced industrially by the calcination of ammonium uranyl carbonate or ammonium diuranate. The ammonium uranyl carbonate (AUC) method is as follows:

Uranium hexafluoride is hydrolyzed in water to form uranyl fluoride...

UF_{6}(g) + 2 H_{2}O(l) → UO_{2}F_{2}(aq) + 4 HF(aq)

... which is then precipitated with ammonium carbonate:

UO_{2}F_{2}(aq) + 3 (NH_{4})_{2}CO_{3} → (NH_{4})_{4}UO_{2}(CO_{3})_{3} + 2 NH_{4}F

The resulting ammonium uranyl carbonate is left to dry and then heated in air:

3 (NH_{4})_{4}UO_{2}(CO_{3})_{3} → U_{3}O_{8} + 4 NH_{3} + 5 CO_{2} + 2 H_{2}O + ½ O_{2}

== Formation ==
Triuranium octoxide is formed by the multi-step oxidation of uranium dioxide by oxygen gas at around 250 °C:

8 UO_{2} + O_{2} → 2 U_{4}O_{9}
6 U_{4}O_{9} + O_{2} → 8 U_{3}O_{7}
2 U_{3}O_{7} + O_{2} → 2 U_{3}O_{8}

It can also be formed from the reduction of compounds like ammonium uranyl carbonate, ammonium diuranate, and uranium trioxide through calcination at high temperatures (~600 °C for (NH_{4})_{2}U_{2}O_{7}, 700 °C for UO_{3}):

3 UO_{3} → U_{3}O_{8} + 1/_{2} O_{2}

Uranium trioxide can be reduced by other methods, such as reaction with reducing agents like hydrogen gas at around 500 °C−700 °C:

3 UO_{3} + H_{2} → U_{3}O_{8} + H_{2}O

This process can produce other uranium oxides, such as U_{4}O_{9} and UO_{2}.

== Chemical properties ==
=== Oxidation state ===
While many studies have shown contradicting results on the oxidation state of uranium in U_{3}O_{8}, a study on its absorption spectrum by Kvashnina et al. determined that each formula unit of U_{3}O_{8} contains 2 U^{V} atoms and 1 U^{VI} atom, without any atoms of U^{IV}. The study used the compounds uranium dioxide and uranyl acetylacetonate as references for the spectra of U^{IV} and U^{VI}, respectively. The analysis that U_{3}O_{8} contains 2 U^{V} and 1 U^{VI} is supported by X-ray photoelectron spectroscopy.

=== Reactions ===
Triuranium octoxide can be reduced to uranium dioxide through reduction with hydrogen:

U_{3}O_{8} + 2 H_{2} → 3 UO_{2} + 2 H_{2}O

Triuranium octoxide also loses oxygen to form a non-stoichiometric compound (U_{3}O_{8-z}) at high temperatures (>800 °C), but recovers it when reverted to normal temperatures.

Triuranium octoxide is slowly oxidized to uranium trioxide under high pressures of oxygen:

U_{3}O_{8} + 1/_{2} O_{2} → 3 UO_{3}

Triuranium octoxide is attacked by hydrofluoric acid at 250 °C to form uranyl fluoride:

U_{3}O_{8} + 6 HF + 1/_{2} O_{2} → 3 UO_{2}F_{2} + 3 H_{2}O

Triuranium octoxide can also be attacked by a solution of hydrochloric acid and hydrogen peroxide to form uranyl chloride.

== Structure ==
Triuranium octoxide has multiple polymorphs, including α-U_{3}O_{8}, β-U_{3}O_{8}, γ-U_{3}O_{8}, and a non-stoichiometric high-pressure phase with the fluorite structure.

=== Alpha ===
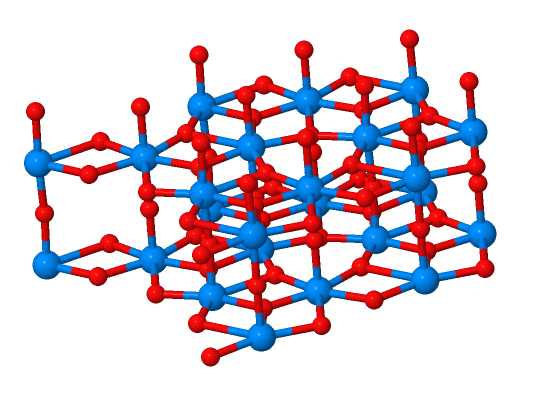
The crystal structure of α-U_{3}O_{8}.

α-U_{3}O_{8} is the most commonly encountered polymorph of triuranium octoxide, being the most stable under standard conditions. At room temperature, it has an orthorhombic pseudo-hexagonal structure, with lattice constants a=6.72Å, b=11.97Å, c=4.15Å and space group Amm2. At higher temperatures (~350 °C), it transitions into a true hexagonal structure, with space group P6̅2m.

α-U_{3}O_{8} is made up of layers of uranium and oxygen atoms. Each layer has the same U-O structure, and oxygen bridges connect corresponding uranium atoms in different layers. Within each layer, the U sites are surrounded by five oxygen atoms. This means that each U atom is bonded to seven oxygen atoms total, giving U a coordination geometry of pentagonal bipyramidal.

=== Beta ===
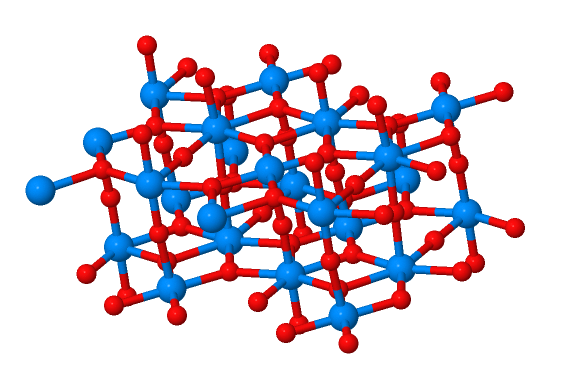
The crystal structure of β-U_{3}O_{8}.

β-U_{3}O_{8} can be formed by heating α-U_{3}O_{8} to 1350 °C and slowly cooling. The structure of β-U_{3}O_{8} is similar to that of α-U_{3}O_{8}, having a similar sheet-like arrangement and similar lattice constants (a=7.07Å, b=11.45Å, c=8.30Å [c/2=4.15Å]). It also has an orthorhombic cell, with space group Cmcm.

Like α-U_{3}O_{8}, β-U_{3}O_{8} has a layered structure containing uranium and oxygen atoms, but unlike α-U_{3}O_{8}, adjacent layers have a different structure- instead, every other layer has the same arrangement of U and O atoms. It also features oxygen bridges between U and O atoms in adjacent layers, though instead of all U atoms having a geometry of pentagonal bipyramidal, 2 U atoms per formula unit have distinct pentagonal bipyramidal coordination geometries, and the other U atom has a coordination geometry of tetragonal bipyramidal.

=== Gamma ===
γ-U_{3}O_{8} is formed at around 200-300 °C and at 16,000 atmospheres of pressure. Very little information on it is available.

=== Fluorite-type ===
A high-pressure phase of U_{3}O_{8} with a hyperstoichiometric fluorite-type structure is formed at pressures greater than 8.1 GPa. During the phase transition, the volume of the solid decreases by more than 20%. The high-pressure phase is stable under ambient conditions, in which it is 28% denser than α-U_{3}O_{8}.

This phase has a cubic structure with a high amount of defects. Its formula is UO_{2+x}, where x ≈ 0.8.

== Natural occurrence ==
Triuranium octoxide can be found in small quantities (~0.01-0.05%) in the mineral pitchblende.

== Uses ==
=== Production of uranium hexafluoride ===
Triuranium octoxide can be used to produce uranium hexafluoride, which is used for the enrichment of uranium in the nuclear fuel cycle. In the dry process, common in the United States, triuranium octoxide is purified through calcination, then crushed. Another process, called the wet process, common outside the U.S., involves dissolving U_{3}O_{8} in nitric acid to form uranyl nitrate, followed by calcining to uranium trioxide in a fluidized bed reactor.

No matter which method is used, the uranium oxide is then reduced using hydrogen gas to form uranium dioxide, which is then reacted with hydrofluoric acid to form uranium tetrafluoride and then with fluorine gas to produce uranium hexafluoride. This can then be separated into uranium-235 and uranium-238 hexafluoride.

U_{3}O_{8} + 2 H_{2} → 3 UO_{2} + 2 H_{2}O

UO_{3} + H_{2} → UO_{2} + H_{2}O

UO_{2} + 4 HF → UF_{4} + 2 H_{2}O

UF_{4} + F_{2} → UF_{6}

== Hazards ==
Triuranium octoxide is a carcinogen and is toxic by inhalation and ingestion with repeated exposure. If consumed, it targets the kidney, liver, lungs, and brain, and causes irritation upon contact with the skin and eyes. It should only be handled with adequate ventilation. In addition, it is also radioactive, being an alpha emitter.
