= Neptunium trioxide =

Names
- Other names Neptunium(VI) oxide

Identifiers
CAS Number	65597-34-4

Properties
Chemical formula	NpO_{3}
Molar mass	285 g·mol^{−1}
Appearance	dark brown crystals (hydrate)
Solubility in water	insoluble

Related compounds
Other cations	Plutonium trioxide; Uranium trioxide
- Except where otherwise noted, data are given for materials in their standard state (at 25 °C [77 °F], 100 kPa). Infobox references

Neptunium trioxide is an inorganic compound of neptunium and oxygen with the chemical formula NpO_{3}.

== Synthesis ==
Neptunium trioxide can be obtained by oxidating neptunium(V) nitrate solution in a molten eutectic mixture of potassium and lithium nitrates with ozone at 150 °C. The reaction by-products are washed out with water. Other methods are also known.

== Physical properties ==
Neptunium trioxide is highly volatile and exists only in the hydrated form. It is insoluble in water. It forms dark brown hydrate crystals of variable composition NpO_{3}•xH_{2}O, where x = 1–2. The NpO_{3}•H_{2}O hydrate crystals are of orthorhombic system.
