= Sodium diuranate =

Mixed oxide of uranium and sodium

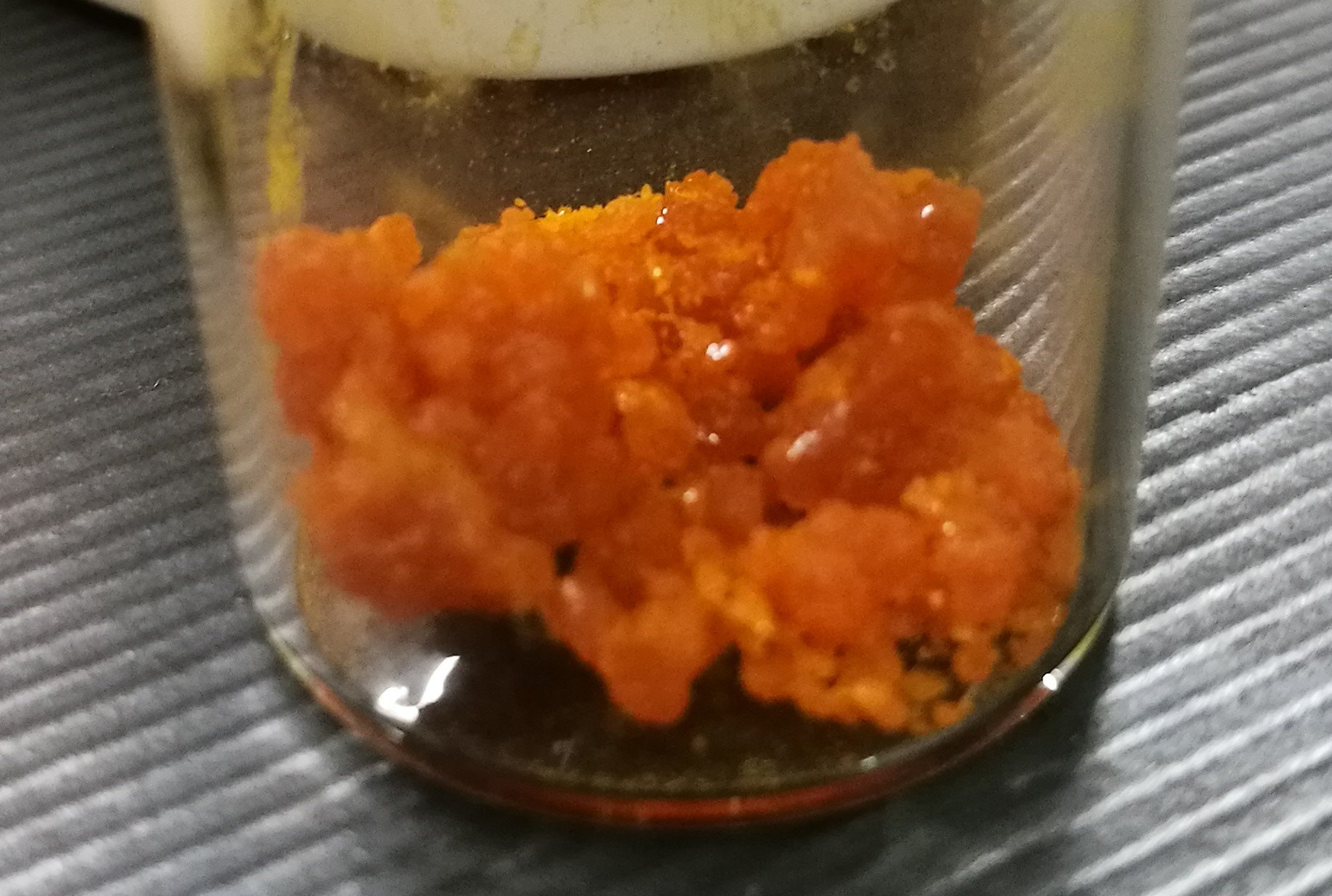

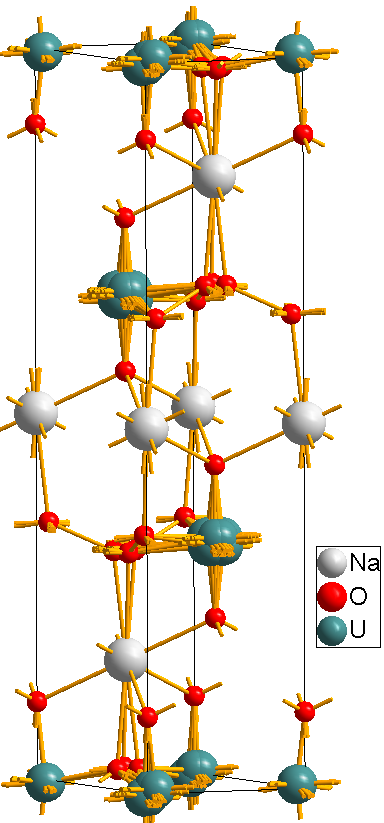

Identifiers
CAS Number	13721-34-1
3D model (JSmol)	Interactive image
ECHA InfoCard	100.033.882
EC Number	237-286-3
PubChem CID	102601642
UNII	563BIJ19PP
- InChI: InChI=1S/2Na.7O.2U/q2*+1;;;;;;2*-1;; Key: FJBIAWYRFOSYRU-UHFFFAOYSA-N
- SMILES: [O-][U](=O)(=O)O[U](=O)(=O)[O-].[Na+].[Na+]

Properties
Chemical formula	Na_{2}U_{2}O_{7}
Density	6.44 g/cm^{3}
Melting point	1,646 °C (2,995 °F; 1,919 K)
- Except where otherwise noted, data are given for materials in their standard state (at 25 °C [77 °F], 100 kPa). verify (what is ?) Infobox references

Sodium diuranate, also known as the yellow oxide of uranium, is an inorganic chemical compound with the chemical formula Na_{2}U_{2}O_{7}. It is a sodium salt of a diuranate anion. It forms a hexahydrate Na_{2}U_{2}O_{7}·6H_{2}O. Sodium diuranate is commonly referred to by the initials SDU. Along with ammonium diuranate it was a component in early yellowcakes. The ratio of the two compounds is determined by process conditions; however, yellowcake is now largely a mix of uranium oxides.

== Preparation ==
In the classical procedure for extracting uranium, pitchblende is broken up and mixed with sulfuric and nitric acids. The uranium dissolves to form uranyl sulfate and sodium carbonate is added to precipitate impurities. If the uranium in the ore is in the tetravalent oxidation state, an oxidiser is added to oxidise it to the hexavalent oxidation state, and sodium hydroxide is then added to make the uranium precipitate as sodium diuranate. The alkaline process of milling uranium ores involves precipitating sodium uranate from the pregnant leaching solution to produce the semi-refined product referred to as yellowcake.

These older methods of extracting uranium from its uraninite ores has been replaced in current practice by such procedures as solvent extraction, ion exchange, and volatility methods.

Sodium uranate may be obtained in the amorphous form by heating together urano-uranic oxide and sodium chlorate; or by heating sodium uranyl acetate or carbonate. The crystalline form is produced by adding the green oxide in small quantities to fused sodium chloride, or by dissolving the amorphous form in fused sodium chloride, and allowing crystallization to take place. It yields reddish-yellow to greenish-yellow prisms or leaflets.

== Uses ==
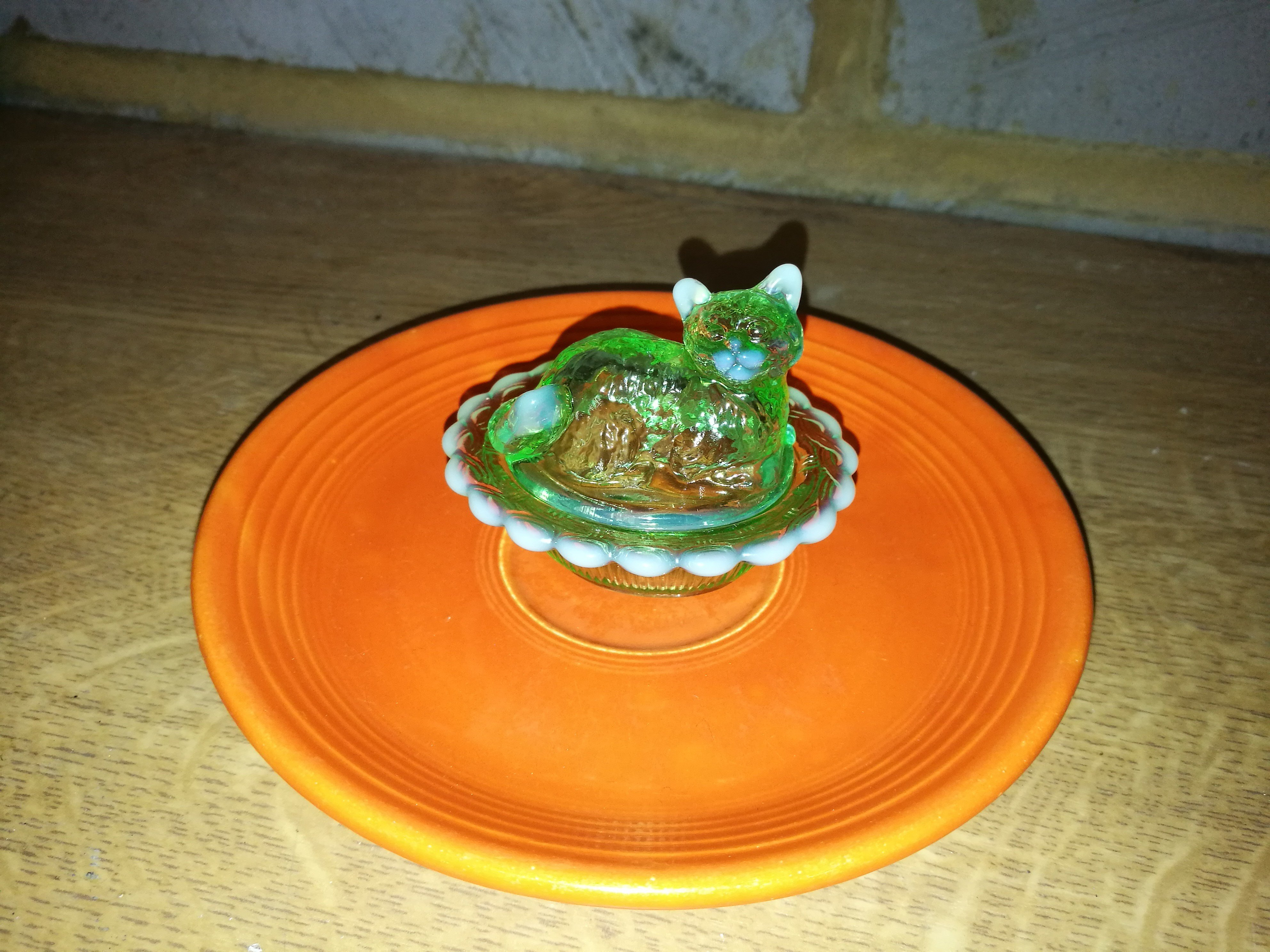
A uranium glass bowl in the shape of a cat, on top of a fiestaware plate, both previous uses of sodium diuranate.

In the past it was widely used to produce uranium glass or vaseline glass, the sodium salt dissolving easily into the silica matrix during the firing of the initial melt.

It was also used in porcelain dentures to give them a fluorescence similar to that of natural teeth and once used in pottery to produce ivory to yellow shades in glazes. It was added to these products as a mix with cerium oxide. The final uranium composition was from 0.008 to 0.1% by weight uranium with an average of about 0.02%. The practice appears to have stopped in the late 1980s.
