= Magnesium diuranate =

Identifiers
CAS Number	13568-61-1
3D model (JSmol)	Interactive image
PubChem CID	57511446
- InChI: InChI=1S/Mg.7O.2U Key: ZLNIXXOMOXJVRL-UHFFFAOYSA-N
- SMILES: O=[U]1(=O)O[Mg]O[U](=O)(=O)O1

Properties
Chemical formula	MgU_{2}O_{7}
Molar mass	612.36 g·mol^{−1}
- Except where otherwise noted, data are given for materials in their standard state (at 25 °C [77 °F], 100 kPa). Infobox references

Magnesium diuranate (MgU_{2}O_{7}) is a compound of uranium. It is known in the uranium refining industry as "MDU" and forms the major part of some yellowcake mixtures. Yellowcakes are an intermediate product in the uranium refining process.

To produce this form of yellowcake, crushed ore is mixed with hot water to a 58% solids slurry. The solids slurry is then processed through a series of tanks, where sulfuric acid, sodium chlorate, and steam are used to extract the uranium from the solids slurry. The average leaching efficiency for this process is 98.5%. The uranium-bearing solution is then decanted and directed to a solvent extraction (SX) process for further purification. In this extraction step, the dissolved uranium is transferred from the feed solution into the organic solvent. Next a stripping step recovers the uranium into a sodium chloride aqueous phase after which the barren solvent is recycled. The average efficiency of the SX circuit is 99.9%. The high-grade “pregnant” strip solution from SX goes to the next stage where magnesia slurry is added to precipitate magnesium diuranate. The yellow cake precipitate is then thickened, dried, re-crushed and packed into industry standard 220 litre steel drums for shipment to customers.

As with all yellowcake process the selection of this end product is dependent on the properties of the ore to be processed.
