= Uranium dioxide =

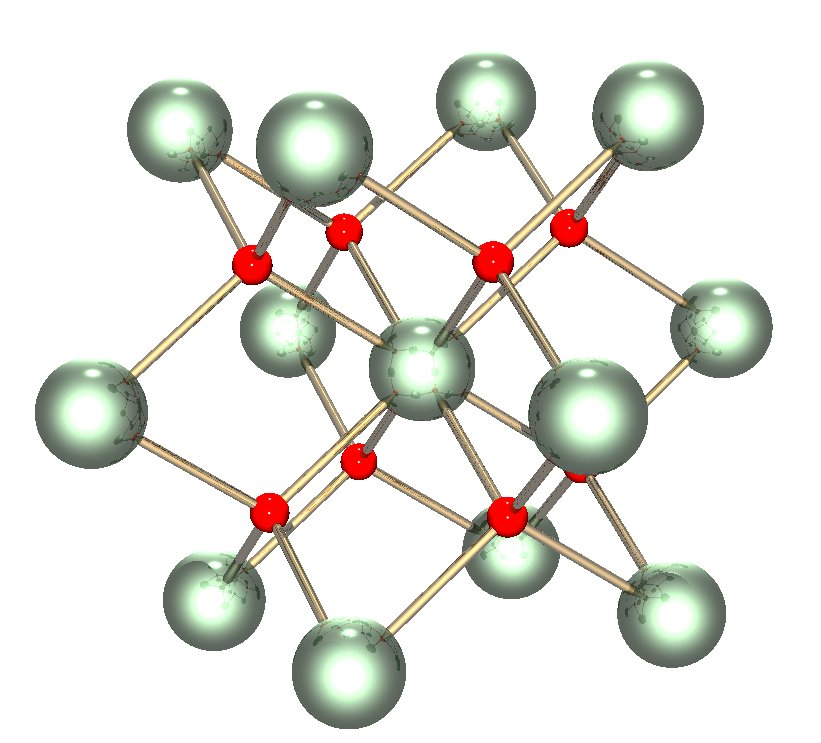

Names
- IUPAC names Uranium dioxide Uranium(IV) oxide
- Other names Urania; Uranous oxide

Identifiers
CAS Number	1344-57-6
3D model (JSmol)	Interactive image
ChemSpider	10454
ECHA InfoCard	100.014.273
EC Number	215-700-3
PubChem CID	10916
RTECS number	YR4705000
UNII	L70487KUZO
CompTox Dashboard (EPA)	DTXSID8061682
- InChI: InChI=1S/2O.U Key: FCTBKIHDJGHPPO-UHFFFAOYSA-N
- SMILES: O=[U]=O

Properties
Chemical formula	UO_{2}
Molar mass	270.03 g/mol
Appearance	black powder
Density	10.97 g/cm^{3}
Melting point	2,865 °C (5,189 °F; 3,138 K)
Solubility in water	insoluble

Structure
Crystal structure	Fluorite (cubic), cF12
Space group	Fm3̅m, No. 225
Lattice constant	a = 547.1 pm
Coordination geometry	Tetrahedral (O^{2−}); cubic (U^{IV})

Thermochemistry
Std molar entropy (S^{⦵}_{298})	78 J·mol^{−1}·K^{−1}
Std enthalpy of formation (Δ_{f}H^{⦵}_{298})	−1084 kJ·mol^{−1}

Hazards
- GHS labelling
Pictograms	(GHS06: Toxic) (GHS08: Health hazard) (GHS09: Environmental hazard)
Signal word	Danger
Hazard statements	H300, H330, H373, H410
Precautionary statements	P260, P264, P270, P271, P273, P284, P301+P310, P304+P340, P310, P314, P320, P321, P330, P391, P403+P233, P405, P501
NFPA 704 (fire diamond)	4 0 0
Flash point	N/A
Safety data sheet (SDS)	ICSC 1251

Related compounds
Other anions	Uranium(IV) sulfide Uranium(IV) selenide
Other cations	Protactinium(IV) oxide Neptunium(IV) oxide
Related uranium oxides	Triuranium octoxide Uranium trioxide
- Except where otherwise noted, data are given for materials in their standard state (at 25 °C [77 °F], 100 kPa). verify (what is ?) Infobox references

Uranium dioxide or uranium(IV) oxide (UO_{2}), also known as urania or uranous oxide, is an oxide of uranium, and is a black, radioactive, crystalline powder that naturally occurs in the mineral uraninite. It is used in nuclear fuel rods in nuclear reactors. A mixture of uranium and plutonium dioxides is used as MOX fuel. It has been used as an orange, yellow, green, and black color in ceramic glazes and glass.

== Production ==
Uranium dioxide is produced by reducing uranium trioxide with hydrogen. This reaction often creates triuranium octoxide as an intermediate.

UO_{3} + H_{2} → UO_{2} + H_{2}O at 700 °C (973 K)

This reaction plays an important part in the creation of nuclear fuel through nuclear reprocessing and uranium enrichment.

== Chemistry ==
=== Structure ===
The solid is isostructural with (has the same structure as) fluorite (calcium fluoride), where each U is surrounded by eight O nearest neighbors in a cubic arrangement. In addition, the dioxides of cerium, thorium, and the transuranic elements from neptunium through californium have the same structures. No other elemental dioxides have the fluorite structure. Upon melting, the measured average U-O coordination reduces from 8 in the crystalline solid (UO_{8} cubes), down to 6.7±0.5 (at 3270 K) in the melt. Models consistent with these measurements show the melt to consist mainly of UO_{6} and UO_{7} polyhedral units, where roughly 2/3 of the connections between polyhedra are corner sharing and 1/3 are edge sharing.

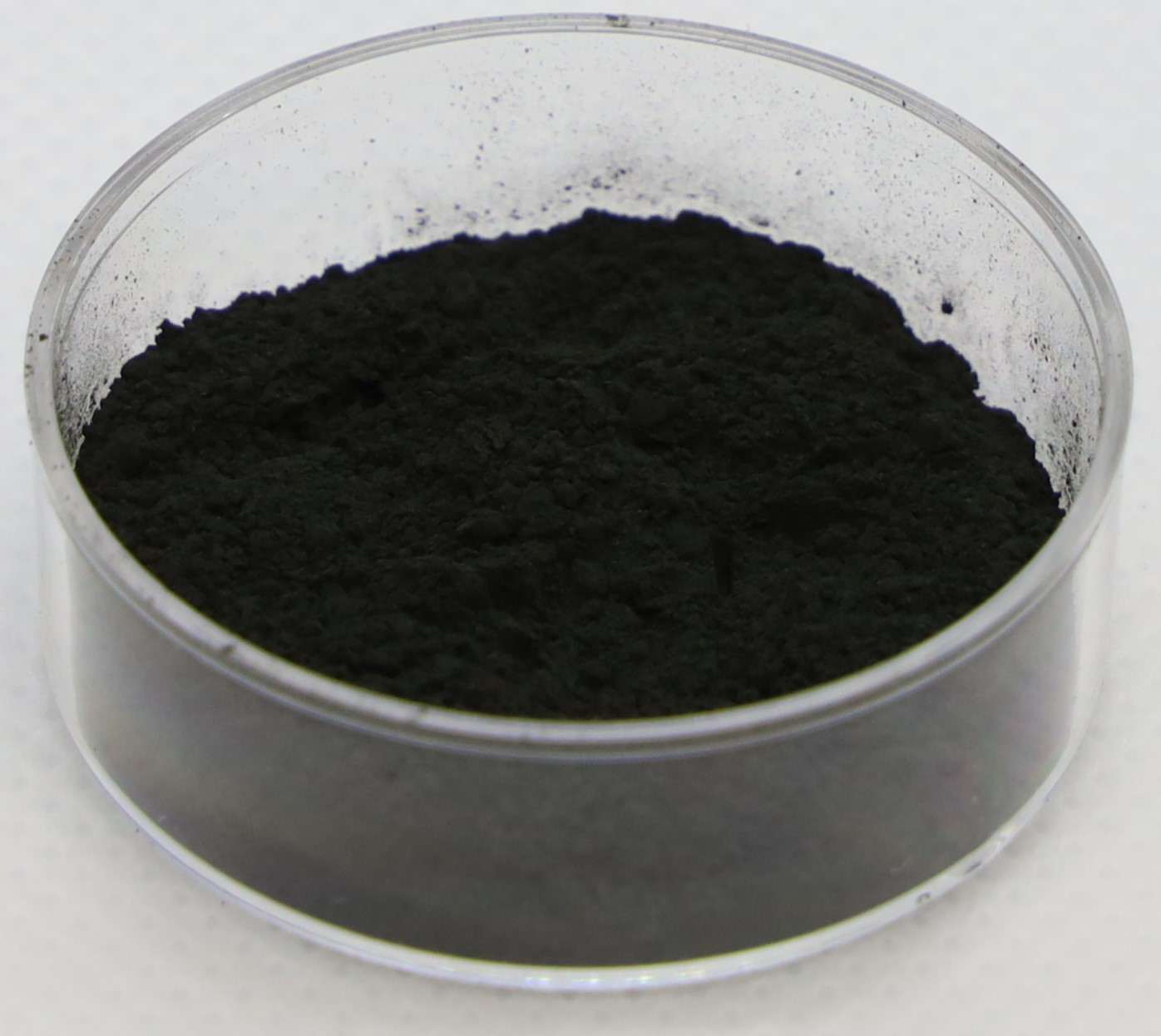
Uranium dioxide

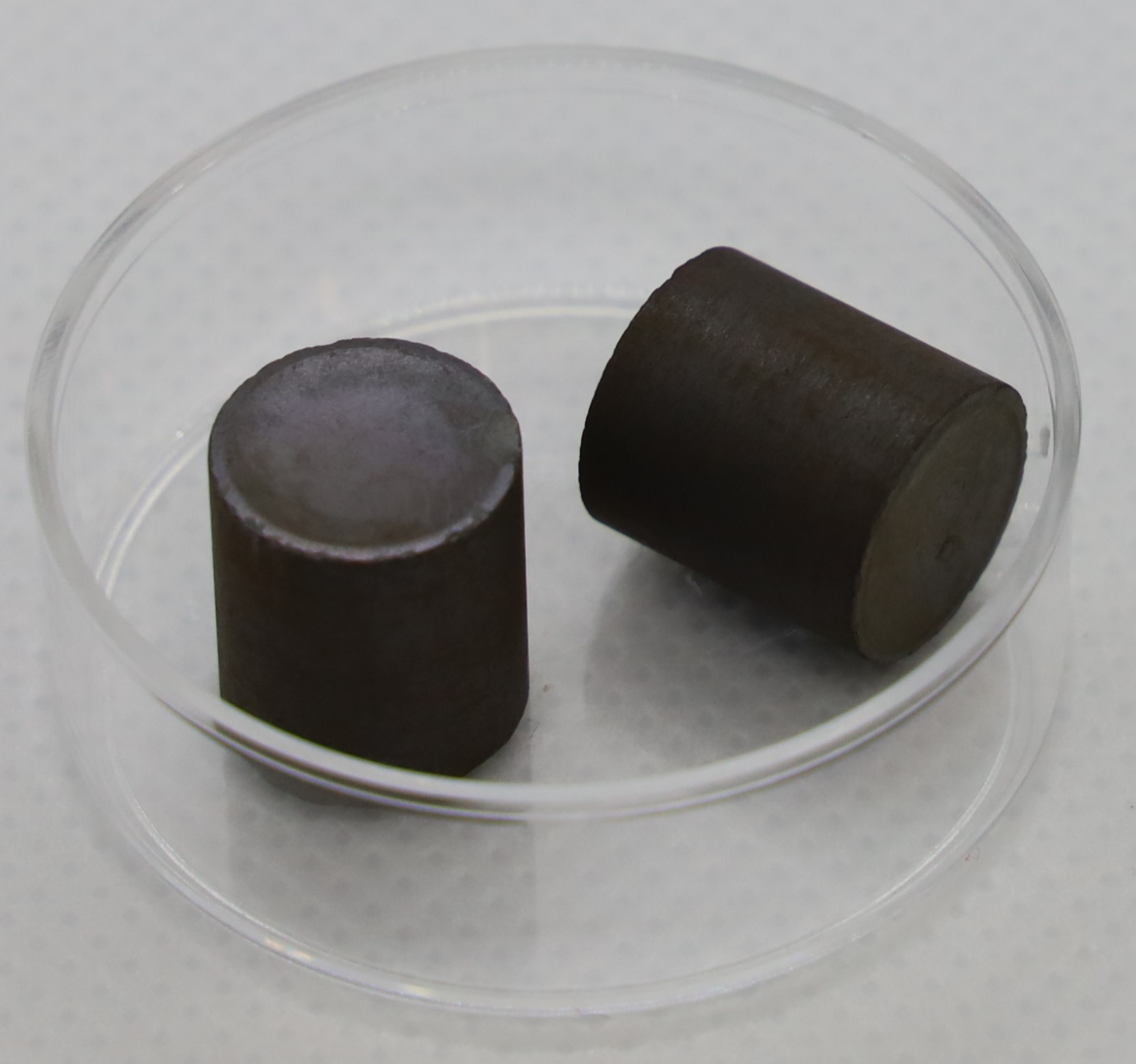
Sintered uranium dioxide pellet

=== Oxidation ===
Uranium dioxide is oxidized in contact with oxygen to form triuranium octoxide:

3 UO_{2} + O_{2} → U_{3}O_{8} at 250 °C (523 K)

The electrochemistry of uranium dioxide has been investigated in detail as the galvanic corrosion of uranium dioxide controls the rate at which used nuclear fuel dissolves. See spent nuclear fuel for further details. Water increases the oxidation rate of plutonium and uranium metals.

=== Reaction with carbon ===
Uranium dioxide reacts with carbon at high temperatures, forming uranium carbide and carbon monoxide.

UO_{2} + 4 C → UC_{2} + 2 CO

This process must be done under an inert gas as uranium carbide is easily oxidized back into uranium oxide.

== Uses ==
=== Nuclear fuel ===
UO_{2} is used mainly as nuclear fuel, specifically as UO_{2} or as a mixture of UO_{2} and PuO_{2} (plutonium dioxide) called a mixed oxide (MOX fuel), in the form of fuel rods in nuclear reactors.

The thermal conductivity of uranium dioxide is very low when compared with elemental uranium, uranium nitride, uranium carbide and zircaloy cladding material as well as most uranium-based alloys. This low thermal conductivity can result in localised overheating in the centres of fuel pellets.

The graph below shows the different temperature gradients in different fuel compounds. For these fuels, the thermal power density is the same and the diameter of all the pellets are the same.

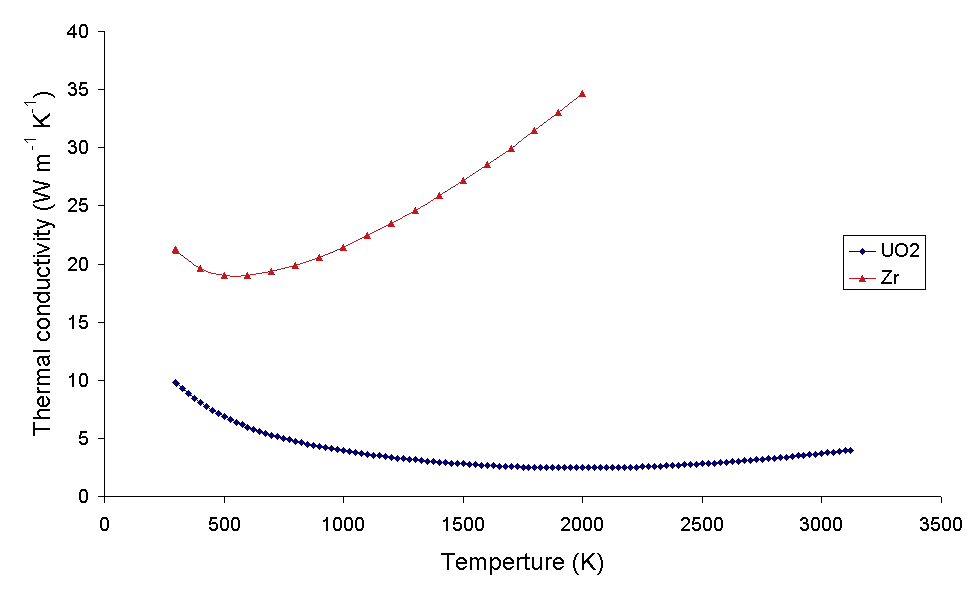
The thermal conductivity of zirconium metal and uranium dioxide as a function of temperature

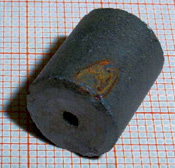
Uranium oxide fuel pellet

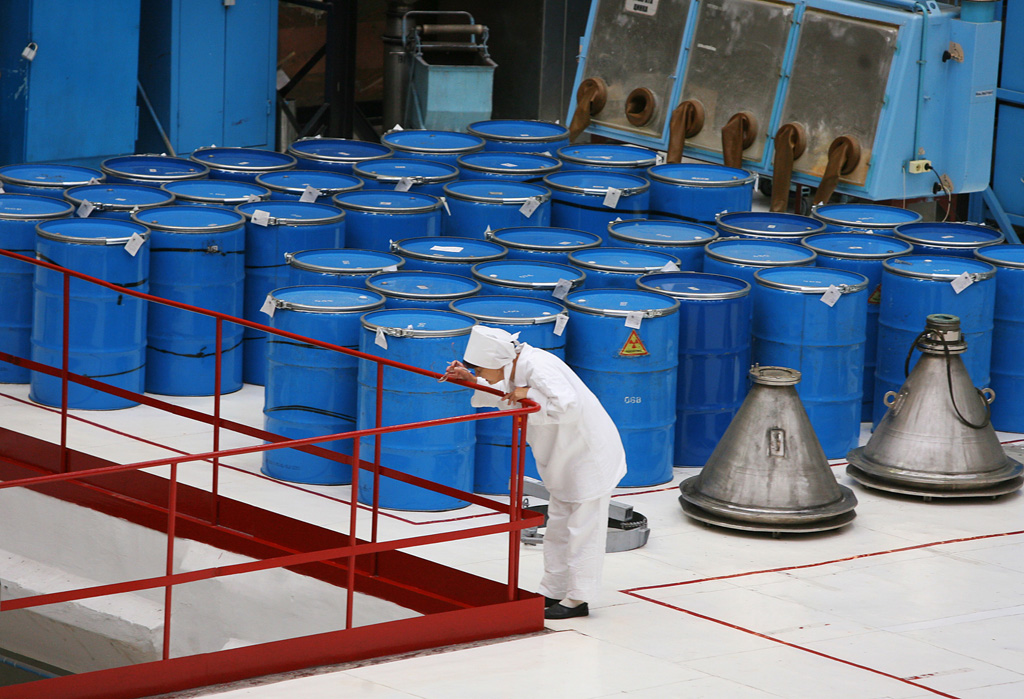
Starting material containers for uranium dioxide fuel pellet production at a plant in Russia

=== Color for glass ceramic glaze ===
Geiger counter (kit without housing) audibly reacting to an orange Fiestaware shard.

Uranium oxide (urania) was used to color glass and ceramics prior to World War II, and until the applications of radioactivity were discovered this was its main use. In 1958 the military in both the US and Europe allowed its commercial use again as depleted uranium, and its use began again on a more limited scale. Urania-based ceramic glazes are dark green or black when fired in a reduction or when UO_{2} is used; more commonly it is used in oxidation to produce bright yellow, orange and red glazes. Orange-colored Fiestaware is a well-known example of a product with a urania-colored glaze. Uranium glass is pale green to yellow and often has strong fluorescent properties. Urania has also been used in formulations of enamel and porcelain.

=== Other uses ===
Prior to the realisation of the harmfulness of radiation, uranium was included in false teeth and dentures, as its slight fluorescence made the dentures appear more like real teeth in a variety of lighting conditions.

Depleted UO_{2} (DUO_{2}) can be used as a material for radiation shielding. For example, DUCRETE is a "heavy concrete" material where gravel is replaced with uranium dioxide aggregate; this material is investigated for use for casks for radioactive waste. Casks can be also made of DUO_{2}-steel cermet, a composite material made of an aggregate of uranium dioxide serving as radiation shielding, graphite and/or silicon carbide serving as neutron radiation absorber and moderator, and steel as the matrix, whose high thermal conductivity allows easy removal of decay heat.

Depleted uranium dioxide can be also used as a catalyst, e.g. for degradation of volatile organic compounds in gaseous phase, oxidation of methane to methanol, and removal of sulfur from petroleum. It has high efficiency and long-term stability when used to destroy VOCs when compared with some of the commercial catalysts, such as precious metals, TiO_{2}, and Co_{3}O_{4} catalysts. Much research is being done in this area, DU being favoured for the uranium component due to its low radioactivity.

As of 2013, the use of uranium dioxide as a material for rechargeable batteries is being investigated. The batteries could have a high power density and a reduction potential of -4.7 V per cell.

Uranium dioxide displays strong piezomagnetism in the antiferromagnetic state, observed at cryogenic temperatures below 30 kelvins. Accordingly, the linear magnetostriction found in UO_{2} changes sign with the applied magnetic field and exhibits magnetoelastic memory switching phenomena at record high switch-fields of 180,000 Oe. The microscopic origin of the material magnetic properties lays in the face-centered-cubic crystal lattice symmetry of uranium atoms, and its response to applied magnetic fields.

=== Semiconductor properties ===
The band gap of uranium dioxide is comparable to those of silicon and gallium arsenide, near the optimum for efficiency vs band gap curve for absorption of solar radiation, suggesting its possible use for very efficient solar cells based on Schottky diode structure; it also absorbs at five different wavelengths, including infrared, further enhancing its efficiency. Its intrinsic conductivity at room temperature is about the same as of single crystal silicon.

The dielectric constant of uranium dioxide is about 21.5, which is almost twice as high as of silicon (11.7) and GaAs (12.4). This is an advantage over Si and GaAs in the construction of integrated circuits, as it may allow higher density integration with higher breakdown voltages and with lower susceptibility to the CMOS tunnelling breakdown.

The Seebeck coefficient of uranium dioxide at room temperature is about -750 μV/K, a value significantly higher than the -270 μV/K of thallium tin telluride (Tl_{2}SnTe_{5}) and thallium germanium telluride (Tl_{2}GeTe_{5}) and the −170 μV/K (n-type) / 160 μV/K (p-type) of bismuth telluride, other materials promising for applications like thermoelectric power generation.

The radioactive decay impact of the ^{235}U and ^{238}U on its semiconducting properties was not measured as of 2005. Due to the slow decay rate of these isotopes, it should not meaningfully influence the properties of uranium dioxide solar cells and thermoelectric devices, but it may become an important factor for high-performance integrated circuits. Use of depleted uranium oxide is necessary for this reason. The capture of alpha particles emitted during radioactive decay as helium atoms in the crystal lattice may also cause gradual long-term changes in its properties.

The stoichiometry of the material dramatically influences its electrical properties. For example, the electrical conductivity of UO_{1.994} is orders of magnitude lower at higher temperatures than the conductivity of UO_{2.001}.

Uranium dioxide, like U_{3}O_{8}, is a ceramic material capable of withstanding high temperatures (about 2300 °C, in comparison with at most 200 °C for silicon or GaAs).

Uranium dioxide is also resistant to radiation damage, making it useful for special military and aerospace applications.

A Schottky diode of U_{3}O_{8} and a p-n-p transistor of UO_{2} were successfully manufactured in a laboratory.

== Health dangers ==
Uranium dioxide is dangerous in two ways: heavy metal toxicity, and radiation. Uranium dioxide decays primarily by emission of alpha particles and gamma radiation, which is cumulatively dangerous to biologic organisms including animals and humans. It can be severely toxic or even fatal if swallowed, inhaled, absorbed through the skin and eyes.

If inhaled, short term effects include irreversible kidney damage or acute necrotic arterial lesions. Inhalation of large particles of uranium materials or chronic exposure to uranium powders may result in radiation damage to internal tissues, especially the lungs and bones. Long term, in addition to effects from short term exposure, damage may include pulmonary fibrosis and malignant pulmonary neoplasia, anemia and blood disorders, liver damage, bone effects, sterility, and cancers. Skin contact with uranium powders may result in dermatitis. If ingested, it may cause kidney damage or acute necrotic arterial lesions. Ingestion may also affect the liver, and cause radiation damage to internal tissues.

== See also ==
- Cleveite
- Ducrete
- Uranium oxide
- Uranium glass
- Uranium tile
