= Ammonium diuranate =

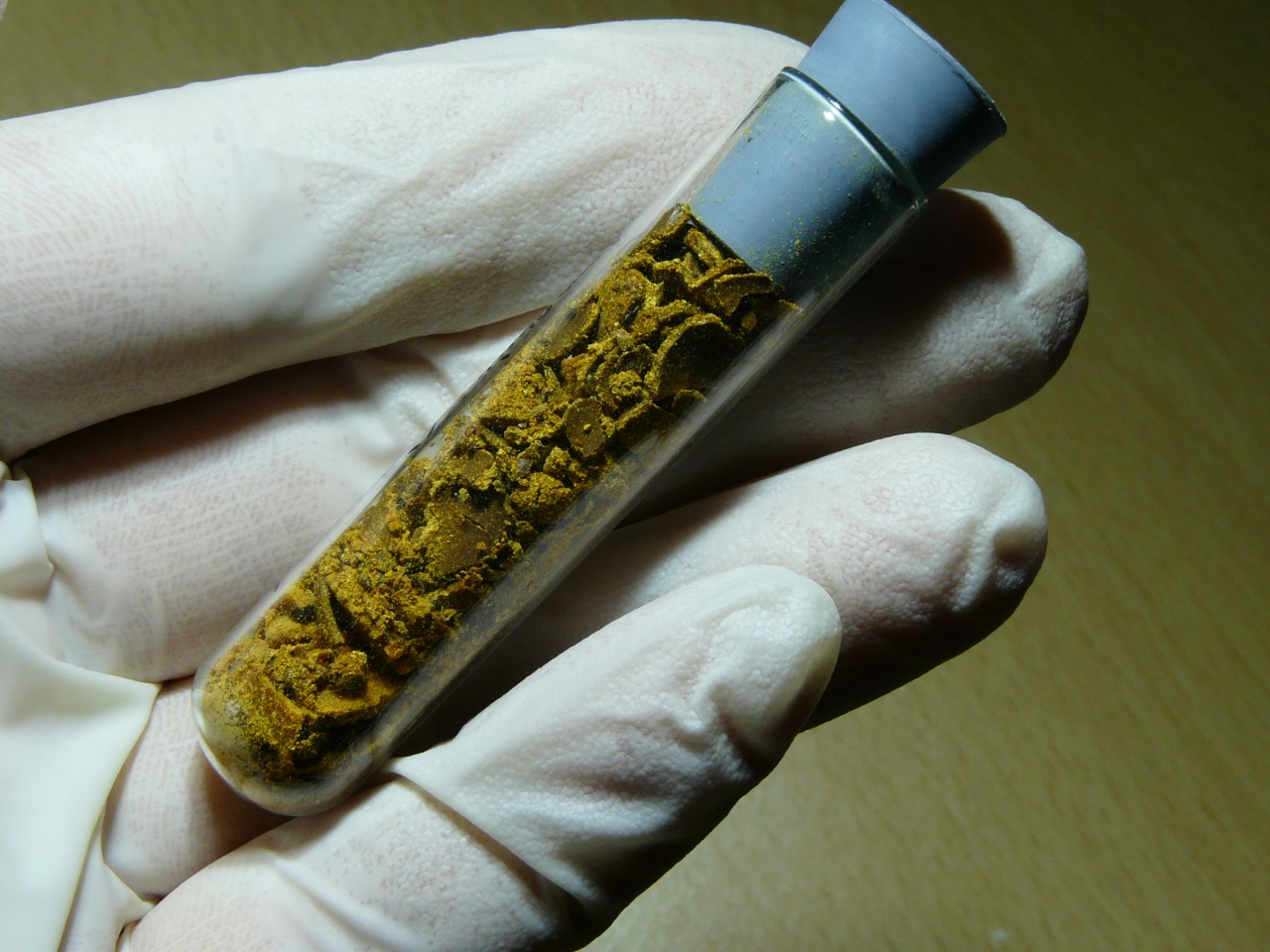

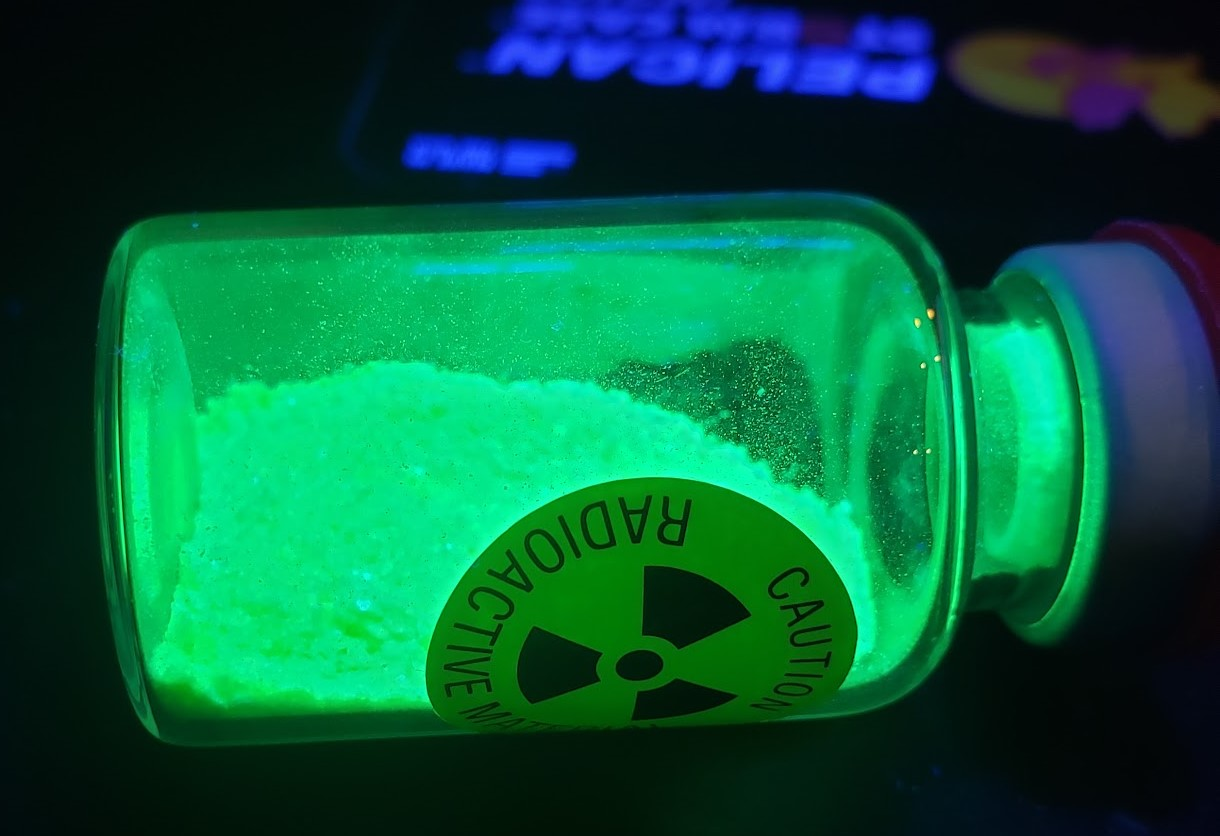

Identifiers
CAS Number	7783-22-4
ChemSpider	21257707
ECHA InfoCard	100.029.078
PubChem CID	197096
UNII	39Y3LFK95B
- InChI: InChI=1S/2H3N.7O.2U/h2*1H3;;;;;;;;;/q;;7*-2;;/p+2 Key: ZAASRHQPRFFWCS-UHFFFAOYSA-P

Properties
Chemical formula	(NH_{4})_{2}U_{2}O_{7}
Molar mass	624.129 g·mol^{−1}
- Except where otherwise noted, data are given for materials in their standard state (at 25 °C [77 °F], 100 kPa). verify (what is ?) Infobox references

Ammonium diuranate or (ADU) ((NH_{4})_{2}U_{2}O_{7}), is one of the intermediate chemical forms of uranium produced during yellowcake production. The name "yellowcake" originally given to this bright yellow salt, now applies to mixtures of uranium oxides which are actually hardly ever yellow. It also is an intermediate in mixed-oxide (MOX) fuel fabrication. Although it is usually called "ammonium diuranate" as though it has a "diuranate" ion U_{2}O^{2−}_{7}, this is not necessarily the case. It can also be called diammonium diuranium heptaoxide. The structure was theorized to be similar to that of uranium trioxide dihydrate. Recent literature has shown that the structure more closely resembles the mineral metaschoepite, the partially dehydrated form of schoepite.

It is precipitated by adding aqueous ammonium hydroxide after uranium extraction by tertiary amines in kerosene. This precipitate is then thickened and centrifuged before being calcined to uranium oxide. Canadian practice favours the production of uranium oxide from ammonium diuranate, rather than from uranyl nitrate as is the case elsewhere.

Ammonium diuranate was once used to produce colored glazes in ceramics. However, when being fired this will decompose to uranium oxide, so the uranate was only used as a lower-cost material than the fully purified uranium oxide.
