= Yellowcake =

Uranium concentrate powder

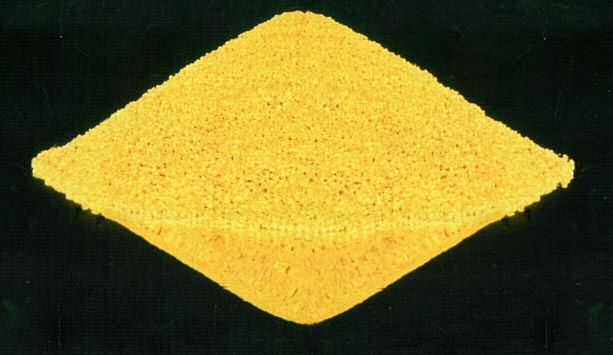

Names
- Other names urania

Identifiers
CAS Number	1344-57-6
UNII	L70487KUZO

Properties
Chemical formula	variable, see text
Appearance	Yellow granules (as Yellowcake); Brown or black granules (UO_{2} and others)
Melting point	2,880 °C (5,220 °F; 3,150 K)
- Except where otherwise noted, data are given for materials in their standard state (at 25 °C [77 °F], 100 kPa). verify (what is ?) Infobox references

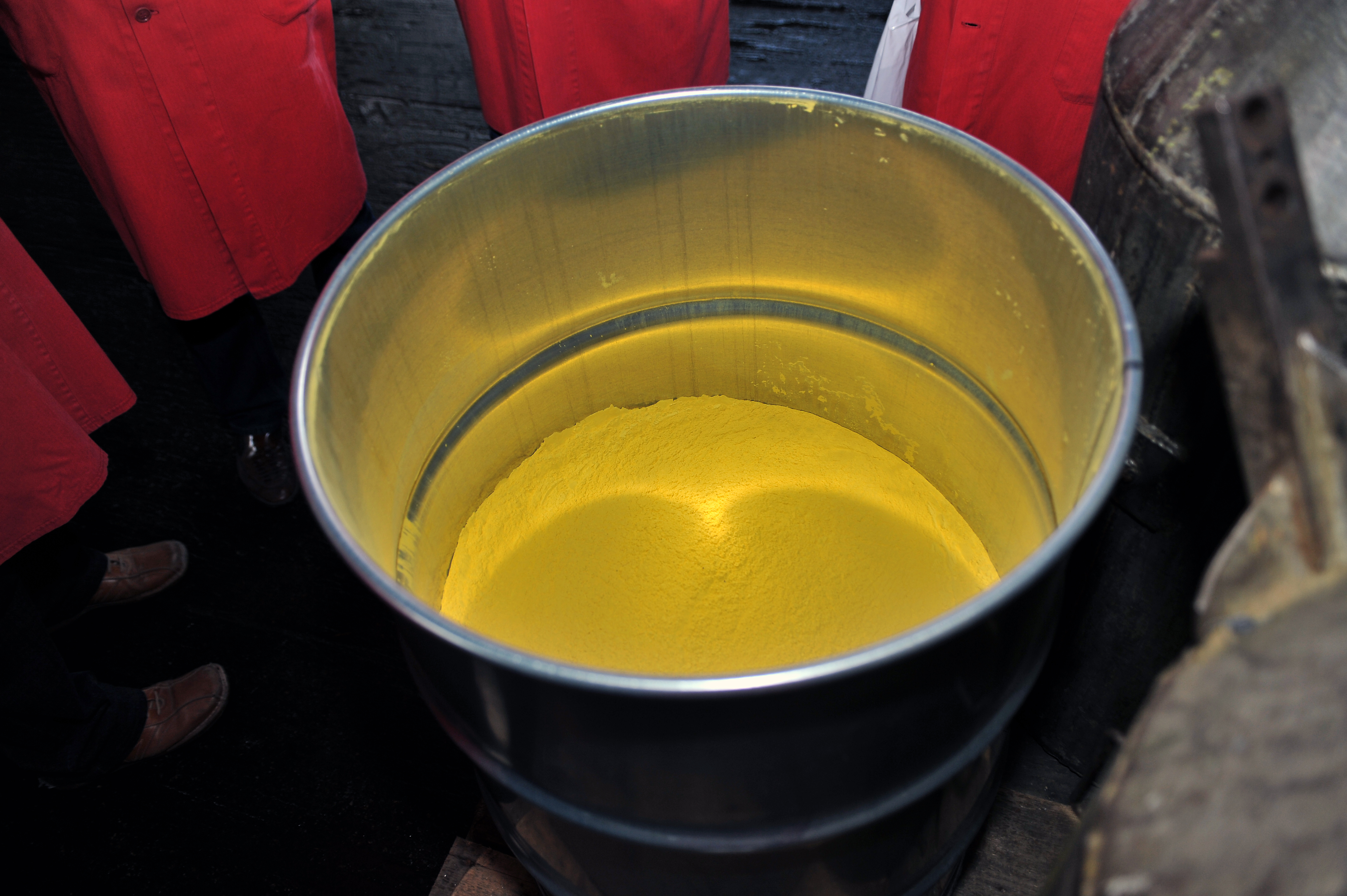
Yellowcake. Note its texture's resemblance to a baked cake.

Yellowcake, also known as urania, is a type of powdered uranium concentrate obtained from leach solutions, representing an intermediate step in the processing of uranium ores. This material is produced after uranium mining but before either fuel fabrication or uranium enrichment. Yellowcake concentrates are created through various extraction and refining methods that vary depending on the ore types. The production involves milling and chemical processing of uranium ore, resulting in a coarse powder that is insoluble in water and has a pungent odor. Yellowcake typically contains about 80% uranium oxide and melts at approximately 2880 °C.

== Production process ==
Traditional uranium mining involves extracting raw uranium ore through conventional methods, which remains common practice at many sites. The production process begins with crushing the ore to a fine powder using crushers and grinders to create "pulped" ore. This material then undergoes treatment with concentrated acid, alkaline, or peroxide solutions to leach out the uranium. In modern operations, approximately half of yellowcake production utilizes in situ leaching, where solutions are pumped directly through uranium deposits without physical excavation. The resulting solution is then dried and filtered to produce yellowcake. Despite its name, modern yellowcake is typically brown or black rather than yellow; the term originates from the color and texture of concentrates from early mining operations.

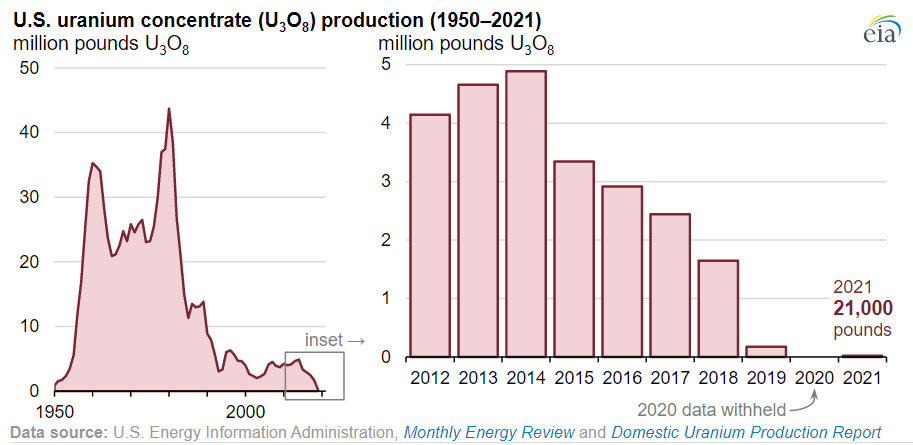
US triuranium octoxide (U_{3}O_{8}) production, 1950–2021

== Composition ==
Early yellowcake compositions were not well characterized. As late as 1968, the U.S. Bureau of Mines defined yellowcake simply as "certain uranium concentrates ... the final precipitate from the milling process", considered to be ammonium diuranate or sodium diuranate. The actual composition varies significantly based on leaching agents and precipitation conditions. Identified compounds in yellowcake include uranyl hydroxide, uranyl sulfate, sodium para-uranate, and uranyl peroxide, along with various uranium oxides.

Yellowcake production occurs in all countries where uranium ore is mined.

=== Further processing ===
Yellowcake serves as feedstock for nuclear fuel production. For use in reactors, it is smelted into purified UO_{2} for fabrication into fuel rods, particularly for pressurized heavy-water reactors and other systems utilizing natural unenriched uranium.

For enrichment purposes, uranium oxides are converted to uranium hexafluoride gas (UF_{6}) through fluorination. This gas then undergoes isotope separation via gaseous diffusion or gas centrifuge processes. These methods can produce low-enriched uranium (up to 20% U-235) suitable for most commercial power reactors. Additional processing yields highly enriched uranium (20% or more U-235) for naval propulsion systems. Further refinement can produce weapons-grade uranium (typically >90% U-235) for nuclear weapons.

== Radioactivity and safety ==
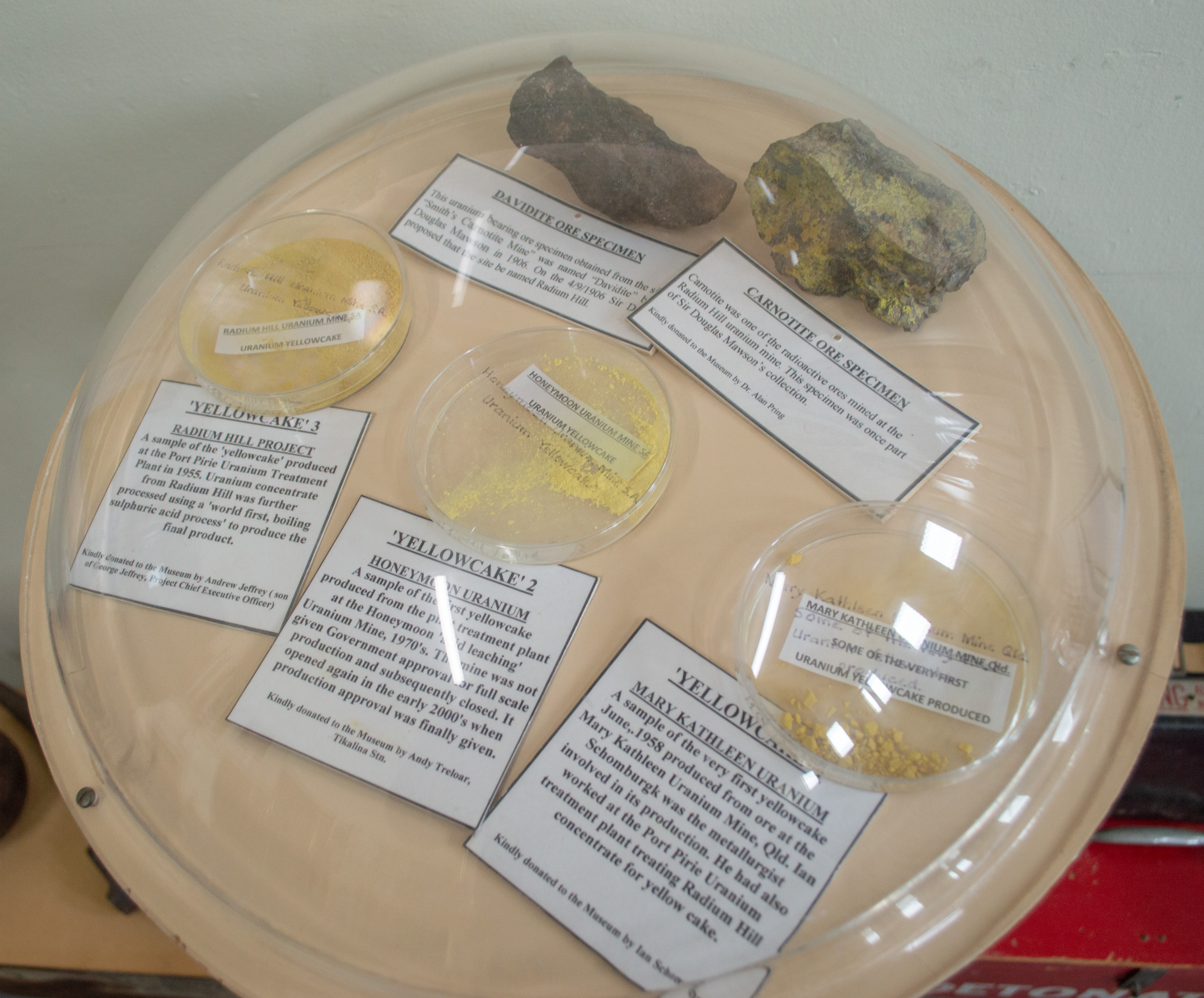
Yellowcake and ore

Yellowcake consists primarily (>99%) of U-238, which has relatively low radioactivity. With a half-life of 4.468 billion years, U-238 emits radiation slowly. At this processing stage, before U-235 concentration, the material's radioactivity matches its natural state when underground, maintaining native isotopic ratios. While generally stable, yellowcake poses inhalation hazards.

== See also ==
- Uranium mining
- Uraninite – an ore primarily composed of uranium dioxide (UO_{2})
- Niger uranium forgeries – fraudulent documents alleging Iraqi yellowcake purchases
- Sequoyah Fuels Corporation – U.S. yellowcake processor
- COMINAK – Nigerien uranium producer
- SOMAIR – Nigerien uranium producer
- Vanadium(V) oxide – whose hydrous precipitates are called "redcake"
