= Lindsay Helmholz =

American physicist

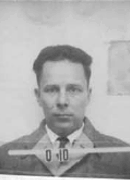
- Los Alamos ID card
- Born: November 11, 1909; Chicago, Illinois
- Died: March 17, 1993 (aged 83)
- Education: Cornell University; Johns Hopkins University
- Scientific career
- Fields: Chemistry
- Workplaces: California Institute of Technology; Dartmouth College; Los Alamos Laboratory; Washington University in St. Louis
- Thesis: Lattice energies of rubidium bromide and sodium chloride and electron affinities of their halogens (1933)
- Doctoral advisor: Joseph E. Mayer

Lindsay Helmholz (November 11, 1909 – March 17, 1993) was an American physicist who participated in the Manhattan Project during World War II that created the atomic bomb. He earned a PhD in chemistry at Johns Hopkins University before studying under Linus Pauling at California Institute of Technology and becoming a professor at Dartmouth College. After World War II, he joined the faculty at Washington University in St. Louis where he continued his work with X-ray diffraction and retired in 1978.

== Chemistry studies ==
Lindsay Helmholz was born in Chicago on November 11, 1909, the son of Henry Helmholz and his wife Isabel née Lindsay. He had two brothers, Henry Frederic and August Carl Helmholz, and a sister, Margaret. He entered Cornell University in 1926, and graduated two years later. He then went to Johns Hopkins University, where he submitted his PhD thesis on "Lattice energies of rubidium bromide and sodium chloride and electron affinities of their halogens" in 1933, writing under the supervision of Joseph Edward Mayer. Helmholz investigated the Born–Haber cycle in order to determine the electron affinity of fluorine.

Helmholz was a National Research Council postdoctoral fellow from 1934 to 1936, and he studied crystallography at the California Institute of Technology, working under Linus Pauling. After his fellowship ended, he became an instructor there. Pauling attempted to secure Helmholz a more permanent position, at Duke University. He wrote to Paul Gross at Duke, describing Helmholz as "one of our best men." Unsuccessful in this attempt, he then wrote to Elden B. Hartshorn at Dartmouth College:

Dr. Helmholz is a pleasant and cultured young man and is married to a pleasant and cultured young woman. His father is head of the pediatrics division of the Mayo Foundation at Rochester.

This approach was ultimately successful, and Helmholz moved to Dartmouth College in 1941 as an assistant professor. He created his own X-ray apparatus in order to continue his research into crystallography.

== World War II and later career ==
During World War II, Helmholz worked on the Manhattan Project at the secret Los Alamos Laboratory in New Mexico. He was part of the committee that oversaw the RaLa Experiments, and worked out the chemical procedures for separating 100 curies (3.7 TBq) of lanthanum-140 from barium chloride. He was also involved with the Water Boiler, an aqueous homogeneous reactor in which the nuclear fuel is dissolved in water. Helmholz conducted experiments with various compounds to find a suitable salt for use in this reactor. His experiments narrowed the choice to uranium sulfate and uranium nitrate, and the former was ultimately chosen because sulfur's neutron capture cross section is less than that of nitrogen.

After the war ended, Joseph W. Kennedy, the wartime head of the Chemistry and Metallurgy Division at Los Alamos, became the head of the chemistry department at Washington University in St. Louis, and he recruited Helmholz, who was awarded a Guggenheim Fellowship in 1945. Helmhoz brought his X-ray diffractometer with his from Dartmouth, and resumed his research into X-ray diffraction and spectroscopy. He became an associate professor in 1948, and a professor in 1957. A 1952 paper with his student Max Wolfsberg on "The spectra and electronic structure of the tetrahedral ions MnO^{−}_{4}, CrO^{−}_{4}, and ClO^{−}_{4}" is today considered to represent "the beginning of a paradigm shift in the way chemists approached the electronic structure of transition metal complexes", and a decade ahead of its time.

Helmholz was acting chair of the department from 1963 to 1964, and again from 1976 to 1978. He retired in 1978, and died on March 17, 1993.
