= Plutonium(IV) sulfate =

Names
- IUPAC name Plutonium(IV) sulfate

Identifiers
3D model (JSmol)	anhydrous: Interactive image; tetrahdyrate: Interactive image
- InChI: anhydrous: InChI=1S/2H2O4S.Pu/c2*1-5(2,3)4;/h2*(H2,1,2,3,4);/q;;+4/p-4 Key: QRGPRHDJXDGLIN-UHFFFAOYSA-J; tetrahdyrate: InChI=1S/2H2O4S.4H2O.Pu/c2*1-5(2,3)4;;;;;/h2*(H2,1,2,3,4);4*1H2;/q;;;;;;+4/p-4 Key: UAJVPPUGRHQMOQ-UHFFFAOYSA-J
- SMILES: anhydrous: O=S(=O)([O-])[O-].O=S(=O)([O-])[O-].[Pu+4]; tetrahdyrate: O=S(=O)([O-])[O-].O=S(=O)([O-])[O-].[Pu+4].O.O.O.O

Properties
Chemical formula	Pu(SO_{4})_{2}
Molar mass	506.18 g/mol
Appearance	Red crystalline solid
Solubility in water	Somewhat soluble

Structure
Crystal structure	Orthorhombic
Space group	Fddd (α-Pu(SO_{4})_{2}·4H_{2}O); Pnma (β-Pu(SO_{4})_{2}·4H_{2}O)
Point group	mmm (α-Pu(SO_{4})_{2}·4H_{2}O)

Related compounds
Other anions	Plutonium(IV) oxide Plutonium(IV) fluoride
Other cations	Uranium(IV) sulfate Uranyl sulfate
- Except where otherwise noted, data are given for materials in their standard state (at 25 °C [77 °F], 100 kPa). Infobox references

Plutonium(IV) sulfate is an inorganic salt consisting of plutonium and sulfate ions, with the chemical formula Pu(SO_{4})_{2}·xH_{2}O. It has been observed as a tetrahydrate, where x=4, as well as an anhydrous form, where x=0. The tetrahydrate has been used as a primary standard for plutonium.

== In aqueous solution ==
Aqueous plutonium(IV) sulfate is produced when plutonium(IV) ions react with bisulfate or sulfate.

Pu^{4+}(aq) + 2 HSO^{−}_{4}(aq) → Pu(SO_{4})_{2}(aq) + 2 H^{+}(aq)
Pu^{4+}(aq) + 2 SO^{2−}_{4}(aq) → Pu(SO_{4})_{2}(aq)

== Reactions ==
At high temperatures, plutonium(IV) sulfate tetrahydrate decomposes. It first releases its water between 85 °C and 535 °C to eventually form anhydrous plutonium(IV) sulfate. Anhydrous plutonium(IV) sulfate decomposes between 605 °C and 810 °C to produce plutonium(IV) oxide. During decomposition of plutonium(IV) sulfate, it releases hazardous sulfur oxides. At normal temperatures, however, plutonium(IV) sulfate tetrahydrate is stable in air, even at high humidity.

== Structure ==
In plutonium(IV) sulfate tetrahydrate, the sulfate and water ligands are monodentate, with bonds between the plutonium atoms and the oxygen atoms in water and sulfate. Each plutonium atom has a coordination number of 8, and a coordination geometry of square antiprismatic. Plutonium(IV) sulfate tetrahydrate crystals have an orthorhombic crystal structure. Hydrogen bonds exist between hydrogen atoms in the water molecules and oxygen atoms in the sulfate ions that are not attached to the plutonium atom.

=== Polymorphs ===
Plutonium(IV) sulfate tetrahydrate has two polymorphs– α-Pu(SO_{4})_{2}·4H_{2}O and β-Pu(SO_{4})_{2}·4H_{2}O. The two forms share the same molecular geometry, but differ in the functional nature of the hydrogen bonds. The α-form transitions into the β-form at ~120°C.

α-Pu(SO_{4})_{2}·4H_{2}O has a unit cell with dimensions a=26.53Å, b=12.00Å, and c=5.69Å, where there are 8 formula units per unit cell.

β-Pu(SO_{4})_{2}·4H_{2}O has a unit cell with dimensions a=14.54Å, b=10.98Å, and c=5.67Å, where there are 4 formula units per unit cell.

== Hazards ==
Plutonium(IV) sulfate is a highly dangerous compound, due to it being radioactive and carcinogenic.
