= Helmholtz (disambiguation) =

Helmholtz most commonly refers to Hermann von Helmholtz (1821-1894), German physician and physicist.

Helmholtz or Helmholz may also refer to:

- Places named after the German physicist:
  - Helmholtz (lunar crater)
  - Helmholtz (Martian crater)
- Helmholtz Association of German Research Centres
- A. Carl Helmholz (1915–2003), an American nuclear physicist
- Anna von Helmholtz (1834–1899), German salonnière, writer and translator
- Lindsay Helmholz (1909–1993), an American chemist
- Helmholtz Watson, a character in Aldous Huxley's Brave New World
- Helmholtz equation, the eigenvalue problem for the Laplacian operator
- Helmholtz free energy, a thermodynamic potential measuring obtainable work from a closed system
- Helmholtz machine, a category of artificial neural networks
