= Uranyl perchlorate =

Names
- Systematic IUPAC name Dioxouranium(II) diperchlorate
- Other names: Uranyl(VI) perchlorate

Identifiers
CAS Number	13093-00-0
3D model (JSmol)	Interactive image
ChemSpider	65793093
PubChem CID	129630977
- InChI: Key: ZTNXXKBKLXTFPH-UHFFFAOYSA-L; InChI=1S/2ClHO4.2O.U/c2*2-1(3,4)5;;;/h2*(H,2,3,4,5);;;/q;;;;+2/p-2
- SMILES: [O-]Cl(=O)(=O)=O.[O-]Cl(=O)(=O)=O.O=[U+2]=O

Properties
Chemical formula	UO_{2}(ClO_{4})_{2}
Molar mass	468.93 g/mol
Appearance	Yellow solid
Density	2.696 g/cm^{3} (heptahydrate)
Melting point	60 °C (140 °F; 333 K) (heptahydrate)
Solubility in water	Soluble

Structure
Coordination geometry	Pentagonal bipyramidal (around U, hydrates)

Hazards
- GHS labelling
Pictograms	(GHS03: Oxidizing) (GHS06: Toxic) (GHS08: Health hazard)
Signal word	Danger
- NIOSH (US health exposure limits)
PEL (Permissible)	0.05 mg/m^{3}

Related compounds
Other anions	Uranyl nitrate Uranyl sulfate
Other cations	Plutonyl perchlorate
- Except where otherwise noted, data are given for materials in their standard state (at 25 °C [77 °F], 100 kPa). Infobox references

Uranyl perchlorate is a radioactive inorganic chemical compound or uranium with the formula UO_{2}(ClO_{4})_{2}·nH_{2}O, where n equals 3, 5, and 7. They are all yellow-colored hygroscopic solids. The most common is the heptahydrate, UO_{2}(ClO_{4})_{2}·7H_{2}O, which has historically been mischaracterized as a hexahydrate. It is used as a source of soluble uranyl ions.

== Preparation and structure ==
Solutions of uranyl perchlorate is produced by the dissolution of uranium(VI) oxide in 72% perchloric acid:

UO_{3} + 2 HClO_{4} → UO_{2}(ClO_{4})_{2} + H_{2}O

Evaporating the solution under vacuum gives the pentahydrate and subsequently the trihydrate, while the heptahydrate forms by the recrystallization of these lower hydrates. The monohydrate and anhydrous form have also been claimed to be formed when the trihydrate is heated in vacuum.

All hydrates of uranyl perchlorate contain 7-coordinate uranium centers.

Crystallographic data for the 3 hydrates of uranyl perchlorate
Hydrate	Trihydrate	Pentahydrate	Heptahydrate
Structural formula	UO_{2}(ClO_{4})_{2}(H_{2}O)_{3}	[UO_{2}(H_{2}O)_{5}](ClO_{4})_{2}	[UO_{2}(H_{2}O)_{5}](ClO_{4})_{2}·2H_{2}O
Crystal Structure	Monoclinic	Monoclinic	Orthorhombic
Space group	P2_{1}/c	P2_{1}/n	Pbcn
Lattice constant a (Å)	5.45	5.29	9.21
Lattice constant b (Å)	18.11	16.45	10.68
Lattice constant c (Å)	10.32	10.68	14.46
β	90.02°	99.85°	
Z	4	4	4
Calculated density (g/cm^{3})	3.367	2.871	2.696
