= Donald Mastick =

American chemist (1920–2007)

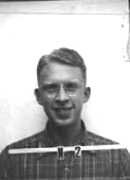
- Los Alamos ID
- Born: September 1, 1920; St. Helena, California, US
- Died: September 8, 2007 (aged 87); Santa Barbara, California, US
- Education: University of California, Berkeley (BS 1942, PhD 1950)
- Awards: Bronze Star Medal
- Scientific career
- Fields: Chemistry
- Workplaces: Los Alamos Laboratory; Naval Radiological Defense Laboratory; Atomic Energy Commission
- Thesis: A study of gaseous oxides at high temperatures (1950)

Donald Francis Mastick (September 1, 1920 – September 8, 2007) was an American chemist who worked at the Manhattan Project's Los Alamos Laboratory. As part of Project Alberta, he was part of the planning and preparation for the atomic bombing of Hiroshima and Nagasaki, for which he was awarded the Bronze Star Medal. Mastick is known for a lab incident in 1944 when he accidentally ingested a small amount of plutonium, traces of which remained detectable in his body decades later. After the incident, he worked for the Naval Radiological Defense Laboratory and the Atomic Energy Commission.

== Early life ==
Donald Francis Mastick was born in St. Helena, California, the son of Spencer Mastick and his wife Frankie née Hite. He grew up in the Napa Valley. He entered the University of California, Berkeley, where he studied chemistry, graduating with his Bachelor of Science degree in 1942. He was a member of the Phi Beta Kappa and Sigma Xi honor societies.

== Manhattan Project ==
By the time Mastick graduated, the United States had entered World War II. Mastick was studying radioactive carbon. He told Professor Wendell Latimer that he could not stand by while there was a war on, and that he was leaving. Latimer suggested that he instead join a secret project, which would lead to a commission in the United States Navy. He introduced him to Robert Oppenheimer, who recruited him for the Manhattan Project. Initially, Mastick's job was to draw up lists of equipment required by the chemistry laboratories at the Los Alamos Laboratory, which were then under construction.

Mastick moved to Los Alamos early in 1943, where he worked in the Chemistry Division and studied the mysterious chemical properties of plutonium, a synthetic element then available only in microscopic quantities. Although young, he was a member of the group that planned the laboratory's scientific program, along with Robert Wilson, Robert Serber, John Williams and Edwin McMillan.

On August 1, 1944, Mastick and his laboratory partner, Arthur Wahl, were working with a vial containing 10 milligrams of plutonium chloride dissolved in an acid solution when the vial exploded. Gases had built up in the vial overnight, most likely through the dissociation of water molecules due to alpha radiation from the plutonium. Mastick tasted some of the acid in his mouth, so he knew that he had ingested some plutonium. Mastick replaced the vial in its wooden container, and went to see Dr. Louis Hempelmann, the director of the Health Group at Los Alamos. Hempelmann phoned Colonel Stafford L. Warren, the Manhattan Project's medical director, at the Clinton Engineer Works in Oak Ridge, Tennessee.

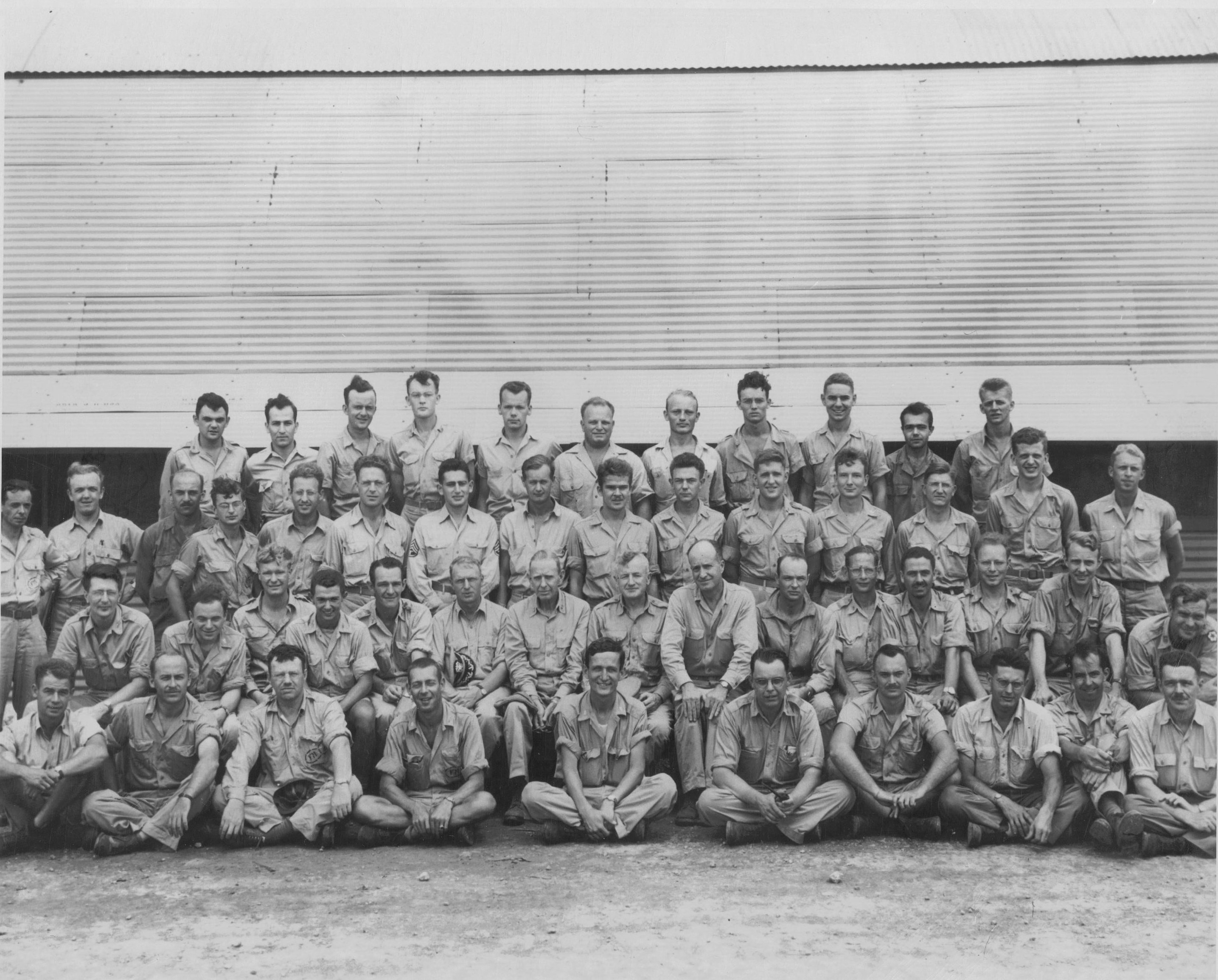
Group photograph of Project Alberta. Mastick is in the third row from the front, on the far right.

Mastick's face was scrubbed, but his skin remained contaminated with a microgram of plutonium. Hempelmann gave him a mouthwash of trisodium citrate, which would combine with the plutonium to form a soluble liquid, and sodium bicarbonate, which would make it solid again. This removed most of the plutonium. Nonetheless, for days afterwards his breath could make the needle on an ionization chamber go off the scale, even from 6 feet (1.8 m) away. Hempelmann used a stomach pump to retrieve plutonium that had been swallowed, which recovered about 60 nanograms of plutonium. Urine assays indicated that less than 1 microgram remained in his body. Some was still detectable 30 years later.

Unable to work in the Chemistry Division any more because of the accident, Mastick suggested to Oppenheimer that he become an assistant to Commander Frederick Ashworth. Mastick initially served as Ashworth's administrative assistant, but soon became involved in the drop-testing of pumpkin bombs in the Salton Sea, Silverplate modifications to the Boeing B-29 Superfortress to carry nuclear weapons, and modifications to the casing and tail configurations of the bombs themselves. He also investigated the inadvertent dropping of Little Boy due to a faulty electrical circuit.

Mastick was commissioned as an ensign in the United States Navy Reserve in June 1945. Five days later he headed to Tinian as part of Project Alberta. For his part in the atomic bombing of Hiroshima and Nagasaki, he was awarded the Bronze Star Medal. After the war ended he participated in the Operation Crossroads nuclear tests at Bikini Atoll. He left the Navy with the rank of lieutenant (junior grade).

== Post-war ==
Mastick returned to the University of California, where he earned his PhD in 1950, writing his thesis on A study of gaseous oxides at high temperatures. He became the head of the Radiochemical Research section at the Naval Radiological Defense Laboratory San Francisco. In 1951 he joined the Atomic Energy Commission, as a scientific advisor and the manager of the Division of Military Applications. He then became vice president and Director of Precision Technology at General Precision Equipment. In 1957, he joined Stauffer Chemical as its director of research. He married Irene Pietrusiak, and they had a daughter, Patricia. In 1971, they started an interior landscape company, Foliage Plant Systems. Initially located in Saddle River, New Jersey, the business subsequently expanded into seven states, and earned accolades including one presented by Nancy Reagan at the White House in Washington, D.C.

Mastick died in Santa Barbara, California, on September 8, 2007.
