= Louis Hempelmann =

American physician

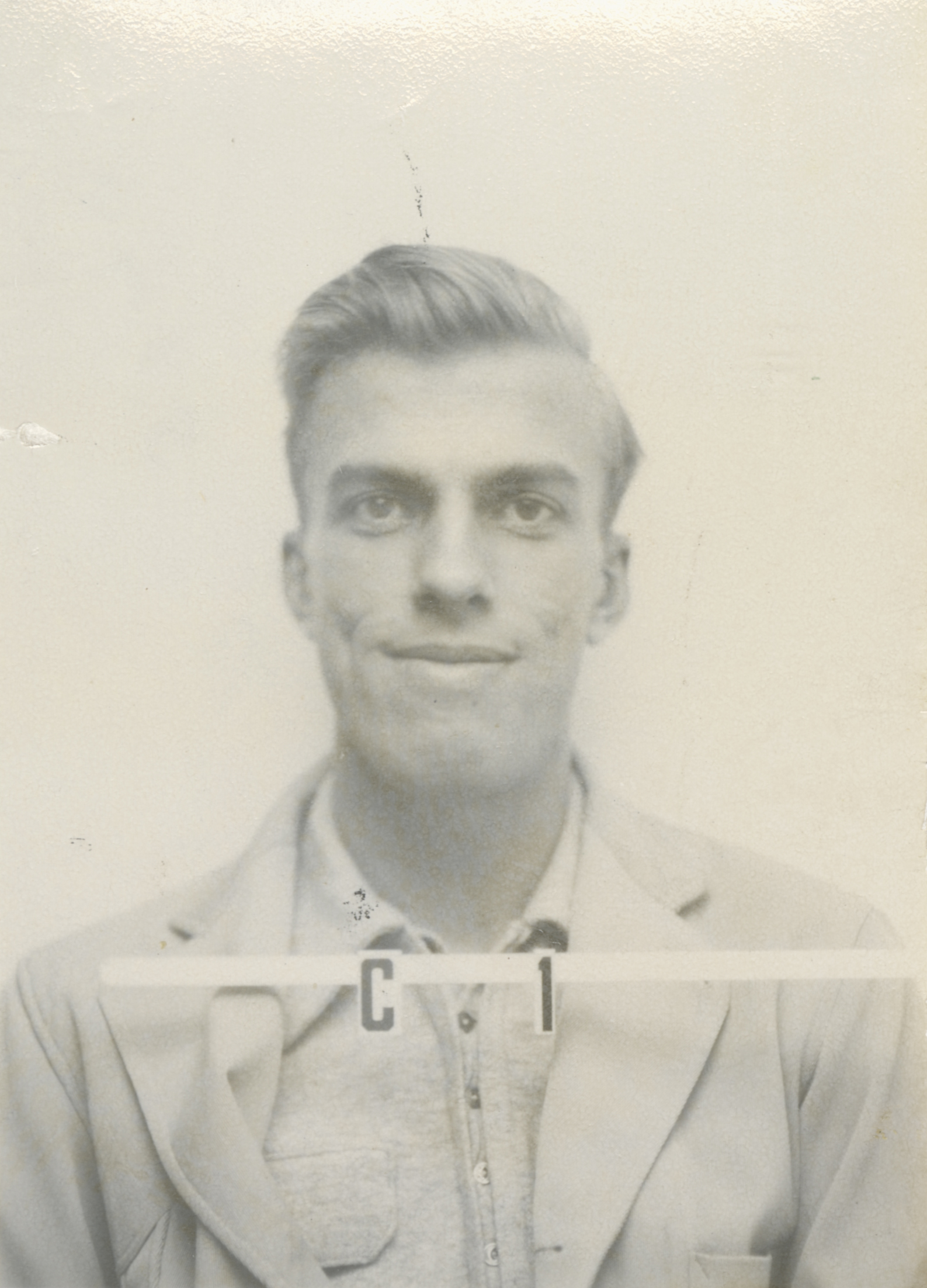
- Los Alamos badge
- Born: March 5, 1914; St. Louis, Missouri, US
- Died: June 21, 1993 (aged 79); Rochester, New York, US
- Resting place: Bellefontaine Cemetery, St. Louis, Missouri
- Occupation: Physician
- Known for: Manhattan Project

Louis Henry Hempelmann Jr, (March 5, 1914 – June 21, 1993) was an American physician who was the director of the Health Group at the Manhattan Project's Los Alamos Laboratory during World War II. After the war he was involved in research into radiology. A paper he published in the New England Journal of Medicine in 1949 warned of the dangers of using fluoroscopes to measure the size of children's feet.

== Early life ==
Louis Henry Hempelmann Jr. was born in St. Louis, Missouri, on March 5, 1914, the son of Louis Henry Hempelmann Sr. Both his father and grandfather were physicians. He earned both his undergraduate and medical degrees from Washington University in St. Louis, from which he graduated in 1938. He did his internship in pathology at Barnes Hospital in St. Louis, and then his residency at Peter Bent Brigham Hospital in Boston.

In 1941, Sherwood Moore, the director of Mallinckrodt Institute of Radiology in St. Louis, and a friend of his father, offered Hempelmann a position there. The Mallinckrodt Institute was building a cyclotron in order to treat cancer patients with neutrons. Hempelmann received a Commonwealth Fellowship to study at the University of California, Berkeley, where there was a cyclotron at the Radiation laboratory run by Ernest Lawrence, its inventor. For the next four months Hempelmann worked with Robert Stone, who was treating patients with neutrons, and Lawrence's brother, John H. Lawrence, who ran the radioactive phosphorus clinic there. While in Berkeley he met Robert Oppenheimer.

When he returned to the Mallinckrodt Institute, the cyclotron had been completed, but was being used to manufacture plutonium, so instead Hempelmann established a radioactive phosphorus clinic along the lines of Lawrence's one in Berkeley.

== Manhattan Project ==
In early 1943, Hempelmann was summoned to a meeting in Chicago, where Oppenheimer recruited him to work on the Manhattan Project. Oppenheimer asked Hempelmann if he could think of someone to run the Post Hospital, so Hempelmann approached James F. Nolan, a Washington University in St. Louis classmate who was studying at the Memorial Hospital in New York. Nolan was trained in obstetrics and gynecology, which turned out to be useful. Oppenheimer took the two doctors to see the Los Alamos Laboratory, which was then under construction, in March 1943, and Hempelmann moved there in April 1943, Nolan was subsequently commissioned as a captain in the Medical Corps, but Hempelmann remained a civilian. As the head of the A-6 Health Group, he was responsible for occupational health and safety. The Health Group set safe levels of exposure to hazardous chemicals and radioactive substances, and disseminated information about them. It also kept records of hazards to which individuals had been exposed; Records of ordinary injuries were kept by the Post Hospital.

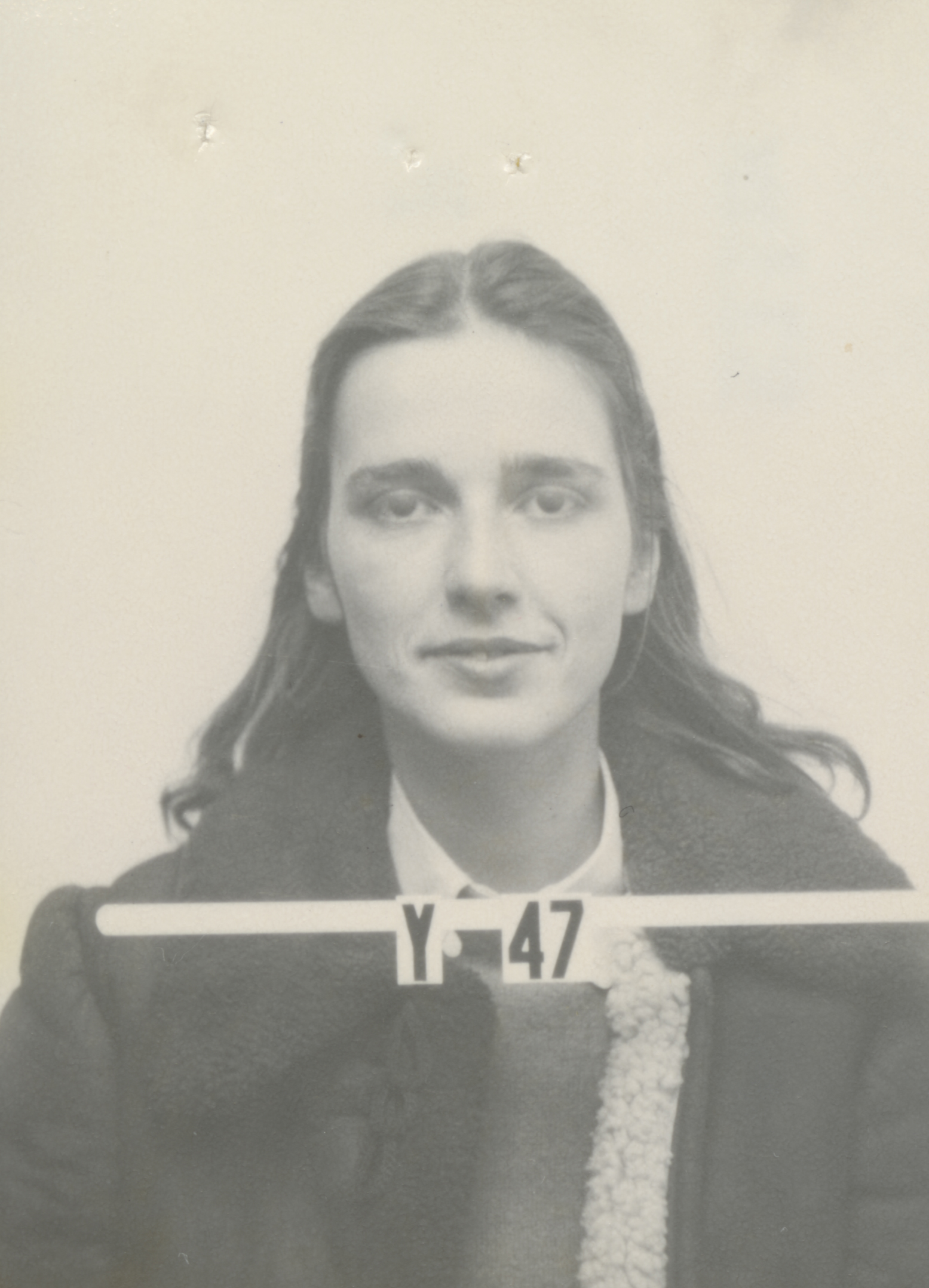
Elinor Hempelmann's Los Alamos badge

On June 5, 1943, Hempelmann married Elinor Pulitzer. She was a granddaughter of the newspaper publisher Joseph Pulitzer, and a graduate of Mary Institute in St. Louis. She had also attended a secretarial school. They never had children. Wives were encouraged to work at Los Alamos, so she became his secretary. Hempelmann and Elinor became close friends of the Oppenheimers, and were godparents to the Oppenheimers' children. Kitty Oppenheimer worked for Hempelmann as a laboratory technician, conducting blood tests to assess the danger of radiation.

The first year at Los Alamos was uneventful for the Health Group, which researched the extent of variation in blood counts. The range of variation was found to be higher than expected. This might have resulted in misdiagnosis of overexposure. Serious health issues began to occur in 1944, with the arrival of the first samples of plutonium. Plutonium is similar to radium in that it is deposited in the bones, where its alpha radiation may cause sarcoma, but while radium is chemically similar to calcium and becomes part of living bone, plutonium is deposited on the surface membranes. It can also damage the kidneys. Hempelmann visited a Boston luminous paint company to see how it was handled in industry. When he returned he established three special committees in the Chemistry and Metallurgy Division: one to procure instrumentation to measure radioactive contamination; one to design equipment for handling plutonium; and one to develop standards and procedures for its safe handling.

An accident occurred on August 1, 1944, when chemist Donald Mastick ingested some plutonium when a vial he was handling exploded. Mastick's face was scrubbed, but his skin remained contaminated with a microgram of plutonium. Hempelmann gave him a mouthwash of trisodium citrate, which would combine with the plutonium to form a soluble liquid, and sodium bicarbonate, which would make it solid again. This removed most of the plutonium. Nonetheless, for days afterwards his breath could make the needle on an ionization chamber go off the scale, even from across the room. Hempelmann used a stomach pump to retrieve plutonium that had been swallowed, recovering about 60 nanograms. Urine assays indicated that less than 1 microgram remained in his body. Some was still detectable thirty years later.

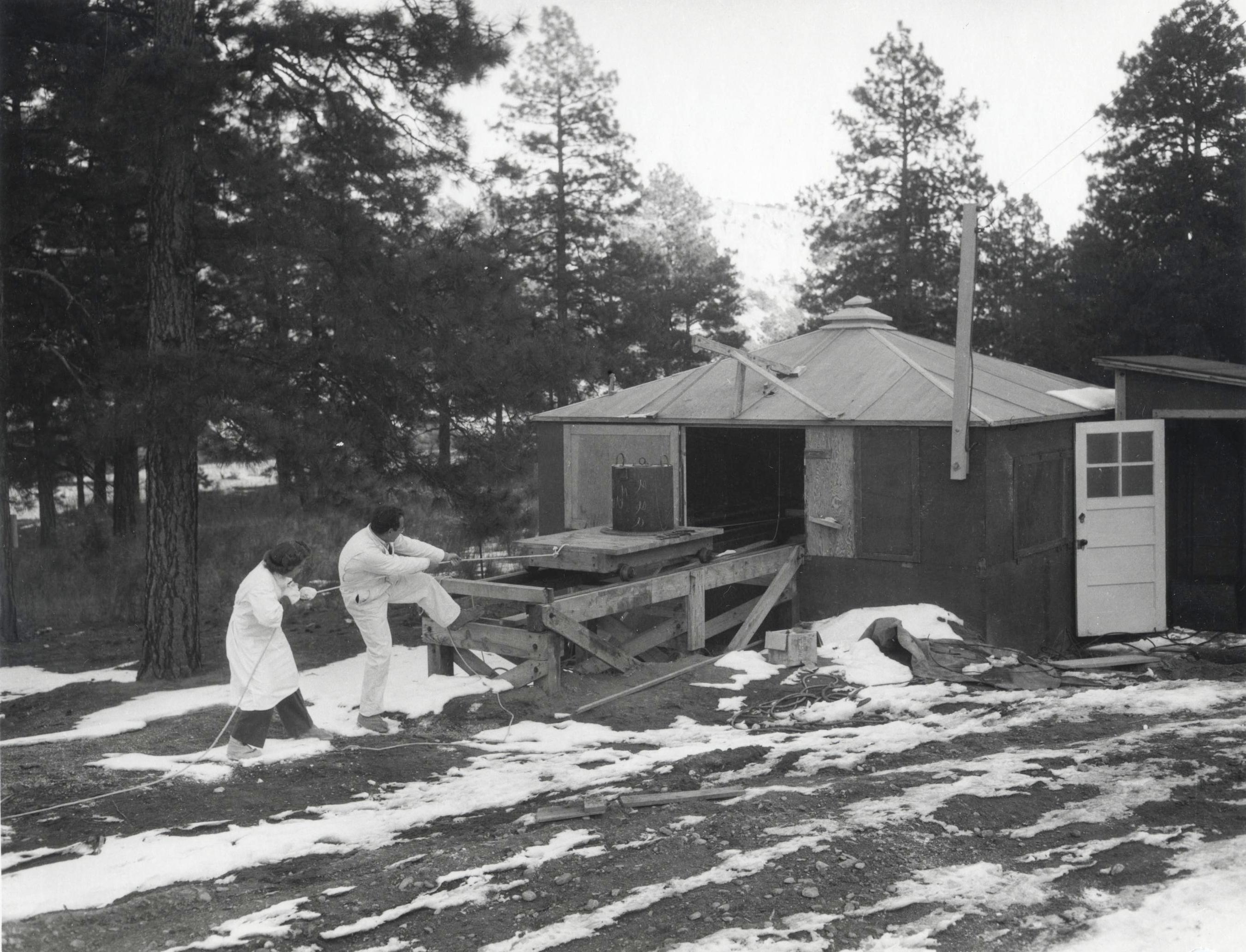
Remote handling of a kilocurie source of radiolanthanum for RaLa experiments

The accident brought to a head dissatisfaction in both the Health Group and the Chemistry and Metallurgy Division with the progress of research into biological aspects of plutonium. A committee was established consisting of Hempelmann, Joseph W. Kennedy and Arthur Wahl to develop tests for overexposure to plutonium. At the time the main means of testing was by taking swabs from the nostrils. A better assay test was devised in January 1945 that could detect plutonium in urine in quantities as low as 10^{−10} micrograms per liter. The test came into general use in April 1945, just in time for the arrival of larger quantities of plutonium produced at the Hanford Site. Because it was time-consuming, reliance was still placed on nose tests, those that registered as most exposed being singled out for urine tests. These indicated that four persons had more than the microgram of plutonium considered safe.

Plutonium was not the only radioactive hazard. There was also polonium, although it never became a serious problem. In 1944 three more dangers appeared: the water boiler aqueous homogeneous reactor, which occasionally sprang a leak and emitted radioactive gases; the RaLa Experiments, which used quantities of highly radioactive materials; and critical assembly experiments, which were particularly dangerous because they seemed so safe that they engendered a sense of complacency in the experimenters. These experiments resulted in two fatal accidents, causing the deaths of physicists Harry Daghlian in August 1945 and Louis Slotin in May 1946. Hempelmann later published a detailed account of these accidents in the Annals of Internal Medicine. Hempelmann and his collaborator George L. Voelz continued to study the 27 survivors of these accidents. None showed any signs of radiogenic disease until 1990, when one developed osteosarcoma.

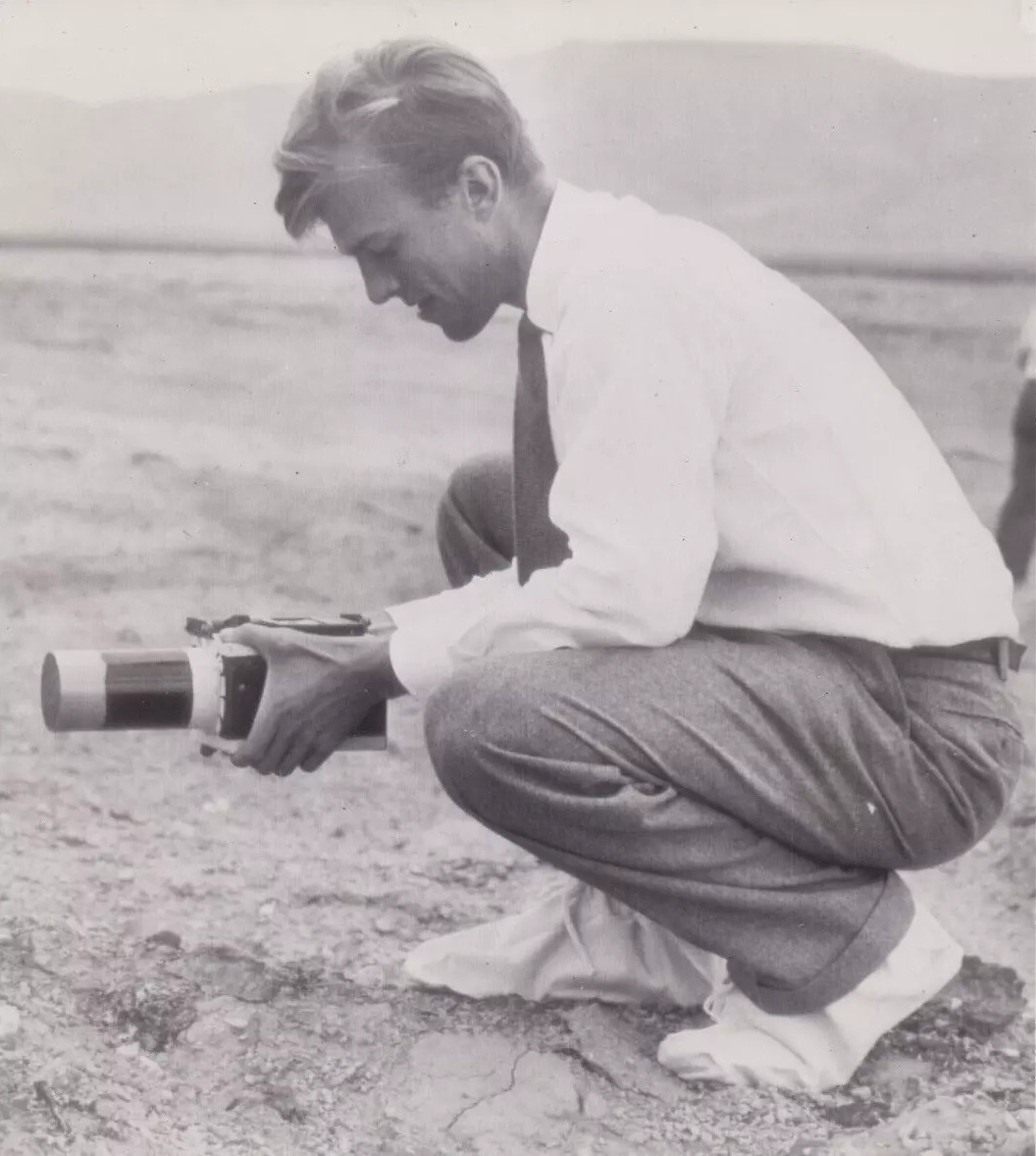
Hempelmann using a Roentgenometer to measure radiation levels at an atomic bomb site in New Mexico, 1945

Hempelmann was involved in the planning of the Trinity nuclear test in July 1945, and handled the safety planning for the 100-ton test that preceded it. He delegated responsibility for the main test to Nolan, but had to take over when Nolan was called away to help transport components of the Little Boy bomb to Tinian. In 1946 Hempelmann assisted with the Operation Crossroads nuclear tests in the Pacific.

== Post-war ==
Hempelmann left Los Alamos in 1948, and went to Harvard University as a medical researcher, although he remained a consultant to the Atomic Energy Commission. In 1949 he published an article in the New England Journal of Medicine warning of the dangers of using fluoroscopes to measure the size of children's feet, a common practice at the time. The fluoroscopes soon disappeared from shoe stores. He joined the medical faculty of the University of Rochester in 1950 as an associate professor of Experimental radiology. He came into conflict with the chairman of the Radiology Department over the use of fluoroscopy on infants. At the time, when X-rays were conducted on infants, high-dose fluoroscopy was carried out routinely, as this provided better information on squirming babies. Pediatricians began writing "film only, no fluoroscopy" on X-ray requests. The procedures were changed after it was revealed that a 3-pound (1.4 kg) infant had received seven fluoroscopies and 75 röntgens to the thymus. Hempelmann then embarked on a series of studies of children who had been given radiation therapy for thymus enlargement. At the time such long-term studies were very unusual.

In 1952, Hempelmann published a collaborative review of thirty people who had been treated with radium as part of medical treatment, or had ingested radium as radium dial painters. The study found that X-ray films detected radium in their bodies, and that they had a higher than average number of cases of cancer. He was the chairman of the Department of Radiology from 1960 to 1971. He initiated innovative studies, such as an attempt to determine if leukaemia or lymphoma could be contracted through blood transfusions. The study did not find any of the 105 recipients had developed the diseases. In 1967 a student at Jefferson Medical College who wanted to study the effects of radiation on the human body was referred to Hempelmann, who suggested a study of women who had received X-ray treatment for acute postpartum mastitis between ten and twenty-five years before. The study examined 606 women, of whom 13 had developed breast cancer compared with the expected number of 6. The student, Fred A. Mettler, subsequently became the chairman of the Department of Radiology at the University of New Mexico, and an authority on the effects of radiation.

The Hempelmanns divided their time between Rochester and a property they purchased in Pojoaque, New Mexico. They remained close to the Oppenheimers, visiting them at their home in Princeton, New Jersey, and their holiday house in Saint John in the United States Virgin Islands. The Oppenheimer children, Peter and Toni, stayed with the Hempelmanns during the Oppenheimer security hearing. Hempelmann died on June 21, 1993, at Strong Memorial Hospital in Rochester, New York, from complications following a stroke. His remains were cremated and interred in Bellefontaine Cemetery in St. Louis.
