= Raemer Schreiber =

American nuclear physicist (1910–1998)

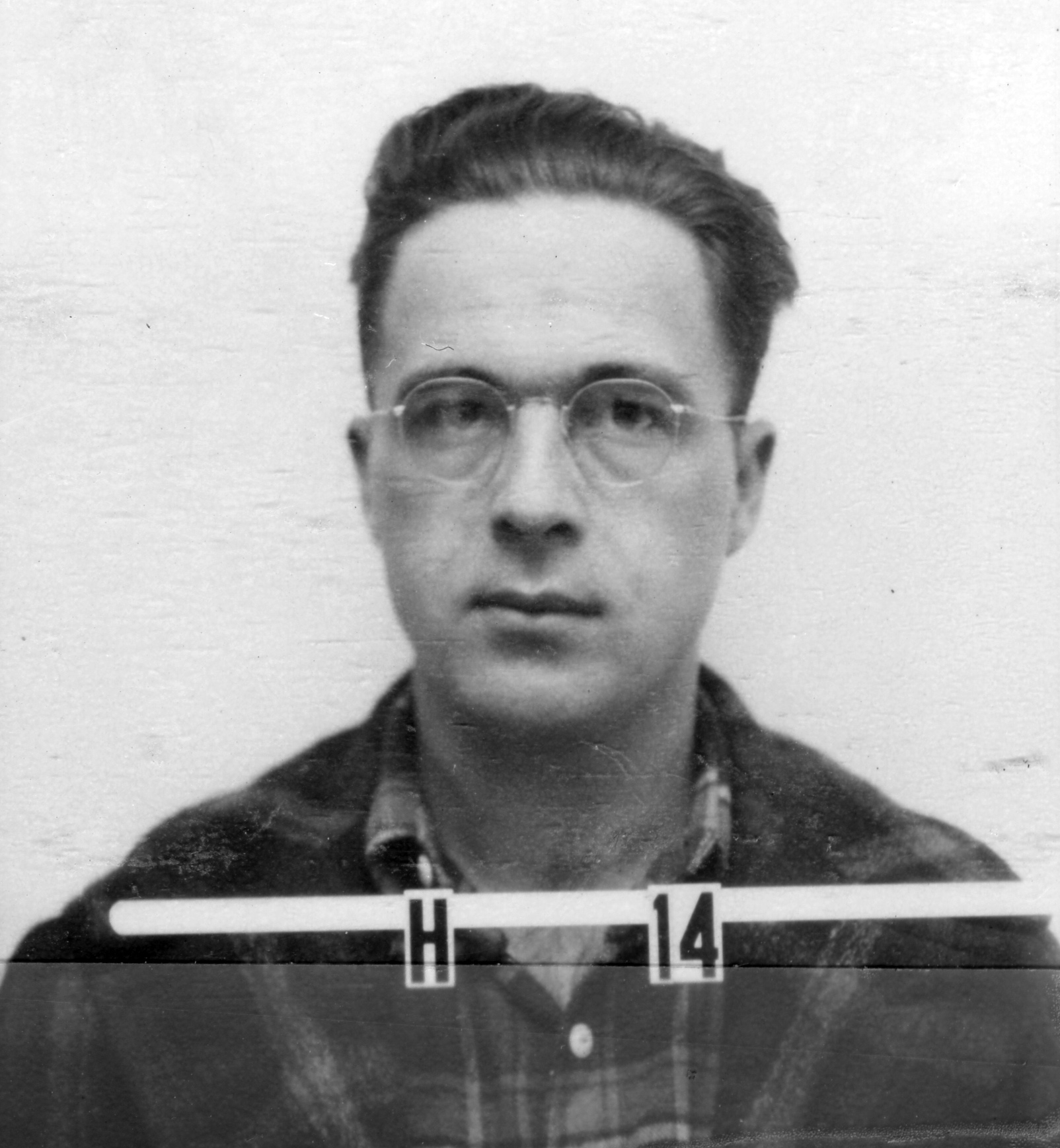
- Schreiber's Los Alamos laboratory ID
- Born: Raemer Edgar Schreiber; November 11, 1910; McMinnville, Oregon, United States
- Died: December 24, 1998 (aged 88); Los Alamos, New Mexico
- Education: Linfield College (B.A., 1931); University of Oregon (M.A., 1932); Purdue University (Ph.D., 1941)
- Known for: Nuclear rocket propulsion
- Scientific career
- Fields: Physics
- Workplaces: Los Alamos National Laboratory

Raemer Edgar Schreiber (November 11, 1910 – December 24, 1998) was an American physicist from McMinnville, Oregon who served Los Alamos National Laboratory during World War II, participating in the development of the atomic bomb. He saw the first one detonated in the Trinity nuclear test in July 1945, and prepared the Fat Man bomb that was used in the bombing of Nagasaki. After the war, he served at Los Alamos as a group leader, and was involved in the design of the hydrogen bomb. In 1955, he became the head of its Nuclear Rocket Propulsion (N) Division, which developed the first nuclear-powered rockets. He served as deputy director of the laboratory from 1972 until his retirement in 1974.

== Early life ==
Raemer Edgar Schreiber was born in McMinnville, Oregon on November 11, 1910, the son of Bertha (née Raemer) and Michael Schreiber. He was educated at Masonville Grade School and McMinnville High School. In 1927 he entered Linfield College in McMinnville, where he majored in physics and mathematics, and received his Bachelor of Arts degree in 1931. He then earned his Master of Arts degree from the University of Oregon in 1932.

Schreiber was a graduate assistant at Oregon State College from 1932 to 1935, when he became an instructor at Purdue University. He was awarded his Ph.D. from Purdue in 1941, writing a thesis on an "Investigation of Nuclear Reactions and Scattering Produced by Neutrons". For his thesis, he constructed a neutron generator, and originally intended to discuss the possibilities of studying neutron diffraction in crystals, but this really only became possible with the development of nuclear reactors that produced large quantities of high energy neutrons. After the discovery of nuclear fission in 1939, he became interested in the phenomenon, and re-oriented his thesis to the study of neutrons emitted by fission.

== Manhattan Project ==
From 1942 to 1943, Schreiber was a researcher with the Purdue Research Foundation. He participated in early work for the Manhattan Project there using the university's cyclotron. In 1943, he joined the Los Alamos Laboratory, and moved to Los Alamos, New Mexico with his wife and 16-month-old daughter. At Los Alamos, he worked on the Water Boiler, an aqueous homogeneous reactor. The Water Boiler group was headed by Donald W. Kerst from the University of Illinois, and consisted mainly of people from Purdue who had been working on calculations for Edward Teller's thermonuclear "Super" bomb. The group designed and built the Water Boiler, which commenced operation in May 1944. It was intended as a laboratory instrument to test critical mass calculations and the effect of various tamper materials. It was the first reactor to use enriched uranium as a fuel, and the first to use liquid fuel in the form of soluble uranium sulfate dissolved in water.

Schreiber worked on improved reactor designs until April 1945, when he was transferred to Robert Bacher's Gadget (G) Division as a member of the pit assembly team for the Trinity nuclear test. He observed the explosion from the Base Camp on July 16. Nine days later, Lieutenant Colonel Peer de Silva, the official courier, and Schreiber collected another plutonium pit, which Schreiber carried in a magnesium case. They took it to Kirtland Army Air Field, where they boarded a C-54 transport plane on July 26. Two days later, they arrived on the Pacific island of Tinian, where Schreiber helped assemble the Fat Man bomb that was used in the bombing of Nagasaki on August 9. Comparing it with the firebombing of Tokyo by B-29 bombers that killed 100,000 people in one night in March 1945, Schreiber noted that:

Just the fact you could do the same thing with one airplane and one bomb proved the efficiency, but it didn’t change the effect very much. But the firebombing, the saturation bombing of the B-29s, was not bringing Japan to its knees, and the shock effect of one airplane being able to wipe out a city, I think, is what finally convinced the Japanese military they had to give up.

== Later career ==
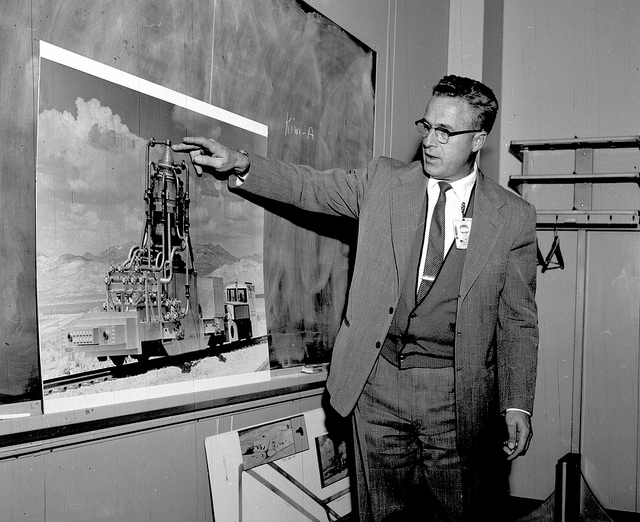
Schreiber with a Project Rover poster in 1959

After the war, Schreiber remained at Los Alamos, where he became a group leader in the Weapon (W) Division. His first assignment was to ready bombs for the Operation Crossroads nuclear tests at Bikini Atoll in the Pacific. During the preparations, he witnessed the accident in which Louis Slotin was exposed to a fatal dose of neutron radiation when a screwdriver Slotin was using during a criticality experiment with one of the plutonium pits for Operation Crossroads slipped and the core went critical. Slotin would die from radiation poisoning nine days later but his quick reaction saved the lives of Schreiber and the others in the room. Schreiber became an exponent of remote handling of dangerous substances, and designed remote-control machines to perform such experiments with all personnel at a quarter-mile distance.

He went on to lead the pit teams on Bikini Atoll in June and July 1946.

Schreiber became the associate leader of W Division in 1947, and then the head of the division in 1951. During this time, W Division worked on the development of the hydrogen bomb. He was once again in charge of the pit crew for the Ivy Mike nuclear test on Enewetak Atoll in the Pacific, the first test of a thermonuclear device. Even the veteran Schreiber was impressed by the 10-megaton-of-TNT (42 PJ) explosion. "It really filled up the sky," he recalled, "It was awesome. It just went on and on."

In 1955, Schreiber became the head of the Nuclear Rocket Propulsion (N) Division, which was responsible for Project Rover and NERVA. N Division developed nuclear rocket engines required for deep space exploration. He oversaw the first successful test of a nuclear rocket engine in 1959, In this capacity, he greeted President John F. Kennedy during the president's visit to Los Alamos in 1962. That year, he became Technical Associate Director, with responsibility for the entire nuclear rocket propulsion program. He became deputy director of Los Alamos in 1972, and served as a member of the United States Air Force Scientific Advisory Board and NASA's Advisory Committee on Nuclear Systems.

== Retirement ==
Schreiber retired in 1974, but remained as a consultant until 1995. He served as a member of the Laboratory's History Advisory Council in the late 1980s, and assisted in the publication of Critical Assembly: A Technical History of Los Alamos during the Oppenheimer Years, 1943-1945 (1993). He also helped the Human Studies Project Team by reviewing its history of medical studies at the Laboratory.

== Personal life and death ==
Schreiber married Marguerite Elizabeth Doak, a Linfield College French major in 1933. They had two daughters, Paula and Sara. Schreiber and Marguerite bought a property at Pajarito Village in the Española Valley in the late 1940s, where they built an adobe home on the weekends. They lived there from 1955 until 1972, when they returned to Los Alamos. He died at his home there on December 24, 1998. He was survived by his wife Marguerite, daughters Paula and Sara, and his sister Anna. His remains, and later those of Marguerite, were interred at Guaje Pines Cemetery. The Laboratory's Advanced Nuclear Technology Group (NIS-6) named its conference room the Raemer E. Schreiber Room in his honor.
