= Kitty Oppenheimer =

American biologist (1910–1972)

Katherine Oppenheimer
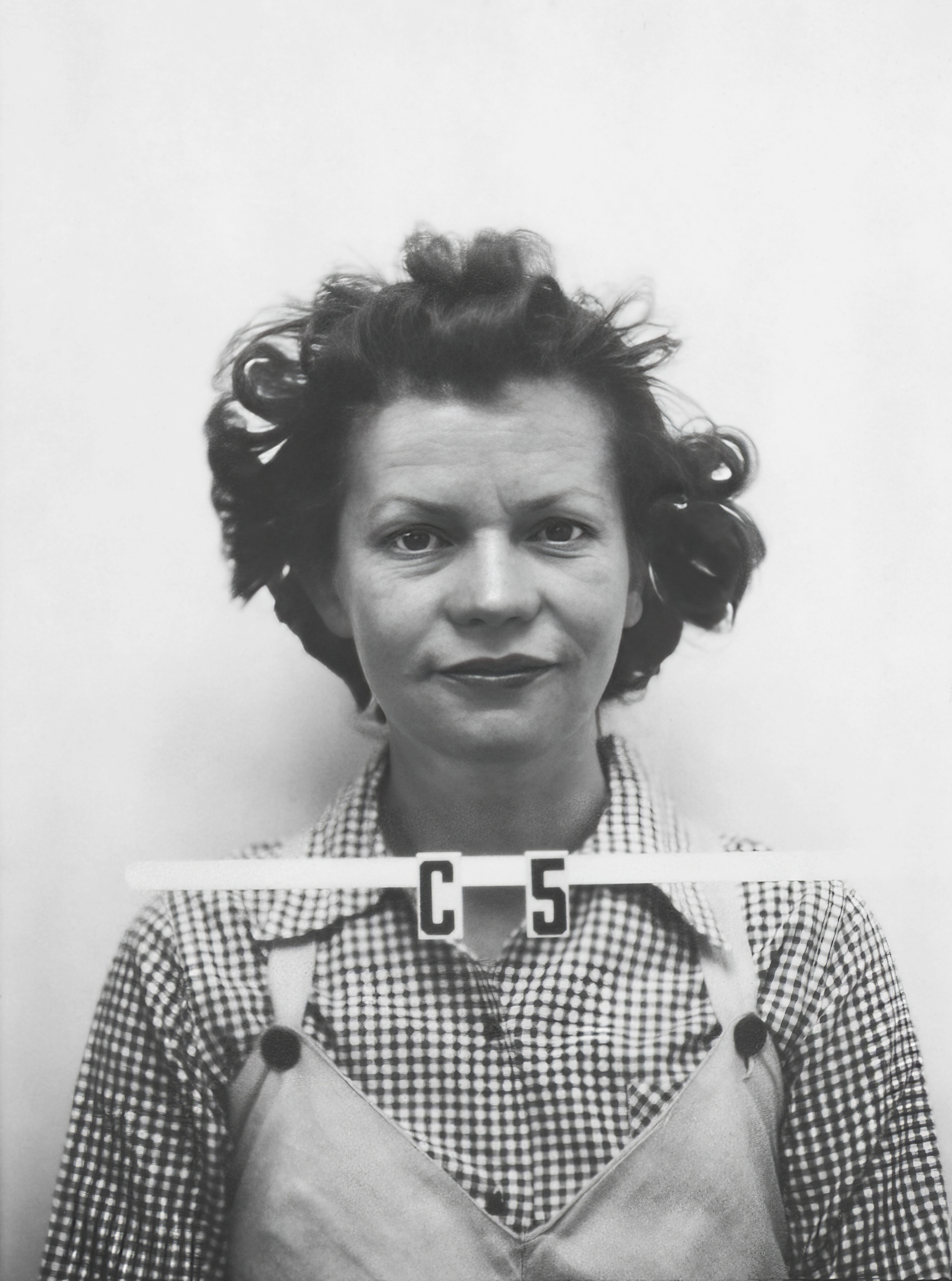
- Wartime Los Alamos identification badge photo, c. 1944
- Born: Katherine Vissering Puening; August 8, 1910; Recklinghausen, Germany
- Died: October 27, 1972 (aged 62); Panama City, Panama
- Other names: Katherine Ramseyer; Katherine Dallet; Katherine Harrison
- Education: University of Pittsburgh; University of Pennsylvania (BS); University of Wisconsin
- Political party: Communist (until 1930s)
- Spouses: Frank Ramseyer (m. 1932; ann. 1933) Joe Dallet (m. 1934; died 1937) Richard Stewart Harrison (m. 1938; div. 1940) J. Robert Oppenheimer (m. 1940; died 1967)
- Children: Peter Oppenheimer (son) & Katherine "Toni" Oppenheimer (daughter)

Katherine Vissering "Kitty" Oppenheimer (née Puening; August 8, 1910 – October 27, 1972) was an American biologist, botanist, and a member of the Communist Party of America until leaving in the 1930s. Her husbands were Frank Ramseyer, Joe Dallet, Richard Stewart Harrison, and physicist J. Robert Oppenheimer, the director of the Manhattan Project's Los Alamos Laboratory during World War II. Kitty has been portrayed in several films about the Manhattan Project, including Oppenheimer (2023) by Emily Blunt.

== Early life ==
Katherine "Kitty" Vissering Puening was born in Recklinghausen, Westphalia, Prussia, Germany, on August 8, 1910, the only child of Franz Puening and Käthe Vissering. Although she claimed that her father was a prince and that her mother was related to Queen Victoria, Kitty would say that her father was the prince of a small state called Westphalia in Germany. Her mother was, in fact, a cousin of Wilhelm Keitel, who later became a field marshal in the German Army during World War II - he was hanged in 1946.

Puening arrived in the United States on May 14, 1913, aboard the SS Kaiser Wilhelm der Grosse when she was two years old. Her father, a metallurgical engineer, had invented a new kind of blast furnace, and had gained employment with a steel company in Pittsburgh, and the family settled in the suburb of Aspinwall, Pennsylvania. Although her first language was German, she soon became fluent in English, speaking both languages without accent. Her parents regularly took her with them on summer visits to Germany.

After graduating from Aspinwall High School in June 1928, Puening enrolled at the University of Pittsburgh. She lived at home and attended freshman classes in mathematics, biology and chemistry. Her father now worked for Koppers, and held patents for the design of blast furnaces. Puening convinced her parents that it would be a good idea for her to study in Germany, and she sailed for Europe in March 1930. It is doubtful that she took any classes, but she did meet Frank Ramseyer, an American studying music in Paris under Nadia Boulanger, before sailing for home on May 19.

Puening completed the first year of her degree, and married Ramseyer before a Justice of the Peace in Pittsburgh on December 24, 1932. The couple moved to an apartment near Harvard University, where Ramseyer hoped to pursue a master's degree in music. She re-enrolled at the University of Pittsburgh in January 1933, and returned to her parents' home in Aspinwall. In June 1933, she sailed to Europe again with her husband. After returning, she enrolled at the University of Wisconsin, although there is no record of her completing any courses there. Puening obtained an annulment of her marriage from the Superior Court of Wisconsin on December 20, 1933. She later told friends that she had discovered evidence that Ramseyer was a homosexual and a drug addict. Puening also had an abortion.

== Communism ==
At a New Year's Eve party later that year, Puening met Joseph Dallet Jr. After the 1927 executions of Sacco and Vanzetti, he joined the Communist Party of America in 1929. He had been involved in the International Unemployment Day protest in Chicago on March 6, 1930, that was brutally repressed by the authorities, and worked as a union organizer with the steel workers in Youngstown, Ohio. At one point Dallet unsuccessfully ran for mayor of Youngstown on the Communist Party ticket.

Puening's parents had moved to Claygate, southwest of London, where her father represented a Chicago-based firm. On returning to the United States on August 3, 1934, after visiting family in Europe, she moved in with Dallet, becoming his common-law wife. They shared a room in a dilapidated boarding house that cost $5 per month. Gus Hall and John Gates had a room down the hall. They lived on the dole, $12.50 per month each. As the wife of a party member, Puening was allowed to join the Communist Party, but only after proving her loyalty by distributing copies of the Daily Worker on the streets. Her party dues were 10c a week.

They separated in June 1936, and Puening went to live with her parents in Claygate, where she worked as a German-to-English translator. Months went by without any word from Dallet, until Puening discovered that her mother had been hiding his letters to her. Her friend Anne Wilson recalled, "Her mother was a real dragon, a very repressive woman. She disappeared one day over the side of a transatlantic ship, and nobody missed her. That says it all."

The last letter from Dallet said that he was heading to Spain on the RMS Queen Mary to join the International Brigades fighting in the Spanish Civil War. Puening met up with Dallet and his best friend Steve Nelson in Cherbourg, and they travelled to Paris together. After a few days there, she returned to London, and they headed south, crossing into Spain where he joined the Mackenzie-Papineau Battalion, a unit composed of American and Canadian volunteers.

Puening wanted to join Dallet in Spain, and finally secured permission to do so. Her trip to Spain was delayed by hospitalization for an operation on August 26, 1937, for what was initially thought to be appendicitis, but which was determined to be ovarian cysts, which were removed by the German doctors. Puening returned to England to recuperate. Before she could depart for Spain, the news arrived that Dallet had been killed in action on October 17, 1937. His letters to her were published as Letters from Spain by Joe Dallet, American Volunteer, to his Wife (1938).

Puening went to see Nelson, who was in Paris, having been wounded in August, and they returned to New York, where she stayed with Nelson and his wife Margaret at their home in Brooklyn for two months. She then headed for Philadelphia to see her friend Zelma Baker, who worked at the Cancer Research Institute at the University of Pennsylvania. Puening enrolled at the University of Pennsylvania. There she met Richard Stewart Harrison, a medical doctor with degrees from Oxford University, who was completing his internship in the US. They were married on November 23, 1938. She later left the Communist Party in the 1930s.

== Marriage to Oppenheimer ==
Soon after, Harrison left for Pasadena, California, for his residency at the California Institute of Technology (Caltech), while Kitty remained in Philadelphia to complete her bachelor's degree in botany at the University of Pennsylvania, and was then offered a postgraduate research fellowship at the University of California, Los Angeles. At Caltech, she worked with physicist Charles Lauritsen: the X-ray laboratory at Caltech used for physics research was also used for experimental cancer therapy research. It was at a garden party thrown by Lauritsen and his wife Sigrid in August 1939 that she met Robert Oppenheimer, a physicist who taught at Caltech for part of each year and the remaining time at University of California, Berkeley. Soon after, they began an affair, one which they did not even attempt to conceal: they were frequently seen around town in Robert's car. At Christmas time she went to Berkeley without her husband, to spend time with Oppenheimer.

Oppenheimer invited Harrison and Kitty to spend the summer at his New Mexico ranch, Perro Caliente. Harrison declined, as he was engaged in his research, but Kitty accepted. Robert Serber and his wife Charlotte collected Kitty in Pasadena, and drove her to Perro Caliente, where they met up with Robert, his brother Frank Oppenheimer, and his wife Jackie. The Serbers had met Kitty before, at Charlotte Serber's parents' house in Philadelphia in 1938. The Serbers loved to ride through the pine and aspen forests and floral meadows of the Sangre de Cristo Mountains, camping with minimal food and equipment. Kitty impressed them with her riding ability; horsemanship was a normal accomplishment for women of her social class, and she had learned to ride as a girl on the riding trails around Aspinwall. Kitty and Robert rode out to stay the night with his friend Katy Page in Los Pinos, New Mexico. The following day Page rode to Perro Caliente on her bay horse to return Kitty's nightgown, which had been left under Robert's pillow.

Kitty later told Anne Wilson that she got Robert to marry her the "old-fashioned way"—by getting pregnant. In September 1940, Robert informed Harrison, and they agreed that the best way forward was for Kitty to get a divorce so she could marry Robert. Soon after, Robert shared a podium with Nelson to raise money for refugees from the Spanish Civil War, and he informed him that he was engaged to Kitty. Nelson's wife was also pregnant, and he named his daughter, who was born in November 1940, Josie in memory of Dallet. To obtain a divorce, Kitty moved to Reno, Nevada, where she stayed for six weeks to meet the state's residency requirements. The divorce was finalized on November 1, 1940, and Kitty married Oppenheimer the following day in a civil ceremony in Virginia City, Nevada, with the court janitor and clerk as witnesses.

== Manhattan Project ==
Their child, a son they named Peter, was born in Pasadena, on May 12, 1941, during Oppenheimer's regular session at Caltech. When they returned to Berkeley, Oppenheimer bought a new house on Eagle Hill Road in adjacent Kensington with a view over the Golden Gate. Kitty worked at the University of California as a laboratory assistant. They left Peter with the Chevaliers and a German nurse and headed out to Perro Caliente for the summer. The holiday was marred when Oppenheimer was trampled by a horse, and Kitty injured her leg when she hit a car in front of her while driving their Cadillac convertible. The United States entered World War II in December 1941, and Oppenheimer began recruiting staff for the Manhattan Project. Among the first were the Serbers, who moved into the apartment over the garage at One Eagle Hill.

On March 16, 1943, the couple boarded a train for Santa Fe, New Mexico. By the end of the month, they had moved to Los Alamos, New Mexico, where they occupied one of the buildings formerly belonging to the Los Alamos Ranch School. Los Alamos was known to the occupants as "the Hill" and to the Manhattan Project as Site Y. Oppenheimer became the director of Project Y. Kitty abdicated the role of post commander's wife to Martha Parsons, the wife of Robert's deputy, Navy Captain William S. Parsons. She put her biologist training to use working for the director of the Health Group at Los Alamos, Louis Hempelmann, conducting blood tests to assess the danger of radiation. Kitty worked at Los Alamos as a lab technician under Hempelmann for one year before she quit. Kitty hosted cocktail parties for groups of women at Los Alamos.

In 1944, Kitty became pregnant again. Her second child, a girl, was born on December 7, 1944. She named her Katherine after her mother and called her Toni. Like other babies born in wartime Los Alamos, Toni's birth certificate gave the place of birth as P.O. Box 1663. In April 1945, Kitty was depressed by the isolation of Los Alamos, and she left Toni with Pat Sherr, the wife of physicist Rubby Sherr; Pat had recently lost her son, Michael, to Sudden Infant Death Syndrome. Kitty returned with Peter to Bethlehem, Pennsylvania, to live with her parents. They returned to Los Alamos in July 1945.

During their time at Los Alamos and continuing throughout their 26 year long marriage, the Oppenheimer couple strongly relied on each other to be their biggest confidants. Kitty was highly esteemed by Robert, who relied on her even through situations involving the secret Los Alamos project.

The revoking of Robert Oppenheimer's security clearance not only revolved around his association with the communist party, especially through Kitty, but also issues with his bold opinions that many scientists and officials did not agree with. These opinions widely revolved around his disapproval of the creation of the hydrogen bomb as well as ethical defense-related issues. It was these opinions combined with their questionable past that would ultimately end their association with the Atomic Energy Commission at Los Alamos.

== Later life ==
By the end of the war in August 1945, Oppenheimer had become a celebrity, and Kitty had become an alcoholic. Kitty was said to get drunk to the point of falling down and passing out. However, Serber claimed that this was due to the medication that she was taking for her painful pancreatitis. She suffered a series of bone fractures from drunken falls and car crashes. In November 1945, Robert left Los Alamos to return to Caltech, but he soon found that his passion was no longer in teaching.

In 1947, Oppenheimer accepted an offer from Lewis Strauss to take up the directorship of the Institute for Advanced Study in Princeton, New Jersey. The job came with rent-free accommodation in the director's house, a ten-bedroom 17th-century manor with a cook and groundskeeper, surrounded by 265 acres (107 ha) of woodlands. Robert had a greenhouse built for Kitty, where she raised orchids; for her birthdays Oppenheimer had rare species flown in from Hawaii. Olden Manor was sometimes known as "Bourbon Manor"; Kitty and Robert liked to keep the liquor cabinet well stocked, and like many of their generation, liked to celebrate cocktail hour with martinis, Manhattans, Old Fashioneds and highballs. Both were also fond of smoking, and Kitty's habit of combining too much alcohol with smoking in bed led to a plethora of holes in her bedding and at least one house fire. She sometimes took too many pills, and suffered from abdominal pains caused by pancreatitis. Pain often prompted outbursts of anger. In 1952, Toni contracted polio, and doctors suggested that a warmer climate might help. The family flew to the Caribbean, where they rented a 72-foot (22 m) ketch. Robert and Kitty discovered a shared love of sailing, while Toni soon recovered. The family spent part of each summer on Saint John in the Virgin Islands, eventually building a beach house there on Gibney Beach.

On January 6, 1967, Robert was diagnosed with inoperable cancer, and died on February 18, 1967. Kitty had his remains cremated and his ashes were placed in an urn, which she took to St. John and dropped into the sea off the coast, within sight of the beach house. The area is known today as "Oppenheimer Beach." Kitty never remarried, but she spent the rest of her life with Robert Serber, an American physicist who also worked on the Manhattan Project. Kitty and Serber would continue to have a platonic relationship, and it is not reported that they ever tried to pursue a romantic relationship. The government would then go on to leave her and Serber alone, regarding communist allegations and trials. Kitty would end up talking him into buying a 52-foot (16 m) yawl, which they sailed from New York to Grenada. In 1972, they purchased a 52-foot (16 m) ketch, where she was the captain. Before she died, she had been planning to sail to Japan via the Panama Canal with Serber. They set out, but Kitty became ill, and was taken to Gorgas Hospital in Panama City, where she died of an embolism in her right arm on October 27, 1972. Serber and Toni had her remains cremated, and they scattered her remains near Carvel Rock in St. Thomas, in the Virgin Islands, near Robert's.

After Kitty's death in 1972, Serber continued to live in the house built for them by Kitty Oppenheimer near Toni. Toni died by suicide in 1977, hanging herself in the backyard of the house built by her father.

== In popular culture ==
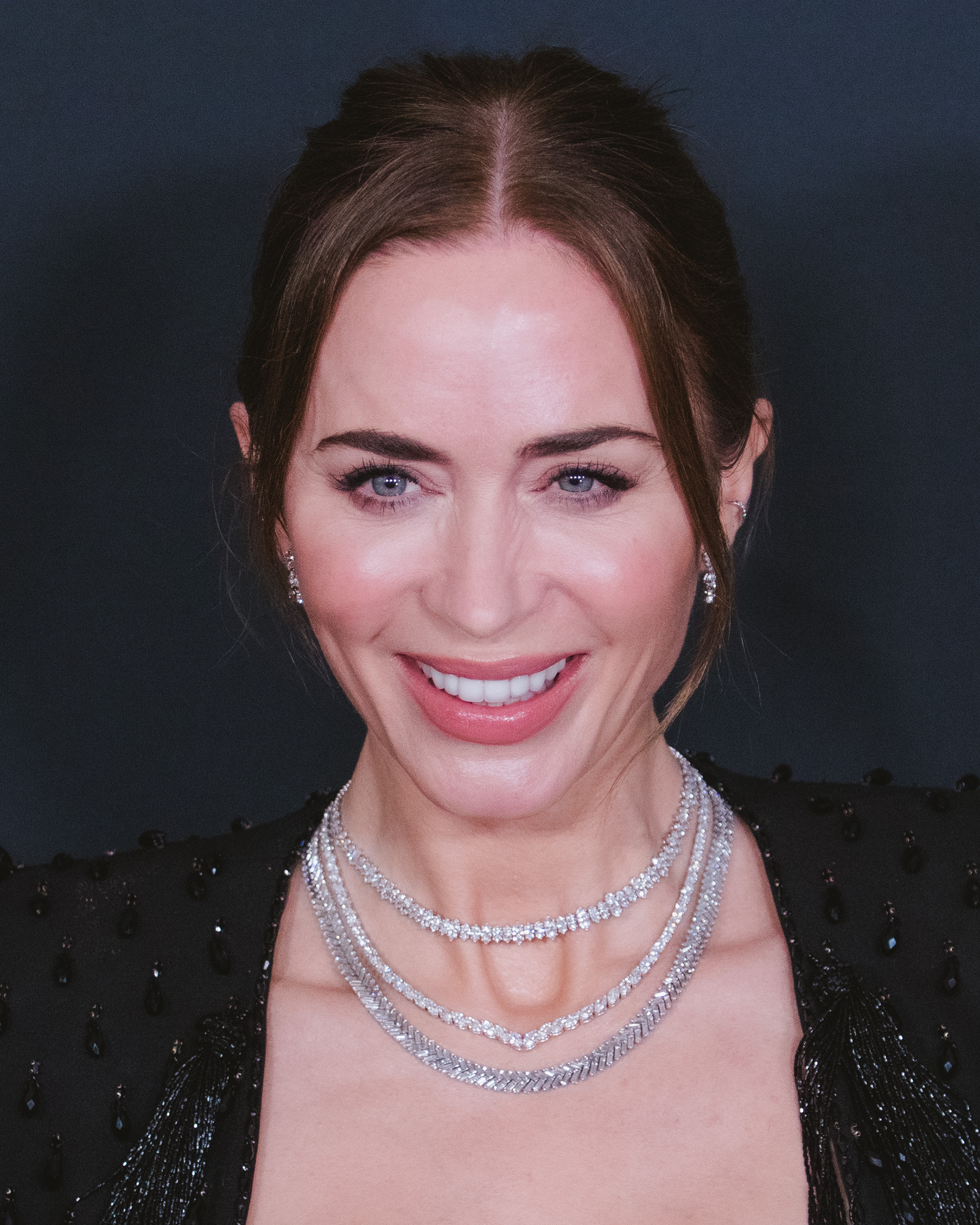
Emily Blunt portrays Kitty in Oppenheimer, for which she was nominated for an Academy Award.

Portrayals of Kitty in popular culture include:

- Jana Shelden in the miniseries Oppenheimer (1980).
- Bonnie Bedelia in the film Fat Man and Little Boy (1989).
- Neve Campbell in the series Manhattan (2015).
- Emily Blunt in the film Oppenheimer (2023), who received a nomination for the Academy Award for Best Supporting Actress among other accolades.

== Sources ==
- Bird, Kai; Sherwin, Martin J. (2005). American Prometheus: The Triumph and Tragedy of J. Robert Oppenheimer. New York: Alfred A. Knopf. ISBN 0-375-41202-6. OCLC 56753298.
- Conant, Jennet (2005). 109 East Palace: Robert Oppenheimer and the Secret City of Los Alamos. New York: Simon & Schuster. ISBN 0-7432-5007-9. OCLC 57475908.
- Serber, Robert; Crease, Robert P. (1998). Peace & War: Reminiscences of a Life on the Frontiers of Science. New York: Columbia University Press. ISBN 978-0-231-10546-0. OCLC 1014748640.
- Stern, Philip M. (1969). The Oppenheimer Case: Security on Trial. New York: Harper & Row. OCLC 31389.
- Streshinsky, Shirley; Klaus, Patricia (2013). An Atomic Love Story: The Extraordinary Women in Robert Oppenheimer's Life. New York: Turner Publishing. ISBN 978-1-61858-019-1. OCLC 849822662.
- Wolverton, Mark (2008). A Life in Twilight: The Final Years of J. Robert Oppenheimer. New York: St. Martin's Press. ISBN 978-0-312-37440-2. OCLC 223882887.
