= Joe Dallet =

American combatant in the Spanish Civil War (1907–1937)

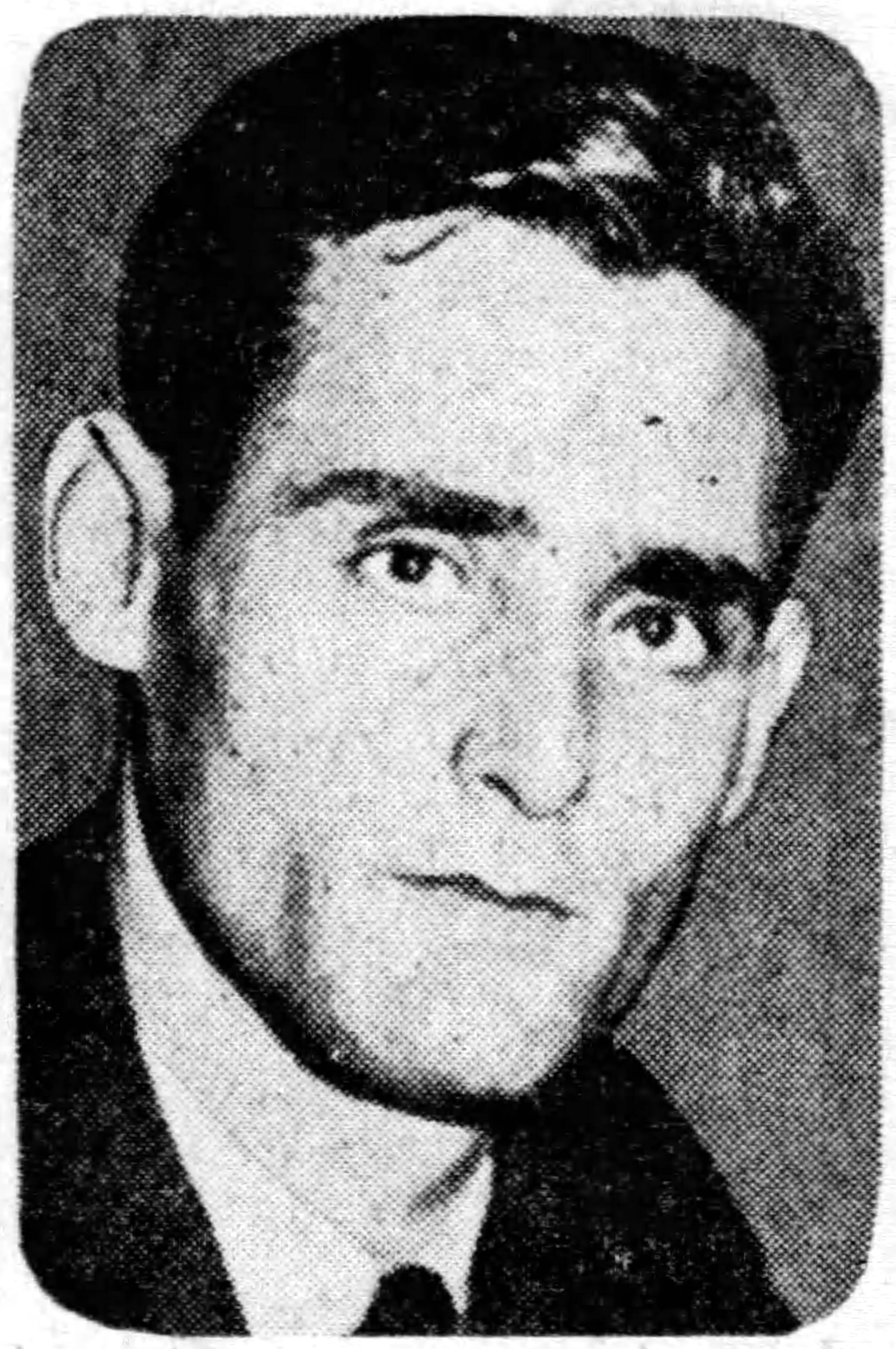
- Born: Joseph Anthony Dallet Jr. February 18, 1907; Cleveland, Ohio, U.S.
- Died: October 13, 1937 (aged 30); Aragon Front, Spain
- Cause of death: Killed in action
- Education: Dartmouth College
- Political party: Communist Party USA
- Spouses: Barbara Rand (m. 1929, divorced) Katherine Puening (m. 1934)
- Military career
- Allegiance: Spanish Republic
- Branch: International Brigades
- Service years: 1937
- Rank: Battalion Commissar
- Unit: Mackenzie-Papineau Battalion
- Conflicts: Spanish Civil War; Battle of Fuentes de Ebro †

Joseph Anthony Dallet Jr. (February 18, 1907 – October 13, 1937) was an American industrial worker, labor and communist organizer. From a wealthy family, Dallet was involved in the American labor movement early on, taking industrial jobs such as docker or steel mill worker. He joined the Communist Party USA, and ran for local U.S. House Of Representatives seats. In 1937, he volunteered for the Republican army in the Spanish Civil War. Dallet was killed in his first battle, on the Aragon front near Fuentes de Ebro.

== Biography ==
Dallet was born in Cleveland, Ohio, and raised in Woodmere, Long Island. His parents were Hilda Dallet (née Stern) and Joseph Dallet Sr, a wealthy silk manufacturer. He attended Woodmere Academy, Lawrence High School, and in 1923 he enrolled at Dartmouth College. He left college in 1927 without graduating and took a job in insurance with Massachusetts Mutual Life.

In 1928 he became active in the labor movement and began working as a longshoreman. He then worked in steel mills in Pennsylvania and Ohio while organizing for the Sheet and Metal Workers Industrial Union. Dallet worked to hide his wealthy upbringing and Jewish background. In 1929 he joined the Communist Party and married Barbara Rand, who he later divorced. Dallet became a well known communist and labor organizer in the Midwest.

In 1934 he became the common law husband of Kitty Puening, who would later marry physicist J. Robert Oppenheimer.

In 1934 and 1936 Dallet was a Communist Party candidate for the U.S. House of Representatives, and in 1935 he ran to be mayor of Youngstown, Ohio.

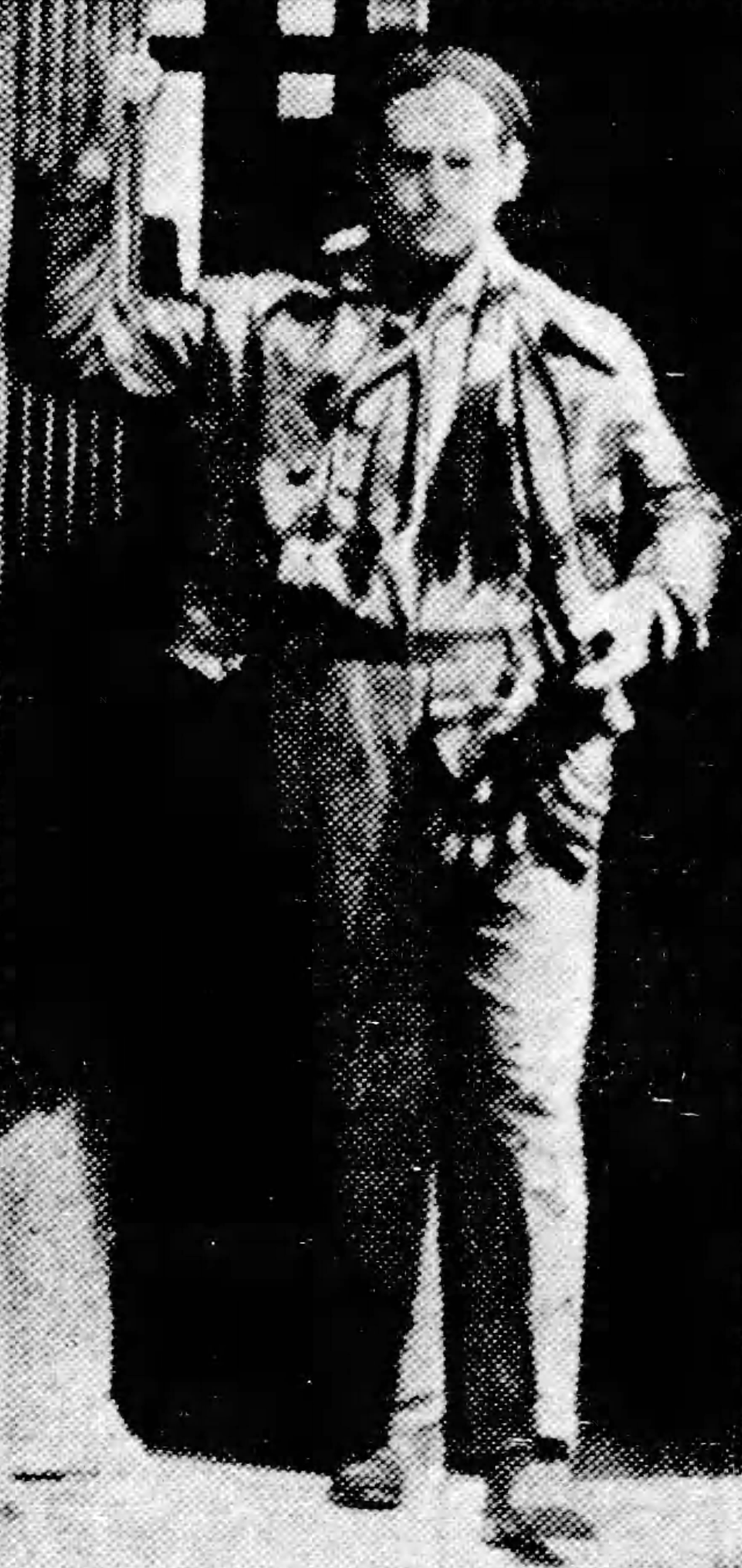
Dallet leaves the police station in Perpignan, France, on his way to serve a jail sentence c. March–April 1937

In March 1937, Dallet sailed for Europe to fight in the Spanish Civil War. On March 27, Dallet and a group of fellow volunteers were arrested by a French border patrol while trying to enter Spain from France by boat. Following a high-profile trial and 21 days in prison they were released. They successfully crossed the Pyrenees into Spain on April 22 under the cover of night. In June 1937, Dallet was appointed political commissar of the Mackenzie–Papineau Battalion under commander Robert G. Thompson.

Dallet's authoritarian leadership style was unpopular with the men serving beneath him, who formed a grievance committee to try and remove him. An overnight meeting was held on October 12 to consider the complaints against Dallet. Dallet tried to resign his position as commissar, but his resignation was rejected. The following day Dallet was shot and killed on the Aragon front near Fuentes de Ebro while advancing in his first battle. (Note: Some sources give the date of his death as October 17, 1937.)

Kitty had been en route to join Dallet in Spain. Dallet's letters to Kitty were published in 1938 in the book Letters From Spain by Joe Dallet: American Volunteer, To His Wife. Dartmouth College awards an annual student prize in Dallet's memory.

== Works ==
- Dallet, Joe (March 1936). "How To Work on W.P.A. Projects". Party Organizer. Vol. IX, no. 3. pp. 21–23.
- Dallet, Joe (1938). Letters From Spain by Joe Dallet: American Volunteer, To His Wife. New York: Workers Library Publishers.
