= John Harry Williams =

Canadian-American physicist (1908–1966)

John H. Williams
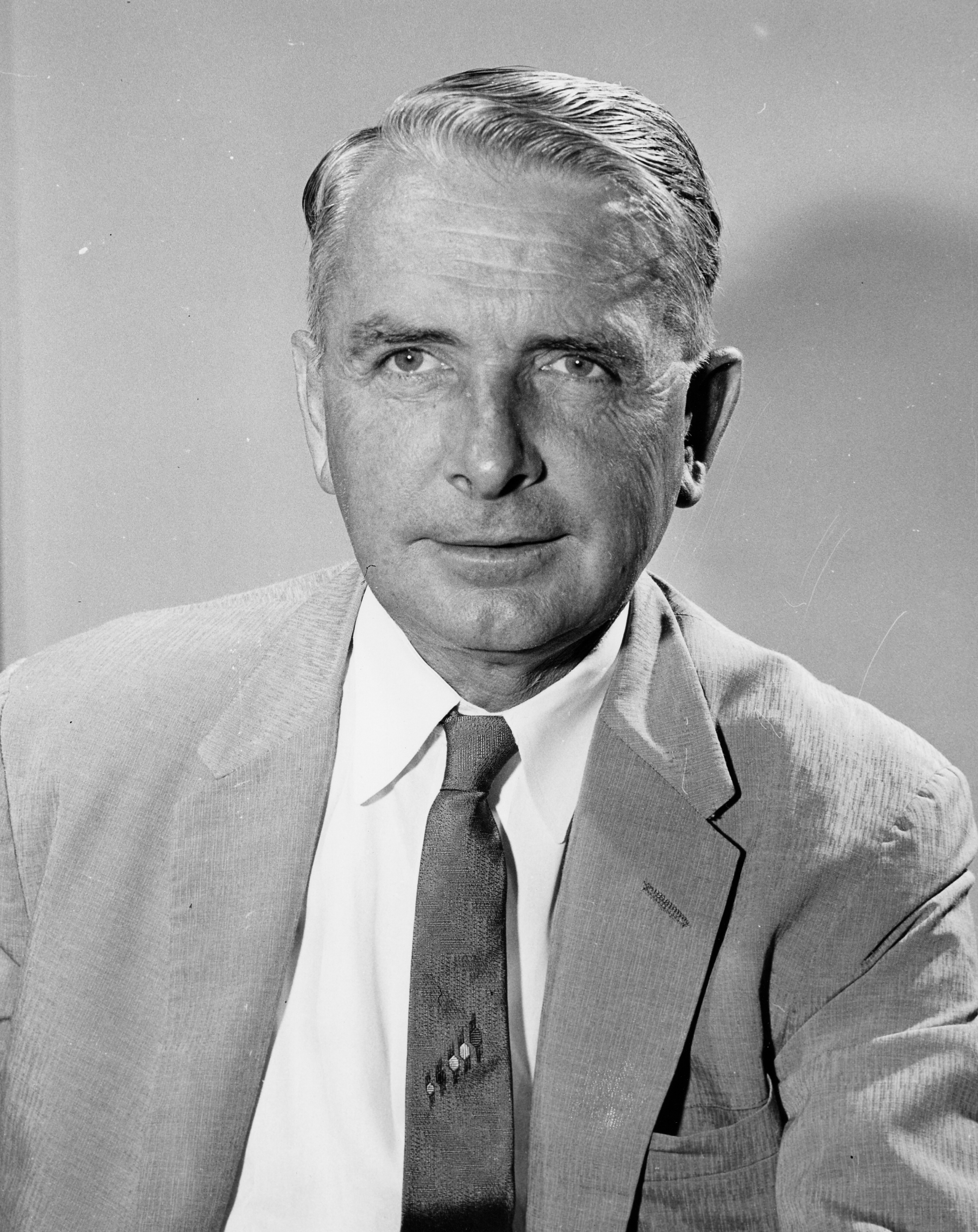
- Born: John Harry Williams; July 7, 1908; Asbestos, Quebec, Canada
- Died: April 18, 1966 (aged 57); Minneapolis, Minnesota, US
- Education: University of British Columbia; University of California, Berkeley
- Spouse: Vera Martin
- Children: 3

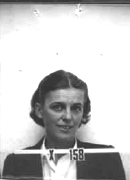
Vera Williams

John Harry Williams (July 7, 1908 – April 18, 1966) was a Canadian-American physicist. He was a professor of physics at the University of Minnesota. During World War II he worked on the Manhattan Project. He was a researcher at the Atomic Energy Commission and in 1959 he was appointed Atomic Energy Commissioner.

== Biography ==
Born in the asbestos mining town of Asbestos, Quebec, he had three brothers: Elewyn, Lloyd, and Arthur. John was an active child and participated in sports, developing a lifelong interest in the outdoors. His father, a mining engineer, died during the First World War, leaving his wife Josephine Stockwell to raise the family alone. She moved the family to Kelowna, British Columbia, where John attended public high school. He matriculated to the University of British Columbia on a full scholarship, where he graduated with a BS degree in 1928. During his last year at the university, he was married to Vera Martin; the couple had three children. Williams performed his graduate studies at the University of California, Berkeley, where he was awarded an MA degree in 1930 and a PhD the following year. In his first year of graduate school he published his first paper about a double crystal x-ray spectrometer.

He joined the University of Chicago with a postdoctoral fellowship from the National Research Council during 1931–1933, then became an instructor of physics at the University of Minnesota. In 1934 he was named assistant professor, then associate professor in 1937 and full professor in 1946. Williams remained a member of the University of Minnesota physics faculty for the remainder of his career. Initially, his work at Minnesota was in the field of ionization and dissociation of gases, but he developed an interest in nuclear physics. Together with William H. Wells, he worked on a Van de Graaff generator with the goal of generating 1 MeV of energy for nuclear physics research. This was found insufficiently energetic, so in 1937 funds were obtained from the Rockefeller Foundation for construction of a 3 MeV generator.

During the Second World War, he obtained his US citizenship and became a contract researcher for the US Office of Scientific Research and Development in 1942, then during 1943–46 he served as head of the Electrostatic Generator Group for the Manhattan Project, being placed in charge of Van de Graaff work. He began a study of neutron cross-section measurements for the atomic bomb program. In 1945, he was deputy director of the first atomic bomb explosion, known as Trinity. He assisted with the Bikini atomic experiments in 1946 before returning to his position at the University of Minnesota. In 1951 at the age of 43, it was discovered that he had cancer. He underwent medical treatment in an effort to combat the condition, which was finally brought under limited control in 1960. However, he suffered flare ups that lasted for the remainder of his life.

Williams was instrumental in obtaining funding from the Atomic Energy Commission for the construction of a 50-MeV linear proton accelerator at the university, which became operational during the 1950s. During 1955–58 he served on the board of the Midwest Universities Research Association, and was the president in 1956–57. He was appointed director of the research division for the Atomic Energy Commission in 1958. The following year he was appointed Atomic Energy Commissioner by US President Dwight D. Eisenhower. From 1960 to 1966, he was a member of the general advisory committee for the United States Atomic Energy Commission. He was elected to the National Academy of Sciences in 1961 and was president of the American Physical Society in 1963. In 1965, he was named as president of the Argonne Universities Association.

Williams died of pneumonia in Minneapolis, Minnesota, on April 18, 1966. During his career, he was awarded honorary doctorate of science by the University of British Columbia and an honorary doctorate of engineering from the Pennsylvania Military College.
