= Naval Radiological Defense Laboratory =

Military laboratory

Coordinates: 37°43′32.18″N 122°22′8.19″W

The United States Naval Radiological Defense Laboratory (NRDL) was an early military lab created to study the effects of radiation and nuclear weapons. The facility was based at the Hunter's Point Naval Shipyard in San Francisco, California.

== History ==
The NRDL was formed in 1946 to manage testing, decontamination, and disposition of US Navy ships contaminated by the Operation Crossroads nuclear tests in the Pacific. A number of ships that survived the atomic detonations were towed to Hunter's Point for detailed study and decontamination. Some of the ships were cleaned and sold for scrap. The aircraft carrier USS Independence, which had been heavily damaged and contaminated with nuclear fallout by Operation Crossroads explosions in July 1946, was brought to the NRDL for study. After years of trying in vain to decontaminate the ship enough that it could be safely sold for scrap, the Navy ultimately packed the ship full of nuclear waste and scuttled the radioactive hulk off California near the Farallon Islands in January 1951. The ship's wreck was discovered resting upright under 790 m of water in 2009.

The NRDL used several buildings at the Hunter's Point shipyard from 1946 to 1969. Working with the newly formed US Atomic Energy Commission (predecessor to the U.S. Nuclear Regulatory Commission established in 1974), the Navy conducted a wide variety of radiation experiments on materials and animals at the lab, including the construction of a cyclotron on the site for use in radiation experiments and storage for various nuclear materials.

=== Activities ===
An article published 2 May 2001 in SF Weekly detailed various aspects of nuclear testing at NRDL from declassified records:

The NRDL often experimented with and disposed of nuclear material with little apparent concern that it was operating in the middle of a major metropolitan area. Among other things, historical documents show, scientists at the NRDL:

- – Oversaw the dumping of huge amounts of contaminated sand and acid into San Francisco Bay after they were used in attempts to clean irradiated ships.
- – Spread radioactive material on- and off-base, as if it were fertilizer, to practice decontamination.
- – Burned radioactive fuel oil in a boiler, discharging the smoke into the atmosphere.
- – Sold radioactive ships as scrap metal to a private company in Alameda.
- – Hung a source of cobalt-60, a nuclear isotope that emits high-energy electromagnetic radiation similar to X-rays, in San Francisco Bay for two weeks, apparently just to see what would happen.
- – Conducted human experiments that included requiring people to drink radioactive elements.
- – Experimented with significant amounts of a wide variety of long-lived radiological poisons, including plutonium, cesium, uranium, thorium and radium.
- – Studied and disposed of thousands of irradiated mice, rats, dogs, goats, mules, and pigs, among other animals. At one point, the lab owned a ranch in Contra Costa County used specifically to raise animals for radiation testing.
- – Sought permission to dump 1,000 gallons of liquid waste containing "small amounts of fission products" into San Francisco Bay, as an experiment to study how tidal action would dilute the radioactivity. The experiment was meant as a precursor to the disposal of 1,000 gallons of liquid radioactive waste in the bay every day. (The documents do not say whether the experiment or the daily dumping occurred.)

— Davis, Lisa, Fallout, SF Weekly

=== Contamination ===
The first use of radioactive materials at NRDL predated the issuing of licenses by the Atomic Energy Commission, but the AEC later issued licenses for a broad spectrum of radioactive materials to be used in research at the NRDL. Radioactive materials specific to nuclear weapon testing were exempted from AEC licensing. For closure of the NRDL in 1969, the AEC issued licenses for decommissioning activities. AEC licenses for the shipyard and NRDL were terminated in the 1970s.

The NRDL testing and decontamination activities caused significant contamination of the shipyard site. The NRDL and the military radiation training school at nearby Naval Station Treasure Island loaded the nuclear waste left from experiments into steel barrels and sent weekly barges to dump them offshore near the Gulf of the Farallons, which is a US National Wildlife Refuge and a major commercial fishery. Between 1946 and 1970, records estimate the lab and naval station dumped an estimated 47,000 drums of nuclear waste in the Pacific Ocean 30 miles west of San Francisco, creating the first and largest offshore nuclear waste dump in the United States. The USGS states the barrels contain only "low-level radioactive waste," but this is disputed by historical records and experts.

The US Navy completed a Historical Radiological Assessment of the Hunter's Point Shipyard in 2004, including the known NRDL facilities on the property, years after the SF Weekly article cited declassified documents showing that many sites and buildings used by NRDL were not included in the Navy's list of sites with potential for radiological contamination. Many of the buildings formerly used by NRDL had been razed by that point.

The former shipyard site is still being decontaminated, and has been split into multiple parcels to allow the Navy to declare them clean and safe for redevelopment separately. While Lennar has built and sold hundreds of new condominium units on the site of the former Hunters Point Naval Shipyard, regulators, activists, and cleanup workers have claimed that the site is still heavily contaminated and that the company contracted to handle the cleanup and testing, Tetra Tech, has repeatedly violated established cleanup protocols, deliberately falsified radiation test results at the site to falsely show that there is little remaining radiation, and fired employees who attempted to force workers to perform radiation tests as required.
