= A. Carl Helmholz =

American nuclear physicist

August Carl Helmholz
- Born: May 24, 1915; Evanston, Illinois
- Died: October 29, 2003 (aged 88); Lafayette, California
- Education: University of California, Berkeley; Harvard University
- Awards: Fellow, American Physical Society
- Scientific career
- Fields: Nuclear physics
- Workplaces: University of California, Berkeley; Lawrence Berkeley National Laboratory
- Doctoral advisor: Edwin McMillan; Ernest O. Lawrence
- Doctoral students: Barry Barish; Lawrence W. Jones; Cyrus Levinthal; Kent Terwilliger

August Carl Helmholz (May 24, 1915 – October 29, 2003) was an American nuclear physicist known for his contributions to high energy particle physics.

== Early life and education ==
Helmholz was born in Evanston, Illinois on May 24, 1915. He attended the Shattuck School military academy in Faribault, Minnesota, following which he went to Harvard University for his undergraduate education. In 1936, Helmholz won a fellowship to study at the Cambridge University for one year. On the advice of his family neighbour and future Nobel laureate Luis Alvarez, Helmholz moved to the University of California, Berkeley for his graduate education.

== Career ==
At Berkeley, he worked with Ernest Lawrence and Edwin McMillan at the Berkeley Radiation Laboratory (which later became the Lawrence Berkeley National Laboratory) on radioactive materials. In 1942, Helmholz worked with the Manhattan Project for using cyclotron magnets to separate uranium which was later used in the development of the first atomic bomb.

Helmholz joined the UC Berkeley physics department as an assistant professor in 1943. He worked on synchrotron accelerators to study the properties of high-energy particle interactions. Helmholz along with Burton Moyer made one of the first measurements of resonances in subatomic physics in the pion-nucleon interaction. Over his career at Berkeley, Helmholz supervised more than sixty doctoral students. He also served as the chair of the UC Berkeley physics department from 1955 to 1962.
