= Aqueous homogeneous reactor =

Type of nuclear reactor

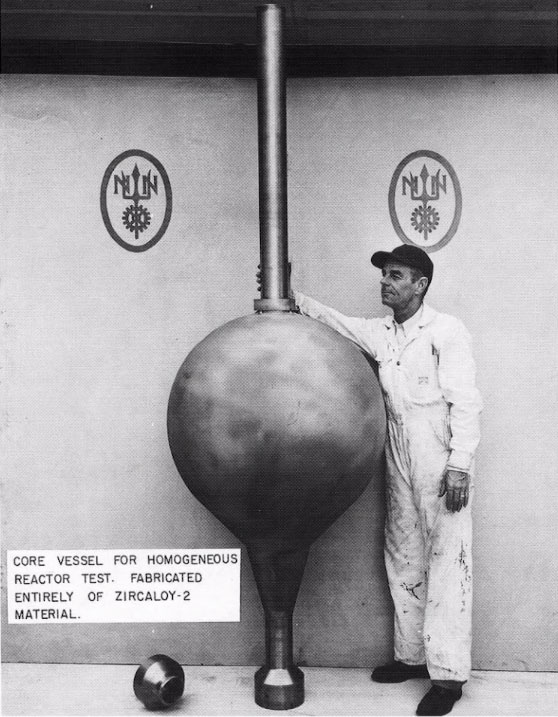
Aqueous homogeneous reactor at Oak Ridge National Laboratory

Aqueous homogeneous reactors (AHR) is a two-chamber reactor consisting of an interior reactor chamber and an outside cooling and moderating jacket chamber. They are a type of nuclear reactor in which soluble nuclear salts (usually uranium sulfate or uranium nitrate) are dissolved in water. The fuel is mixed with heavy or light water which partially moderates and cools the reactor. The outside layer of the reactor has more water which also partially cools and acts as a moderator. The water can be either heavy water or ordinary (light) water, which slows neutrons and helps facilitate a stable reaction, both of which need to be very pure.

Their self-controlling features and ability to handle very large increases in reactivity make them unique among reactors, and possibly safest. At Santa Susana, California, Atomics International performed a series of tests titled The Kinetic Energy Experiments. In the late 1940s, control rods were loaded on springs and then flung out of the reactor in milliseconds. Reactor power shot up from ~100 watts to over ~1,000,000 watts with no problems observed.

Aqueous homogeneous reactors were sometimes called "water boilers" (not to be confused with boiling water reactors), as the water inside appears to boil, though the bubbling is actually due to the production of hydrogen and oxygen as radiation and fission particles dissociate the water into its constituent gases, a process called radiolysis. AHRs were widely used as research reactors as they are self-controlling, have very high neutron fluxes, and were easy to manage. As of April 2006, only five AHRs were operating according to the Research Reactor database.

Corrosion problems associated with sulfate base solutions limited their application as breeders of uranium-233 fuels from thorium. Current designs use nitric acid base solutions (e.g. uranyl nitrate) eliminating most of these problems in stainless steels.

== History ==
Initial studies of homogeneous reactors took place toward the close of World War II. It pained chemists to see precisely fabricated solid-fuel elements of heterogeneous reactors eventually dissolved in acids to remove fission products—the "ashes" of a nuclear reaction. Chemical engineers hoped to design liquid-fuel reactors that would dispense with the costly destruction and processing of solid fuel elements. The formation of gas bubbles in liquid fuels and the corrosive attack on materials (in uranyl sulfate base solutions), however, presented daunting design and materials challenges.

Enrico Fermi advocated construction at Los Alamos of what was to become the world’s third reactor, the first homogeneous liquid-fuel reactor, and the first reactor to be fueled by uranium enriched in uranium-235. Eventually three versions were built, all based on the same concept. For security purposes these reactors were given the code name "water boilers". The name was appropriate because in the higher power versions the fuel solution appeared to boil as hydrogen and oxygen bubbles were formed through decomposition of the water solvent by the energetic fission products, a process called radiolysis.

The reactor was called LOPO (for low power) because its power output was virtually zero. LOPO served the purposes for which it had been intended: determination of the critical mass of a simple fuel configuration and testing of a new reactor concept. LOPO achieved criticality in May 1944, after one final addition of enriched uranium. Enrico Fermi himself was at the controls. LOPO was dismantled to make way for a second Water Boiler that could be operated at power levels up to 5.5 kilowatts. Named HYPO (for high power), this version used solution of uranyl nitrate as fuel whereas the earlier device had used enriched uranyl sulfate. This reactor became operative in December 1944. Many of the key neutron measurements needed in the design of the early atomic bombs were made with HYPO. By 1950 higher neutron fluxes were desirable, consequently, extensive modifications were made to HYPO to permit operation at power levels up to 35 kilowatts. This reactor was, of course, named SUPO. SUPO was operated almost daily until its deactivation in 1974.

In 1952, two sets of critical experiments with heavy water solutions of enriched uranium as uranyl fluoride were carried out at Los Alamos to support an idea of Edward Teller about weapon design. By the time the experiments were completed, Teller had lost interest, however the results were then applied to improve the earlier reactors. In one set of experiments the solution was in 25-and-30-inch diameter (640 and 760 mm) tanks without a surrounding reflector. Solution heights were adjusted to criticality with D_{2}O solutions at D/^{235}U atomic ratios of 1:230 and 1:419 in the smaller tank and 1:856 to 1:2081 in the larger tank. In the other set of experiments solution spheres were centered in a 35-inch diameter (890 mm) spherical container into which D_{2}O was pumped from a reservoir at the base. Criticality was attained in six solution spheres from 13.5- to 18.5-inch diameter at D/^{235}U atomic ratios from 1:34 to 1:431. On completion of the experiment that equipment too was retired.

In 2024 a nuclear power startup company, CalThermo, was designing a 3D printed AHR microreactor intended to produce hydrogen for fuel use.

== Homogeneous reactor experiment ==
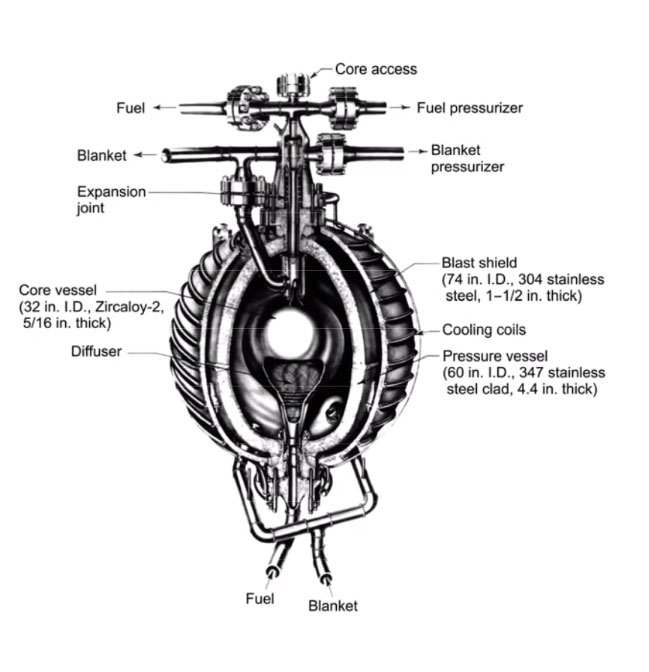
Aqueous homogeneous reactor at Oak Ridge National Laboratory

The first aqueous homogeneous reactor built at Oak Ridge National Laboratory went critical October 1952. The design power level of one megawatt (MW) was attained in February 1953. The reactor's high-pressure steam twirled a small turbine that generated 150 kilowatts (kW) of electricity, an accomplishment that earned its operators the honorary title "Oak Ridge Power Company." However AEC was committed to development of solid-fuel reactors cooled with water and laboratory demonstrations of other reactor types, regardless of their success, did not alter its course.

== KEMA Suspensie Test Reactor ==
From 1974 till 1979 the KEMA (Keuring van Elektrotechnische Materialen Arnhem) operated an aqueous homogeneous reactor, called KEMA Suspensie Test Reactor (KSTR) on their site at Arnhem in the Netherlands. The reactor was built in cooperation with experts from ORNL (Oak Ridge National Laboratory) because of their experience with the homogeneous reactor experiment. The reactor consisted of a reactor vessel (ø310 mm, content 18.3 liter), manufactured by Werkspoor in Utrecht. The fuel was a mixture of 14% UO_{2} (highly enriched, 90% ^{235}U) and 86% ThO_{2} in a concentration of 400 g/L. The Uranium (6766 grams, containing 6082 grams of ^{235}U) was delivered by NUKEM. The fuel grains (ø 5μm) were designed by KEMA via a unique so-called sol-gel process, which also attracted attention from the industry. The reactor operated at a temperature of 255 °C (491 °F; 528 K), a pressure of 60 bar (6,000 kPa) and a maximum power of 1,000 kW (1,300 hp).

== The ARGUS reactor ==
Environmentally friendly and economically competitive techniques of radioactive isotope production were being developed at the Kurchatov Institute in USSR, on the base of the ARGUS reactor – an aqueous homogeneous mini reactor. The USSR was planning to build a series of this type of reactor, however, only two have been built: one in Kurchatov Institute and second was built in the late '80s in Dushanbe, Tajik SSR. However, these did not go into operation due to collapse of the Soviet Union.

In 2017 the Tajik government started reconstructing and fixing its reactor to produce molybdenum-99 primarily for medical use.

The reactor in the Kurchatov Institute, with 20 kW thermal output power, has been in operation since 1981 and has shown high indices of efficiency and safety. Feasibility studies to develop techniques for strontium-89 and molybdenum-99 production in this reactor are currently underway. An analysis of the isotopes produced, performed at the National Institute of Radioactive Elements in Belgium, has shown that the Mo-99 samples produced at ARGUS are characterized by extreme radiochemical purity, i.e. the impurity content in them is lower than the allowable limits by 2–4 orders of magnitude. Among the radioactive medical isotopes, Mo-99 and Sr-89 are widespread. The first one is a raw material for production of technetium-99m, a radiopharmaceutical preparation for diagnostics of oncological, cardiological, urological, and other diseases. More than 6 million people are examined with this isotope each year in Europe.

== Tc-99m production ==
The ability to extract medical isotopes directly from in-line fuel has sparked renewed interest in aqueous homogeneous reactors based on this design. BWX Technologies (formerly Babcock & Wilcox) has proposed an aqueous homogeneous reactor for Tc-99m production.

== Other research ==
The use of an aqueous homogeneous nuclear fission reactor for the simultaneous hydrogen production by water radiolysis and process heat production was examined at the University of Michigan, in Ann Arbor in 1975. Several small research projects continue this line of inquiry in Europe.

Atomics International designed and built a range of low power (5 to 50,000 watts thermal) nuclear reactors for research, training, and isotope production purposes. One reactor model, the L-54, was purchased and installed by a number of United States universities and foreign research institutions, including Japan.

== See also ==
- Molten salt reactor – Type of nuclear reactor cooled by molten material
- Nuclear fission – Reaction that splits an atomic nucleus
- Nuclear meltdown – Reactor accident due to core overheating
- Nuclear power plant – Thermal power station where the heat source is a nuclear reactor
- Nuclear power – Power generated from nuclear reactions
- Nuclear reactor – Device for controlled nuclear reactions
- Nuclear salt-water rocket – Proposed rocket propulsion mechanism
- Nuclear waste – Unusable radioactive materials
