= Uranyl sulfate =

- O=U=O[SO_{4}]

Identifiers
CAS Number	anhydrous:: 1314-64-3; trihdyrate:: 20910-28-5
3D model (JSmol)	anhydrous:: Interactive image; monohdyrate:: Interactive image; dihdyrate:: Interactive image; trihdyrate:: Interactive image; pentahydrate:: Interactive image
ChemSpider	anhydrous:: 14131
ECHA InfoCard	100.013.856
EC Number	anhydrous:: 215-240-3
PubChem CID	anhydrous:: 14815; monohdyrate:: 129703883; dihdyrate:: 129772678; trihdyrate:: 71587042; pentahydrate:: 129763198
UNII	trihdyrate:: 63MHT04U9C
UN number	2909
CompTox Dashboard (EPA)	anhydrous:: DTXSID40893736
- InChI: InChI=1S/H2O4S.2O.U/c1-5(2,3)4;;;/h(H2,1,2,3,4);;;/q;;;+2/p-2 Key: XEZIPWHQHLVFHG-UHFFFAOYSA-L; monohdyrate:: InChI=1S/H2O4S.H2O.2O.U/c1-5(2,3)4;;;;/h(H2,1,2,3,4);1H2;;;/q;;;;+2/p-2 Key: GSSXPGLZRCAGDP-UHFFFAOYSA-L; dihdyrate:: InChI=1S/H2O4S.2H2O.2O.U/c1-5(2,3)4;;;;;/h(H2,1,2,3,4);2*1H2;;;/q;;;;;+2/p-2 Key: PJGZKVQRFYKDMB-UHFFFAOYSA-L; trihdyrate:: InChI=1S/H2O4S.3H2O.2O.U/c1-5(2,3)4;;;;;;/h(H2,1,2,3,4);3*1H2;;;/q;;;;2*-2;/p-2 Key: SBCFBOOTSWECOA-UHFFFAOYSA-L; pentahydrate:: InChI=1S/H2O4S.5H2O.2O.U/c1-5(2,3)4;;;;;;;;/h(H2,1,2,3,4);5*1H2;;;/q;;;;;;;;+2/p-2 Key: FJVCKQOAEFENSP-UHFFFAOYSA-L
- SMILES: anhydrous:: [O-]S(=O)(=O)[O-].O=[U+2]=O; monohdyrate:: O.[O-]S(=O)(=O)[O-].O=[U+2]=O; dihdyrate:: O.O.[O-]S(=O)(=O)[O-].O=[U+2]=O; trihdyrate:: O.O.O.[O-2].[O-2].[O-]S(=O)(=O)[O-].[U]; pentahydrate:: O.O.O.O.O.[O-]S(=O)(=O)[O-].O=[U+2]=O

Properties
Chemical formula	UO_{2}SO_{4}
Molar mass	366.09 g/mol
Density	3.28 g/cm^{3} @ 20 °C
Solubility in water	27.5 g/100 mL in water at 25 °C

Related compounds
Other anions	Uranyl chloride Uranyl nitrate Uranyl carbonate
Related compounds	Uranium dioxide
- Except where otherwise noted, data are given for materials in their standard state (at 25 °C [77 °F], 100 kPa). verify (what is ?) Infobox references

Uranyl sulfate describes a family of inorganic compounds with the formula UO_{2}SO_{4}(H_{2}O)_{n}. These salts consist of sulfate, the uranyl ion, and water. They are lemon-yellow solids. Uranyl sulfates are intermediates in some extraction methods used for uranium ores. These compounds can also take the form of an anhydrous salt.

== Structure ==
The structure of UO_{2}(SO_{4})(H_{2}O)_{3.5} is illustrative of the uranyl sulfates. The trans-UO_{2}^{2+} centers are encased in a pentagonal bipyramidal coordination sphere. In the pentagonal plane are five oxygen ligands derived from sulfate and aquo ligands. The compound is a coordination polymer.

== Uses ==
Aside from the large scale use in mining, uranyl sulfate finds some use as a negative stain in microscopy and tracer in biology. The Aqueous Homogeneous Reactor experiment, constructed in 1951, circulated a fuel composed of 565 grams of U-235 enriched to 14.7% in the form of uranyl sulfate.

The acid process of milling uranium ores involves precipitating uranyl sulfate from the pregnant leaching solution to produce the semi-refined product referred to as yellowcake.

== Related compounds ==
- the hydrogensulfate.
- potassium uranyl sulfate, K_{2}UO_{2}(SO_{4})_{2}, is a double salt used by Henri Becquerel in his discovery of radioactivity.
