= Uranyl nitrate =

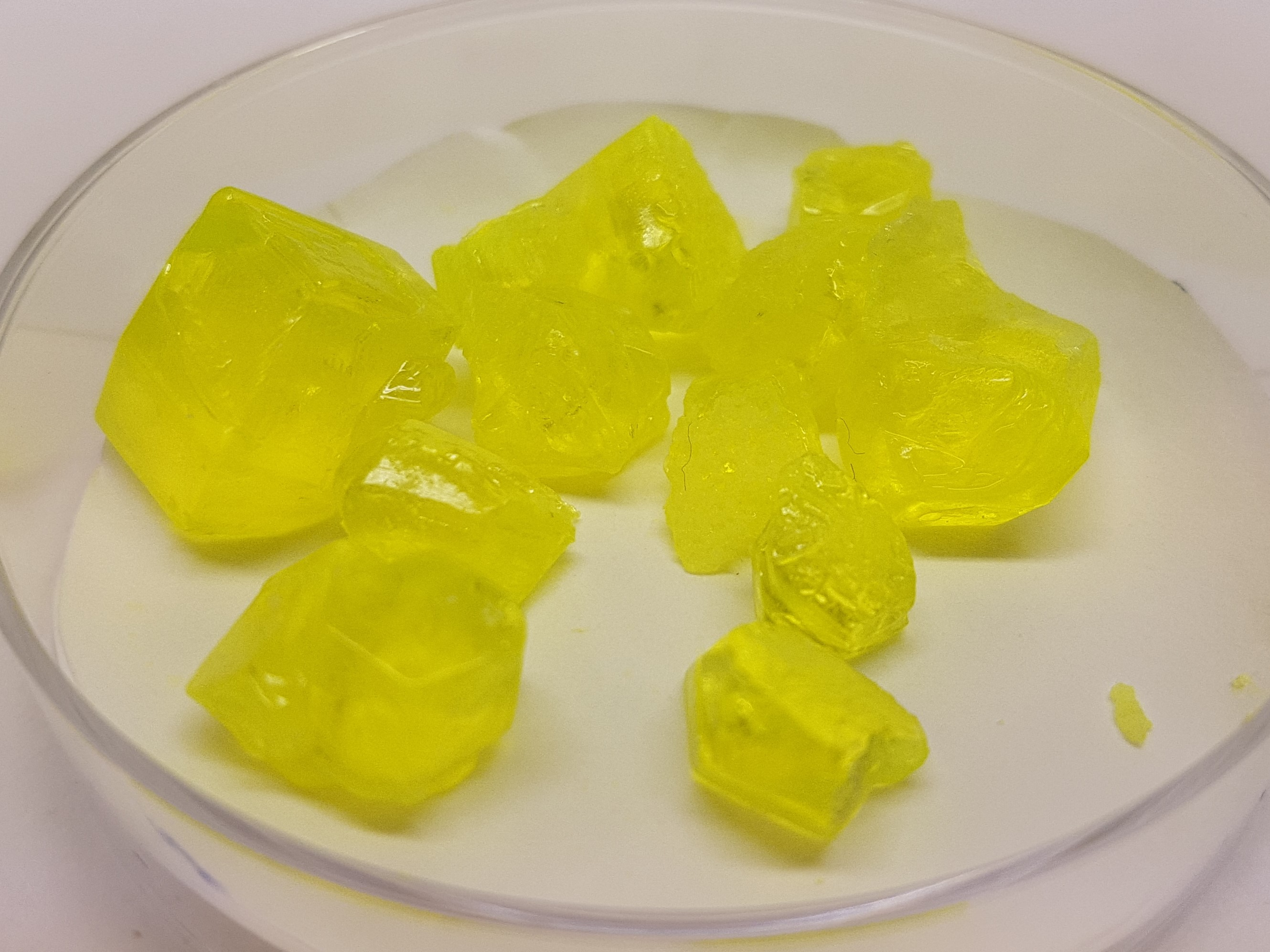
- Uranyl nitrate as yellow crystals

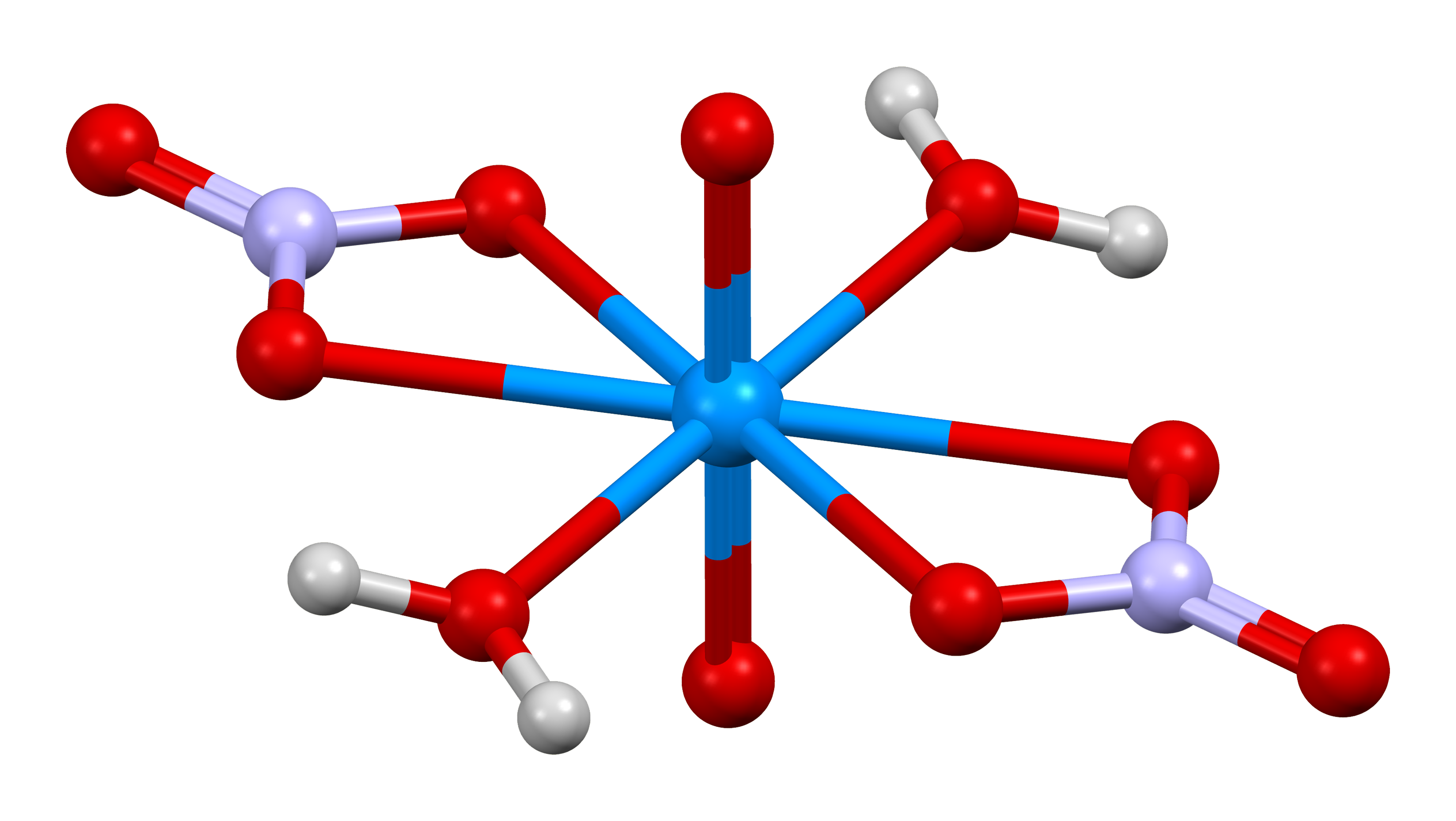

Names
- IUPAC name (T-4)-bis(nitrato-κO)dioxouranium
- Other names Uranium nitrate, Yellow salt

Identifiers
| CAS Number | anhydrous: 10102-06-4; hexahydrate: 13520-83-7 |
| 3D model (JSmol) | anhydrous: Interactive image; dihydrate: Interactive image; hexahydrate: Interactive image |
| ChemSpider | anhydrous: 22177973; hexahydrate: 55548 |
| ECHA InfoCard | 100.030.229 |
| EC Number | anhydrous: 233-266-3 |
| PubChem CID | anhydrous: 24933; dihydrate: 22763670; hexahydrate: 61640 |
| RTECS number | hexahydrate: YR3850000 |
| UNII | anhydrous: 0C0WI17JYF |
| CompTox Dashboard (EPA) | anhydrous: DTXSID2037136 |
- InChI: anhydrous: InChI=1S/2NO3.2O.U/c2*2-1(3)4;;;/q2*-1;;; Key: QWDZADMNIUIMTC-UHFFFAOYSA-N; dihydrate: InChI=1S/2NO3.2H2O.2O.U/c2*2-1(3)4;;;;;/h;;2*1H2;;;/q2*-1;;;;;+2 Key: SUFYIOKRRLBZBE-UHFFFAOYSA-N; hexahydrate: InChI=1S/2HNO3.6H2O.2O.U/c2*2-1(3)4;;;;;;;;;/h2*(H,2,3,4);6*1H2;;; Key: WRIBVRZWDPGVQH-UHFFFAOYSA-N
- SMILES: anhydrous: [N+](=O)([O-])[O-].O=[U+2]=O.[O-][N+](=O)[O-]; dihydrate: [N+](=O)([O-])[O-].[N+](=O)([O-])[O-].O.O.O=[U+2]=O; hexahydrate: [N+](=O)(O)[O-].[N+](=O)(O)[O-].O.O.O.O.O.O.O=[U]=O

Properties
| Chemical formula | UO_{2}(NO_{3})_{2}·2H_{2}O (dihydrate); UO_{2}(NO_{3})_{2}·3H_{2}O (trihydrate); UO_{2}(NO_{3})_{2}·6H_{2}O (hexahydrate) |
| Molar mass | 430.07 g⋅mol^{−1} (dihydrate); 448.08 g⋅mol^{−1} (trihydrate); 502.13 g⋅mol^{−1} (hexahydrate) |
| Appearance | yellow-green solid, hygroscopic |
| Density | 3.5 g/cm^{3} (dihydrate) |
| Melting point | 60.2 °C (140.4 °F; 333.3 K) (hexahydrate) |
| Boiling point | 118 °C (244 °F; 391 K) (hexahydrate, decomposition) |
| Solubility in water | 98 g/100g (0 °C (32 °F; 273 K)); 122 g/100g (20 °C (68 °F; 293 K)); 474 g/100g (100 °C (212 °F; 373 K)) |
| Solubility in tributyl phosphate | soluble |

Hazards
- GHS labelling
| Pictograms | (GHS03: Oxidizing) (GHS06: Toxic) (GHS08: Health hazard) (GHS09: Environmental hazard) |
| Signal word | Danger |
| Hazard statements | H300, H330, H373, H411 |
| Precautionary statements | P260, P264, P270, P271, P273, P284, P301+P316, P304+P340, P316, P319, P320, P321, P330, P391, P403+P233, P405, P501 |
| NFPA 704 (fire diamond) | 3 0 0 OX |
| Threshold limit value (TLV) | 0.2 mg/m^{3} (TWA), 0.6 mg/m^{3} (STEL) |
- Lethal dose or concentration (LD, LC)
| LD_{Lo} (lowest published) | 12 mg/kg (dog, oral); 238 mg/kg (cat, oral) |
- NIOSH (US health exposure limits)
| PEL (Permissible) | 0.05 mg/m^{3} (as Uranium) |
| REL (Recommended) | 0.05 mg/m^{3} (as Uranium) |

Related compounds
| Other anions | Uranyl chloride; Uranyl sulfate |
- Except where otherwise noted, data are given for materials in their standard state (at 25 °C [77 °F], 100 kPa). verify (what is ?) Infobox references

Uranyl nitrate is a water-soluble yellow uranium salt with the formula UO_{2}(NO_{3})_{2}·nH_{2}O. The hexa-, tri-, and dihydrates are known. The compound is mainly of interest because it is an intermediate in the preparation of nuclear fuels. In the nuclear industry, it is commonly referred to as yellow salt.

Uranyl nitrate can be prepared by reaction of uranium salts with nitric acid. It is soluble in water, ethanol, and acetone. As determined by neutron diffraction, the uranyl center is characteristically linear with short U=O distances. In the equatorial plane of the complex are six U−O bonds to bidentate nitrate and two water ligands. At 245 pm, these U−O bonds are much longer than the U=O bonds of the uranyl center.

== Uses ==
=== Processing of nuclear fuels ===
Uranyl nitrate is important for nuclear reprocessing. It is the compound of uranium that results from dissolving yellowcake or decladded spent nuclear fuel rods in nitric acid, for further separation and preparation of uranium hexafluoride for isotope separation for preparing of enriched uranium. A special property of uranyl nitrate is its solubility in tributyl phosphate (PO(OC_{4}H_{9})_{3}), which allows uranium to be extracted from the nitric acid solution. Its high solubility is attributed to the formation of the lipophilic adduct UO_{2}(NO_{3})_{2}(OP(OBu)_{3})_{2}.

=== Archaic photography ===
During the first half of the 19th century, many photosensitive metal salts had been identified as candidates for photographic processes, among them uranyl nitrate. The prints thus produced were called uranium prints or uranotypes. The first uranium printing processes were invented by Scotsman J. Charles Burnett between 1855 and 1857, and used this compound as the sensitive salt. Burnett authored a 1858 article comparing "Printing by the Salts of the Uranic and Ferric Oxides". The process employs the ability of the uranyl ion to pick up two electrons and reduce to the lower oxidation state of uranium(IV) under ultraviolet light. Uranotypes can vary from print to print from a more neutral, brown russet to strong red, with a very long tone grade. Surviving prints are slightly radioactive, a property which serves as a means of non-destructively identifying them.

Several other more elaborate photographic processes employing the compound appeared and vanished during the second half of the 19th century with names like Wothlytype, Mercuro-Uranotype and the Auro-Uranium process. Uranium papers were manufactured commercially at least until the end of the 19th century, vanishing due to the superior sensitivity and practical advantages of silver halides. From the 1930s through the 1950s Kodak Books described a uranium toner (Kodak T-9) using uranium nitrate hexahydrate.

=== Stain for microscopy ===
Along with uranyl acetate it is used as a negative stain for viruses in electron microscopy; in tissue samples it stabilizes nucleic acids and cell membranes.

=== As a reagent ===
Uranyl nitrates are common starting materials for the synthesis of other uranyl compounds because the nitrate ligand is easily replaced by other anions. It reacts with oxalate to give uranyl oxalate. Treatment with hydrochloric acid gives uranyl chloride.

== Health and environmental issues ==
Uranyl nitrate is an oxidizing and highly toxic compound. When ingested, it causes severe chronic kidney disease and acute tubular necrosis and is a lymphocyte mitogen. Target organs include the kidneys, liver, lungs and brain. It also represents a severe fire and explosion risk when heated or subjected to shock in contact with oxidizable substances.
