= Uranium(IV) sulfate =

Identifiers
CAS Number	(anhydrous): 14355-39-6; (tetrahydrate): 13470-23-0
3D model (JSmol)	(anhydrous): Interactive image; (tetrahydrate): Interactive image
ChemSpider	(anhydrous): 15638783
PubChem CID	(anhydrous): 51035180
CompTox Dashboard (EPA)	(anhydrous): DTXSID701349599
- InChI: InChI=1S/2H2O4S.U/c2*1-5(2,3)4;/h2*(H2,1,2,3,4);/q;;+4/p-4 Key: LIXGWHMIWXSAFE-UHFFFAOYSA-J
- SMILES: (anhydrous): [U+4].[O-]S([O-])(=O)=O.[O-]S([O-])(=O)=O; (tetrahydrate): [U+4].[O-]S([O-])(=O)=O.[O-]S([O-])(=O)=O.O.O.O.O

Properties
Chemical formula	U(SO_{4})_{2}
Molar mass	430.15 g/mol
- Except where otherwise noted, data are given for materials in their standard state (at 25 °C [77 °F], 100 kPa). verify (what is ?) Infobox references

Uranium(IV) sulfate (U(SO_{4})_{2}) is a water-soluble salt of uranium. It is a very toxic compound. Uranium sulfate minerals commonly are widespread around uranium bearing mine sites, where they usually form during the evaporation of acid sulfate-rich mine tailings which have been leached by oxygen-bearing waters. Uranium sulfate is a transitional compound in the production of uranium hexafluoride. It was also used to fuel aqueous homogeneous reactors.

== Preparation ==
Uranyl sulfate in solution is readily photochemically reduced to uranium(IV) sulfate. The photoreduction is carried out in the sun and requires the addition of ethanol as a reducing agent. Uranium(IV) crystallizes or is precipitated by ethanol in excess. It can be obtained with different degrees of hydration. U(SO_{4})_{2} can also be prepared through electrochemical reduction of U(VI) and the addition of sulfates. Reduction of U(VI) to U(IV) occurs naturally through a variety of means, including through the actions of microorganisms. Formation of U(SO_{4})_{2} is an entropically and thermodynamically favorable reaction.

== Mining and presence in the environment ==
In-situ leaching (ISL), a widespread technique used to mine uranium, is implicated in the artificial increase of uranium sulfate compounds. ISL was the most widely used method to mine uranium in the United States during the 1990s. The method involves pumping an extraction liquid (either sulfuric acid or an alkaline carbonate solution) into an ore deposit, where it complexes with the uranium, removing the liquid and purifying the uranium. This synthetic addition of sulfuric acid unnaturally raises the abundance of uranium sulfate complexes at the site. The lower pH caused by the introduction of acid increases the solubility of U(IV), which is typically relatively insoluble and precipitates out of solution at neutral pH. Oxidation states for uranium range from U^{3+} to U^{6+}, U(III) and U(V) are rarely found, while U(VI) and U(IV) predominate. U(VI) forms stable aqueous complexes and is thus fairly mobile. Preventing the spread of toxic uranium compounds from mining sites often involves reduction of U(VI) to the far less soluble U(IV). The presence of sulfuric acid and sulfates prevents this sequestration, however, by both lowering the pH and through the formation of uranium salts. U(SO_{4})_{2} is soluble in water, and thus far more mobile. Uranium sulfate complexes also form quite readily.

== Environmental and health effects ==
U(IV) is much less soluble, and thus less environmentally mobile, than U(VI), which also forms sulfate compounds such as UO_{2}(SO_{4}). Bacteria which are able to reduce uranium have been proposed as a means of eliminating U(VI) from contaminated areas, such as mine tailings and nuclear weapons manufacture sites. Contamination of groundwater by uranium is considered a serious health risk, and can be damaging to the environment as well. Several species of sulfate reducing bacteria also have the ability to reduce uranium. The ability to clear the environment of both sulfate (which solubilizes reduced uranium) and mobile U(VI) makes bioremediation of ISL mining sites a possibility.

== Related compounds ==
U(SO_{4})_{2} is a semi-soluble compound and exists in a variety of hydration states, with up to nine coordinating waters. U(IV) can have up to five coordinating sulfates, although nothing above U(SO_{4})_{2} has been significantly described. Kinetics data for U(SO_{4})^{2+} and U(SO_{4})_{2} reveal that the bidentate complex is strongly favored thermodynamically, with a reported K^{0} of 10.51, as compared to K^{0}=6.58 for the monodentate complex. U(IV) is much more stable as a sulfate compound, particularly as U(SO_{4})_{2}. Běhounekite is a recently (2011) described U(IV) mineral with the chemical composition U(SO_{4})_{2} (H_{2}O)_{4}. The uranium center has eight oxygen ligands, four provided by the sulfate groups and four from the water ligands. U(SO_{4})_{2} (H_{2}O)_{4} forms short, green crystals. Běhounekite is the first naturally occurring U(IV) sulfate to be described.
