= Uranium oxide =

Oxide of the element uranium

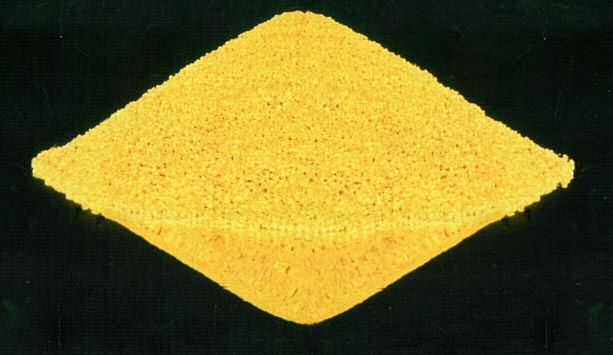
Yellowcake, a mixture of uranium oxides.

Uranium oxide is an oxide of the element uranium. There are many of them.

The metal uranium forms half a dozen known oxides:

- Uranium dioxide or uranium(IV) oxide (UO_{2}, the mineral uraninite or pitchblende)
- Diuranium pentoxide or uranium(V) oxide (U_{2}O_{5})
- Uranium trioxide or uranium(VI) oxide (UO_{3})
- Triuranium octoxide (U_{3}O_{8}, the most stable uranium oxide; yellowcake typically contains 70 to 90 percent triuranium octoxide)
- Uranyl peroxide (UO_{2}O_{2} or UO_{4})
- Amorphous uranium(VI) oxide (Am-U_{2}O_{7})

Uranium dioxide is oxidized in contact with oxygen at high temperature to form triuranium octoxide.

3 UO_{2} + O_{2} → U_{3}O_{8} at 250 °C (523 K)

== Preparation 38 ==
During World War II, "Preparation 38" was the codename for uranium oxide used by German scientists.
