= Amorphous uranyl peroxide =

Amorphous uranium(VI) oxide
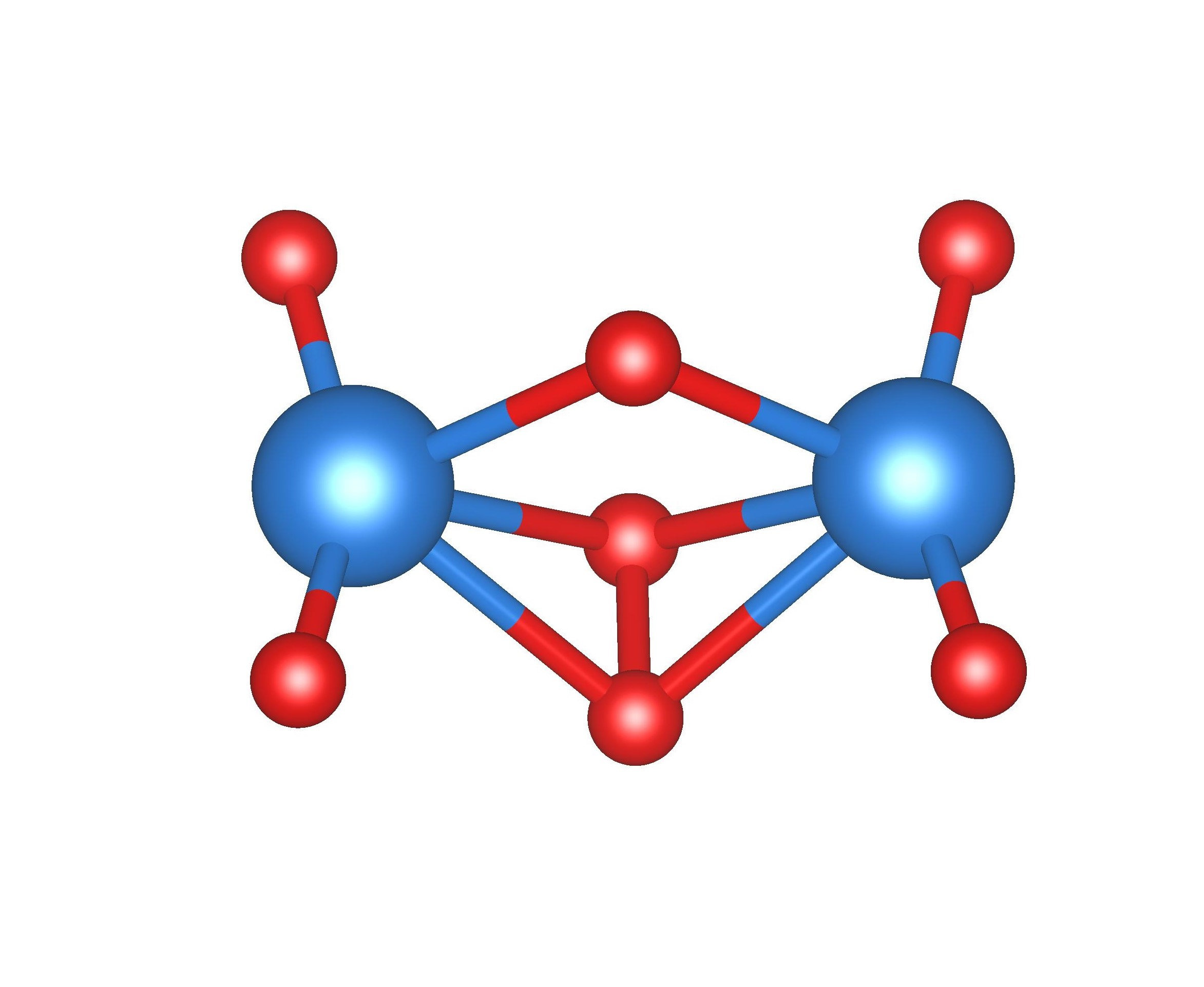

Names
- IUPAC name Diuranyl heptoxide
- Other names Amorphous UO_{3} Amorphous uranyl peroxide

Identifiers
3D model (JSmol)	Interactive image
- InChI: InChI=1S/O2.5O.2U/c1-2;;;;;;;/q-2;;;;;;2*+1 Key: FBOKPNSKWJPMQW-UHFFFAOYSA-N
- SMILES: [O-][O-].O=[U+](=O)O[U+](=O)=O

Properties
Chemical formula	am-U_{2}O_{7}
Molar mass	588 g/mol
Appearance	Orange-brown powder
Density	6.8 g/cm^{3}
Solubility in water	Partially soluble

Related compounds
Related uranium oxides	Uranyl peroxide Triuranium octoxide
- Except where otherwise noted, data are given for materials in their standard state (at 25 °C [77 °F], 100 kPa). Infobox references

Amorphous uranium(VI) oxide (am-U_{2}O_{7}) is an orange diuranyl compound, most commonly obtained from the thermal decomposition of uranyl peroxide tetrahydrate at temperatures between 150 and 500 °C (300 and 930 °F). It exists at room temperature as a powder. Am-U_{2}O_{7} does not comprise a regular, long-range atomic structure, as demonstrated by its characteristic diffuse scattering pattern obtained by X-ray diffraction. As a result, the molecular structure of this material is little understood, although experimental and computational attempts to elucidate a local atomic environment have yielded some success.

== Production ==
Am-U_{2}O_{7} is produced by the thermal decomposition of uranyl peroxide tetrahydrate at temperatures between 150 and 500 °C (300 and 930 °F), in either an air or nitrogen atmosphere. The resultant powder is tan orange in color. Further heating results in the formation of alpha uranium trioxide (α-UO_{3}).

== Structure and reactivity ==
Because of the amorphous nature of am-U_{2}O_{7}, the long-range atomic structure of this compound has not been determined. However, recent computational investigations, chiefly accomplished using density functional theory (DFT), have helped to predict a local structure. Resembling a regular uranate compound, two uranyl (UO^{2+}_{2}) groups are bridged by a μ_{2}-O atom, where both uranium atoms are bonded to an O-O peroxo unit. In this case, a tetrameric ring would be the most stable conformation of the compound. The presence of a peroxide bond in species obtained in this temperature range is unusual; uranyl peroxide has previously been considered to be the only peroxide bearing uranium compound. Developments on this structure propose a two-site metastudtite and UO_{3}-like bonding environment, including the bond types already mentioned. Few other suggestions for the local atomic structure of am-U_{2}O_{7} have been made. However, a crystalline form of U_{2}O_{7}, calculated as a two-site 6 and 8-coordinate structure, has been reported. In the same study, it was again found that the U_{2}O_{7} species contained peroxide bonding. Am-U_{2}O_{7} is known to undergo hydrolysis in the presence of water, to produce a crystalline metaschoepite powder. In addition to a change in crystallinity, this reaction involves a change in color from orange to bright yellow.
