= Uranyl bromide =

Names
- Other names: Uranium(VI) bromide oxide; Uranium dibromide dioxide

Identifiers
3D model (JSmol)	Interactive image
- InChI: InChI=1S/2BrH.2O.U/h2*1H;;;/q;;;;+2/p-2 Key: CBJYXTDZUDNBDB-UHFFFAOYSA-L
- SMILES: O=[U](Br)(Br)=O

Properties
Chemical formula	UO_{2}Br_{2}
Molar mass	429.835 g·mol^{−1}
Appearance	red solid
Solubility in water	soluble

Related compounds
Other anions	Uranyl chloride; Uranyl fluoride; Uranyl iodide
Other cations	Plutonyl fluoride; Neptunyl fluoride
- Except where otherwise noted, data are given for materials in their standard state (at 25 °C [77 °F], 100 kPa). Infobox references

Uranyl bromide is a salt of uranium, oxygen, and bromine with the chemical formula UO_{2}Br_{2}.

== Synthesis ==
Uranyl bromide can be obtained by passing bromine vapor over a heated mixture of UO_{2} and charcoal. The formed compound is extracted with ether.

== Physical properties ==
The compound is highly soluble and hygroscopic, forming intensely red solutions in water. Uranyl bromide is known to form complex compounds with oxygen-containing ligands and can undergo reduction to a black powder upon heating in such solutions.
