= UF3 =

UF3 or UF-3 may refer to:

- Uranium trifluoride, a low-valency uranium fluoride
- French submarine Astrée (Q200), a French submarine which was captured by Nazi Germany and renamed "UF-3"
