= Uranyl iodide =

Names
- Other names: Uranium(VI) iodide oxide; Uranium diiodide dioxide

Identifiers
CAS Number	13520-82-6
3D model (JSmol)	Interactive image
ChemSpider	24593594
- InChI: InChI=1S/2HI.2O.U/h2*1H;;;/q;;;;+2/p-2 Key: REGOIDKCYACLEE-UHFFFAOYSA-L
- SMILES: O=[U](I)(I)=O

Properties
Chemical formula	UO_{2}I_{2}
Molar mass	523.836 g·mol^{−1}
Appearance	red crystals

Related compounds
Other anions	Uranyl bromide; Uranyl chloride; Uranyl fluoride
- Except where otherwise noted, data are given for materials in their standard state (at 25 °C [77 °F], 100 kPa). Infobox references

Uranyl iodide is an compound of uranium, oxygen, and iodine with the chemical formula UO_{2}I_{2}.

== Synthesis ==
Uranyl iodide can be obtained by treating UO_{2}(OTf)_{2} with pure Me_{3}SiI,reducing uranyl iodate with aqueous sulfur dioxide, the decomposition of uranyl sulfate with barium or calcium iodide, or adding barium iodide in excess to an ether solution of uranyl nitrate.

== Chemical properties ==
The compound reacts with water and oxygen to produce uranyl hydroxide:

UO_{2}I_{2} + H_{2}O + 1/_{2}O_{2} → UO_{2}(OH)_{2} + I_{2}
