= Plutonyl fluoride =

Names
- Other names: Plutonium(VI) fluoride oxide; Plutonium difluoride dioxide

Identifiers
3D model (JSmol)	Interactive image
- InChI: InChI=1S/2FH.2O.Pu/h2*1H;;;/q;;;;+2/p-2 Key: PVSQPQKZRBJAQF-UHFFFAOYSA-L
- SMILES: O=[Pu](F)(F)=O

Properties
Chemical formula	PuO_{2}F_{2}
Molar mass	314 g·mol^{−1}
Solubility in water	soluble

Related compounds
Other anions	Plutonyl chloride; Uranyl chloride
Other cations	Neptunyl fluoride; Uranyl fluoride
- Except where otherwise noted, data are given for materials in their standard state (at 25 °C [77 °F], 100 kPa). Infobox references

Plutonyl fluoride is an inorganic compound of plutonium, oxygen, and fluorine with the chemical formula PuO_{2}F_{2}. It was initially isolated by Alenchikova et al. in 1961.

== Synthesis ==
Plutonyl fluoride can be obtained by slowly hydrolysing PuF_{6}.

PuF_{6} (g) + 2 H_{2}O (g) → PuO_{2}F_{2} (s) + 4 HF (g)

== Physical properties ==
Plutonyl fluoride is soluble in water; the solutions have a pink-to-rose color.

== Chemical properties ==
In hydrofluoric acid solution, PuO_{2}F_{2} forms a hydrate, PuO_{2}F_{2}·H_{2}O, and a solid incorporating HF, PuO_{2}F_{2}·HF·4H_{2}O.
