= Plutonyl chloride =

Names
- Other names: Plutonium(VI) chloride oxide; Plutonium dichloride dioxide

Identifiers
3D model (JSmol)	Interactive image; hexahydrate: Interactive image
- InChI: InChI=1S/2ClH.2O.Pu/h2*1H;;;/q;;;;+2/p-2 Key: FBPQBFGMDMYLDF-UHFFFAOYSA-L; hexahydrate: InChI=1S/2ClH.6H2O.2O.Pu/h2*1H;6*1H2;;;/q;;;;;;;;;;+2/p-2 Key: GLHHUAGFMJUIQX-UHFFFAOYSA-L
- SMILES: O=[Pu](Cl)(Cl)=O; hexahydrate: O.O.O.O.O.O.O=[Pu](Cl)(Cl)=O

Properties
Chemical formula	PuO_{2}Cl_{2}
Molar mass	347 g·mol^{−1}
Solubility in water	soluble

Related compounds
Other anions	Plutonyl fluoride
Other cations	Neptunyl chloride; Uranyl chloride
- Except where otherwise noted, data are given for materials in their standard state (at 25 °C [77 °F], 100 kPa). Infobox references

Plutonyl chloride is an compound of plutonium, oxygen, and chlorine with the chemical formula PuO_{2}Cl_{2}. It is an inorganic compound featuring one plutonium atom in the +6 oxidation state, along with two oxygen atoms and two chlorine atoms. It was initially isolated by Alenchikova et al. in 1959.

== Synthesis ==
The plutonyl chloride solution can be prepared by oxidizing tetravalent plutonium chloride with chlorine. The plutonyl chloride is then isolated by evaporation of the solution in vacuum at room temperature.

== Physical properties ==
Plutonyl chloride is soluble in water. It is known as the hexahydrate PuO_{2}Cl_{2}·6H_{2}O, an unstable solid which decomposes to a plutonium(IV) compound over time via alpha radiation from the plutonium.

== Uses ==
Plutonyl chloride and its complexes are important in the context of nuclear fuel reprocessing.
