= Uranyl fluoride =

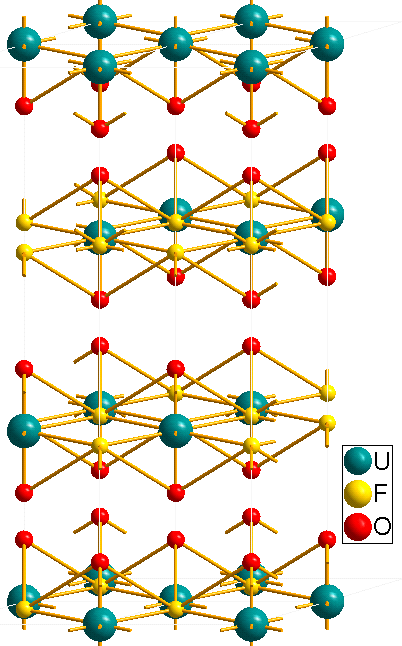
- Uranyl fluoride

Names
- IUPAC name Uranium(VI) difluoride dioxide
- Other names: Difluorodioxouranium; Uranium oxyfluoride; Uranyl difluoride

Identifiers
CAS Number	13536-84-0
3D model (JSmol)	Interactive image
ChemSpider	4937337
ECHA InfoCard	100.033.529
EC Number	236-898-8
PubChem CID	6432077
CompTox Dashboard (EPA)	DTXSID9065528
- InChI: InChI=1S/2FH.2O.U/h2*1H;;;/q;;;;+2/p-2 Key: KCKICANVXIVOLK-UHFFFAOYSA-L
- SMILES: O=[U+2]=O.[F-].[F-]

Properties
Chemical formula	UO_{2}F_{2}
Molar mass	308.024 g·mol^{−1}
Appearance	yellow solid
Density	6.37 g/cm^{3}
Solubility in water	very soluble

Hazards
- GHS labelling
Pictograms	(GHS06: Toxic) (GHS08: Health hazard) (GHS09: Environmental hazard)
Signal word	Danger
Hazard statements	H300, H330, H373, H411

Related compounds
Related compounds	Uranyl bromide; Uranyl chloride; Uranyl iodide; Neptunyl fluoride; Plutonyl fluoride; Plutonyl chloride
- Except where otherwise noted, data are given for materials in their standard state (at 25 °C [77 °F], 100 kPa). verify (what is ?) Infobox references

Uranyl fluoride is the inorganic compound with the formula UO_{2}F_{2}. It is most notable as a contaminant in the production of uranium tetrafluoride.

As shown by X-ray crystallography, the uranyl centers UO^{2+}_{2} are surrounded by six fluoride ligands F^{−}.

== Synthesis ==
It is formed in the hydrolysis of uranium hexafluoride (UF_{6}):

UF_{6} + 2 H_{2}O → UO_{2}F_{2} + 4 HF

It can also be formed in the hydrofluorination of uranium trioxide (UO_{3}):

UO_{3} + 2 HF → UO_{2}F_{2} + H_{2}O

== Physical properties ==
This salt is very soluble in water as well as hygroscopic. It changes in color from brilliant orange to yellow upon hydration. Starting around 300 °C, hydrolysis by the water vapor in air becomes significant, resulting in HF fumes.
