= Uranium trifluoride =

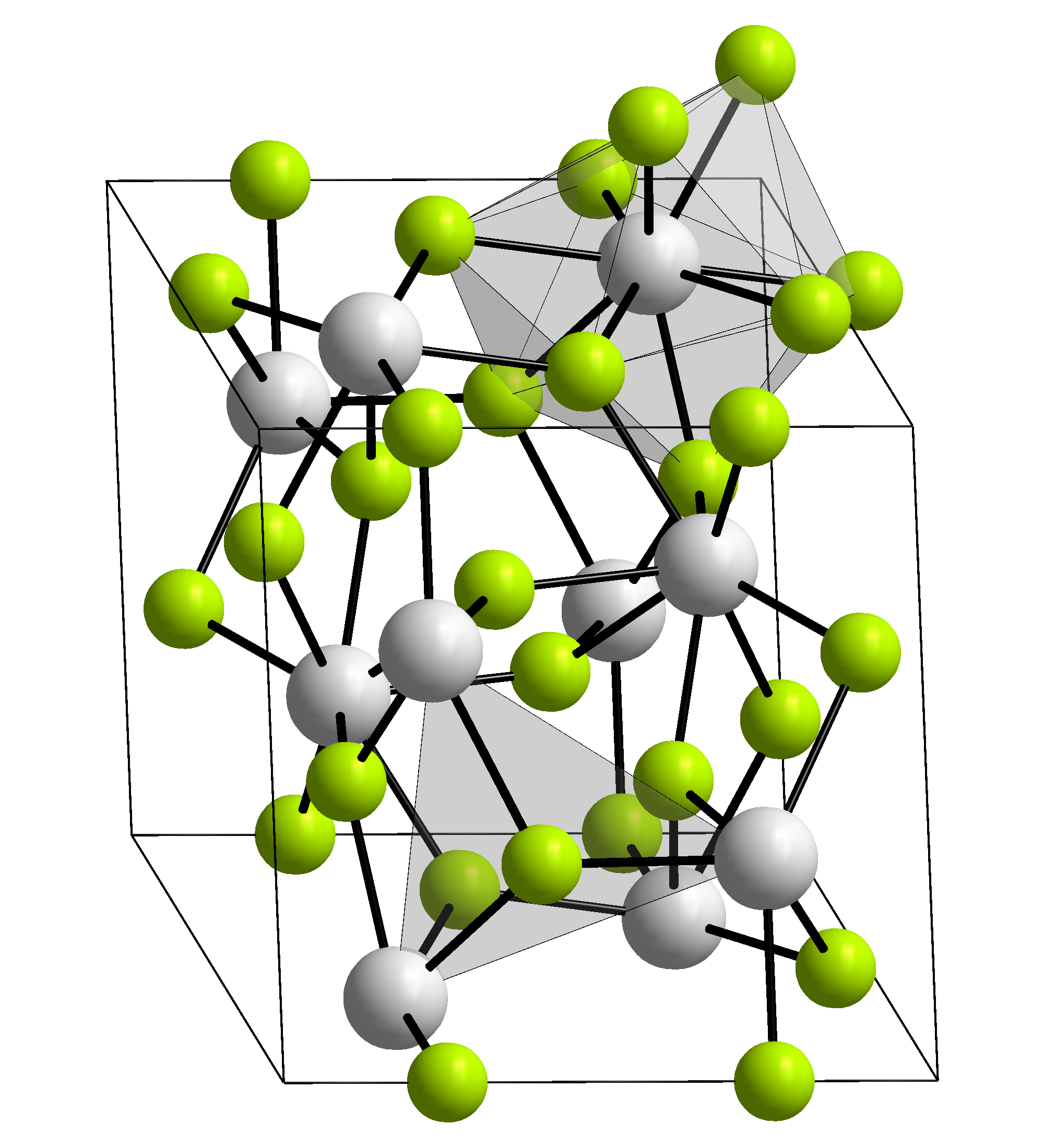

Names
- Other names Trifluorouranium

Identifiers
CAS Number	13775-06-9
3D model (JSmol)	Interactive image
ChemSpider	75544
ECHA InfoCard	100.033.990
PubChem CID	83722
CompTox Dashboard (EPA)	DTXSID2065624
- InChI: InChI=1S/3FH.U/h3*1H;/q;;;+3/p-3
- SMILES: F[U](F)F

Properties
Chemical formula	UF_{3}
Molar mass	295.024 g/mol
Appearance	purple solid
Density	8.9 g/cm^{3}
Melting point	1,495 °C (2,723 °F; 1,768 K)

Structure
Crystal structure	Rhombohedral, hP24
Space group	P6_{3}cm, No. 185
Lattice constant	a = 0.7181 nm, c = 0.7348 nm
Lattice volume (V)	0.32815
Formula units (Z)	6
- Except where otherwise noted, data are given for materials in their standard state (at 25 °C [77 °F], 100 kPa). Infobox references

Uranium trifluoride is an inorganic chemical compound with the chemical formula UF_{3}.

== Synthesis ==
Uranium trifluoride can be obtained by reacting uranium(IV) fluoride with aluminium at 900 °C or with uranium:

$$\mathrm{UF_4 + Al  \longrightarrow UF_3 + AlF}$$
$$\mathrm{3 \ UF_4 + U  \longrightarrow 4 \ UF_3}$$
