= Uranium =

Uranium, _{92}U
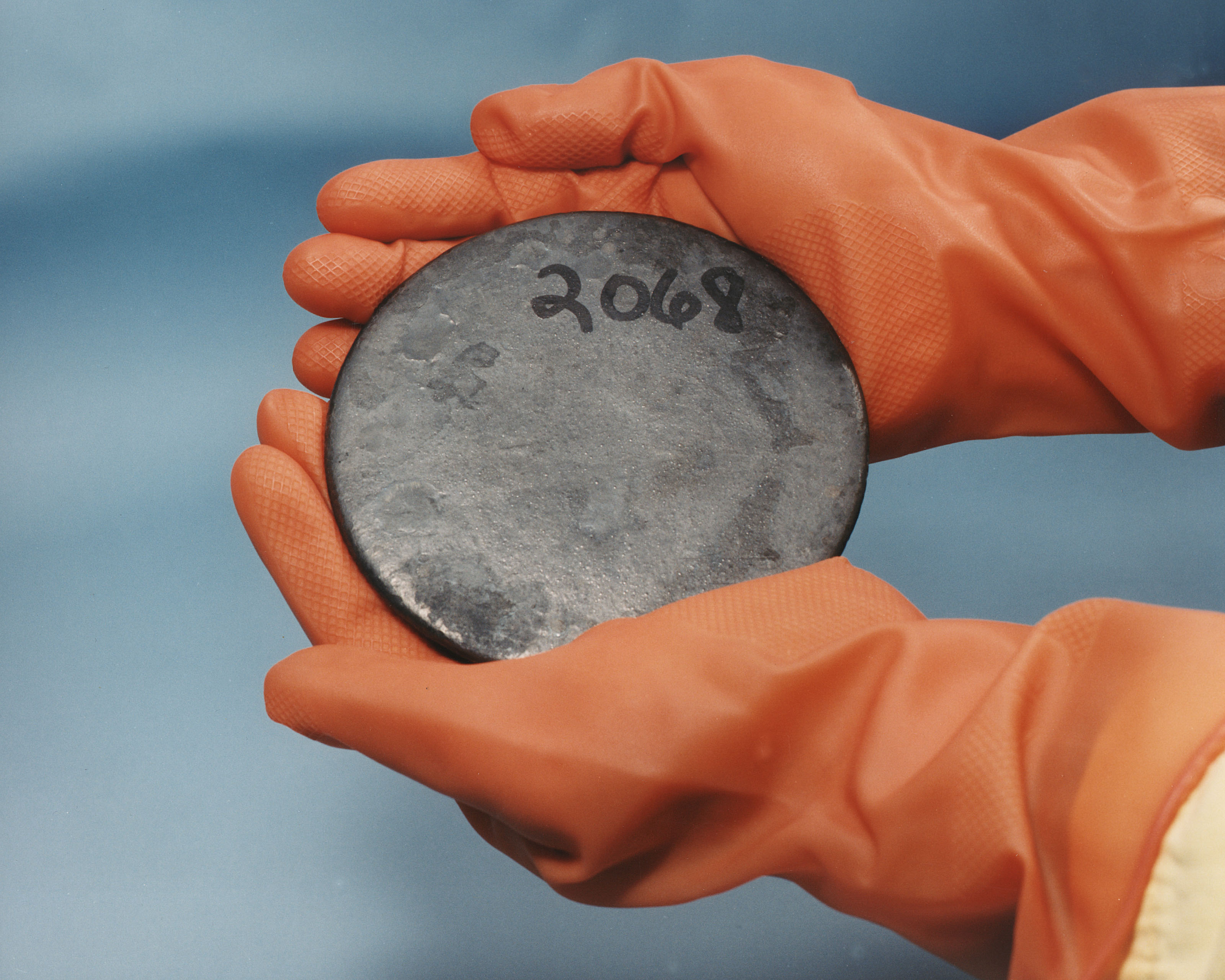

Uranium
- Pronunciation: /jʊˈreɪniəm/ (yuu-RAY-nee-əm)
- Appearance: silvery gray metallic; corrodes to a spalling black oxide coat in air

Standard atomic weight A_{r}°(U)
- 238.02891±0.00003; 238.03±0.01 (abridged)

Uranium in the periodic table
Hydrogen																															Helium
Lithium	Beryllium																									Boron	Carbon	Nitrogen	Oxygen	Fluorine	Neon
Sodium	Magnesium																									Aluminium	Silicon	Phosphorus	Sulfur	Chlorine	Argon
Potassium	Calcium															Scandium	Titanium	Vanadium	Chromium	Manganese	Iron	Cobalt	Nickel	Copper	Zinc	Gallium	Germanium	Arsenic	Selenium	Bromine	Krypton
Rubidium	Strontium															Yttrium	Zirconium	Niobium	Molybdenum	Technetium	Ruthenium	Rhodium	Palladium	Silver	Cadmium	Indium	Tin	Antimony	Tellurium	Iodine	Xenon
Caesium	Barium	Lanthanum	Cerium	Praseodymium	Neodymium	Promethium	Samarium	Europium	Gadolinium	Terbium	Dysprosium	Holmium	Erbium	Thulium	Ytterbium	Lutetium	Hafnium	Tantalum	Tungsten	Rhenium	Osmium	Iridium	Platinum	Gold	Mercury (element)	Thallium	Lead	Bismuth	Polonium	Astatine	Radon
Francium	Radium	Actinium	Thorium	Protactinium	Uranium	Neptunium	Plutonium	Americium	Curium	Berkelium	Californium	Einsteinium	Fermium	Mendelevium	Nobelium	Lawrencium	Rutherfordium	Dubnium	Seaborgium	Bohrium	Hassium	Meitnerium	Darmstadtium	Roentgenium	Copernicium	Nihonium	Flerovium	Moscovium	Livermorium	Tennessine	Oganesson
Nd
↑
U
↓
(Ubq)
protactinium ← uranium → neptunium
- Atomic number (Z): 92
- Group: f-block groups (no number)
- Period: period 7
- Block: f-block
- Electron configuration: [Rn] 5f^{3} 6d^{1} 7s^{2}
- Electrons per shell: 2, 8, 18, 32, 21, 9, 2

Physical properties
- Phase at STP: solid
- Melting point: 1405.3 K (1132.2 °C, 2070 °F)
- Boiling point: 4404 K (4131 °C, 7468 °F)
- Density (at 20° C): 19.050 g/cm^{3}
- when liquid (at m.p.): 17.3 g/cm^{3}
- Heat of fusion: 9.14 kJ/mol
- Heat of vaporization: 417.1 kJ/mol
- Molar heat capacity: 27.665 J/(mol·K)
- Specific heat capacity: 116.225 J/(kg·K)
Vapor pressure
P (Pa)	1	10	100	1 k	10 k	100 k
at T (K)	2325	2564	2859	3234	3727	4402

Atomic properties
- Oxidation states: common: +6 −1, +1, +2, +3, +4, +5
- Electronegativity: Pauling scale: 1.38
- Ionization energies: 1st: 597.6 kJ/mol; 2nd: 1420 kJ/mol
- Atomic radius: empirical: 156 pm
- Covalent radius: 196±7 pm
- Van der Waals radius: 186 pm
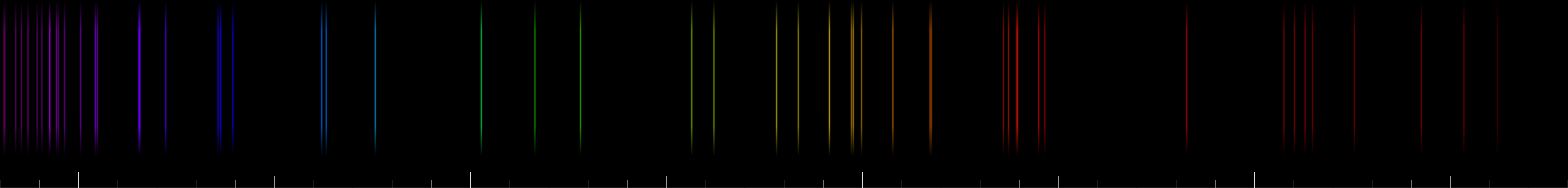
- Spectral lines of uranium

Other properties
- Natural occurrence: primordial
- Crystal structure: orthorhombic (oS4)
- Lattice constants: a = 285.35 pm b = 586.97 pm c = 495.52 pm (at 20 °C)
- Thermal expansion: 15.46×10^{−6}/K (at 20 °C) (Note: The thermal expansion is anisotropic: the coefficients for each crystal axis (at 20 °C) are α_{a} = 25.27×10^{−6}/K, α_{b} = 0.76×10^{−6}/K, α_{c} = 20.35×10^{−6}/K, and α_{average} = α_{volume}/3 = 15.46×10^{−6}/K.)
- Thermal conductivity: 27.5 W/(m⋅K)
- Electrical resistivity: 0.280 µΩ⋅m (at 0 °C)
- Magnetic ordering: paramagnetic
- Young's modulus: 208 GPa
- Shear modulus: 111 GPa
- Bulk modulus: 100 GPa
- Speed of sound thin rod: 3155 m/s (at 20 °C)
- Poisson ratio: 0.23
- Vickers hardness: 1960–2500 MPa
- Brinell hardness: 2350–3850 MPa
- CAS Number: 7440-61-1

History
- Naming: after planet Uranus, itself named after Greek god of the sky Uranus
- Discovery: Martin Heinrich Klaproth (1789)
- First isolation: Eugène-Melchior Péligot (1841)

Isotopes of uranium
Main isotopes			Decay	
Isotope	abundance	half-life (t_{1/2})	mode	product
^{232}U	synth	68.9 y	α	^{228}Th
^{232}U	synth	68.9 y	SF	–
^{233}U	(unstable)	1.592×10^{5} y	α	^{229}Th
^{233}U	(unstable)	1.592×10^{5} y	SF	–
^{234}U	0.005%	2.455×10^{5} y	α	^{230}Th
^{234}U	0.005%	2.455×10^{5} y	SF	–
^{235}U	0.720%	7.04×10^{8} y	α	^{231}Th
^{235}U	0.720%	7.04×10^{8} y	SF	–
^{236}U	(unstable)	2.342×10^{7} y	α	^{232}Th
^{236}U	(unstable)	2.342×10^{7} y	SF	–
^{238}U	99.274%	4.463×10^{9} y	α	^{234}Th
^{238}U	99.274%	4.463×10^{9} y	SF	–
^{238}U	99.274%	4.463×10^{9} y	β^{−}β^{−}	^{238}Pu

Uranium is a chemical element; it has symbol U and atomic number 92. It is a silvery-grey metal in the actinide series of the periodic table. A uranium atom has 92 protons and 92 electrons, of which 6 are valence electrons. Uranium radioactively decays, usually by emitting an alpha particle. The half-life of this decay varies between 159,200 and 4.5 billion years for different isotopes, making them useful for dating the age of the Earth. The most common isotopes in natural uranium are uranium-238 (which has 146 neutrons and accounts for over 99% of uranium on Earth) and uranium-235 (which has 143 neutrons). Uranium has the highest atomic weight of the primordially occurring elements. Its density is about 70% higher than that of lead and slightly lower than that of gold or tungsten. It occurs naturally in low concentrations of a few parts per million in soil, rock and water, and is commercially extracted from uranium-bearing minerals such as uraninite.

Many contemporary uses of uranium exploit its unique nuclear properties. Uranium is used in nuclear power plants and nuclear weapons because it is the only naturally occurring element with a fissile isotope – uranium-235 – present in non-trace amounts. However, because of the low abundance of uranium-235 in natural uranium (which is overwhelmingly uranium-238), uranium needs to undergo enrichment so that enough uranium-235 is present. Uranium-238 is fissionable by fast neutrons and is fertile, meaning it can be transmuted to fissile plutonium-239 in a nuclear reactor. Another fissile isotope, uranium-233, can be produced from natural thorium and is studied for future industrial use in nuclear technology. Uranium-238 has a small probability for spontaneous fission or even induced fission with fast neutrons; uranium-235, and to a lesser degree uranium-233, have a much higher fission cross-section for slow neutrons. In sufficient concentration, these isotopes maintain a sustained nuclear chain reaction. This generates the heat in nuclear power reactors and produces the fissile material for nuclear weapons. The primary civilian use for uranium harnesses the heat energy to produce electricity. Depleted uranium (^{238}U) is used in kinetic energy penetrators and armor plating.

The 1789 discovery of uranium in the mineral pitchblende is credited to Martin Heinrich Klaproth, who named the new element after the recently discovered planet Uranus. Eugène-Melchior Péligot was the first person to isolate the metal, and its radioactive properties were discovered in 1896 by Henri Becquerel. Research by Otto Hahn, Lise Meitner, Enrico Fermi and others (including J. Robert Oppenheimer), beginning in 1934, led to its use as a fuel in the nuclear power industry and in Little Boy, the first nuclear weapon used in war. An ensuing arms race during the Cold War between the United States and the Soviet Union produced tens of thousands of nuclear weapons that used uranium metal and uranium-derived plutonium-239. Dismantling of these weapons and related nuclear facilities is carried out within various nuclear disarmament programs and costs billions of dollars. Weapon-grade uranium obtained from nuclear weapons is diluted with uranium-238 and reused as fuel for nuclear reactors. Spent nuclear fuel forms radioactive waste, which mostly consists of uranium-238 and poses a significant threat to health and to the environment.

== Characteristics ==
A neutron-induced nuclear fission event involving uranium-235

Uranium is a silvery white, weakly radioactive metal. It has a Mohs hardness of 6, sufficient to scratch glass and roughly equal to that of titanium, rhodium, manganese and niobium. It is malleable, ductile, slightly paramagnetic, strongly electropositive and a poor electrical conductor. Uranium metal has a very high density of 19.1 g/cm^{3}, denser than lead (11.3 g/cm^{3}), but slightly less dense than tungsten and gold (19.3 g/cm^{3}).

Uranium metal reacts with almost all non-metallic elements (except noble gases) and their compounds, its reactivity increasing with temperature. Hydrochloric and nitric acids dissolve uranium, but non-oxidizing acids other than hydrochloric acid attack the element very slowly. When finely divided, it can react with cold water; in air, uranium metal becomes coated with a dark layer of uranium dioxide. Uranium in ores is extracted chemically and converted into uranium dioxide or other chemical forms usable in industry.

In 1938, Otto Hahn and Fritz Strassman discovered that barium was a product of bombarding uranium-235 with neutrons, and a year later Lise Meitner and Otto Robert Frisch developed the theory of nuclear fission to explain this new phenomenon, making U-235 the first fissile isotope to be discovered. On bombardment with slow neutrons, uranium-235 most of the time splits into two smaller nuclei, releasing nuclear binding energy and more neutrons. If too many of these neutrons are absorbed by other uranium-235 nuclei, a nuclear chain reaction occurs that results in a burst of heat or (in some circumstances) an explosion. In a nuclear reactor, such a chain reaction is slowed and controlled by a neutron poison, absorbing some of the free neutrons. Such neutron-absorbent materials are often part of reactor control rods (see nuclear reactor physics for a description of this process of reactor control). Other naturally occurring isotopes such as uranium-238 are fissionable, but not fissile, meaning that they only undergo fission when absorbing high energy (fast) neutrons.

As little as 15 lb (6.8 kg) of uranium-235 can be used to make an atomic bomb. The nuclear weapon detonated over Hiroshima, Japan, named Little Boy, relied on uranium fission. However, the first nuclear bomb (the Gadget used at Trinity) and the bomb that was detonated over Nagasaki, Japan (Fat Man), were both plutonium bombs.

Uranium metal has three allotropic forms:

- α (orthorhombic) stable up to 668 °C (1,234 °F). Orthorhombic, space group No. 63, Cmcm, lattice parameters a = 285.4 pm, b = 587 pm, c = 495.5 pm.
- β (tetragonal) stable from 668 to 775 °C (1,234 to 1,427 °F). Tetragonal, space group P4_{2}/mnm, P4_{2}nm, or P4n2, lattice parameters a = 565.6 pm, b = c = 1075.9 pm.
- γ (body-centered cubic) from 775 °C (1,427 °F) to melting point—this is the most malleable and ductile state. Body-centered cubic, lattice parameter a = 352.4 pm.

== Applications ==
=== Military ===
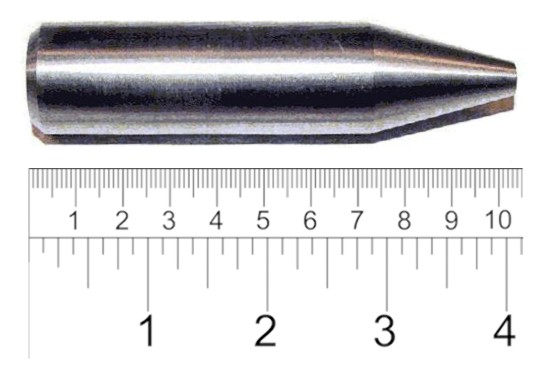
Various militaries use depleted uranium as high-density penetrators.

The major application of uranium in the military sector is in high-density penetrating projectiles. This ammunition consists of depleted uranium (DU) alloyed with 1–2% other elements, such as titanium or molybdenum. At high impact speed, the density, hardness, and pyrophoricity of the projectile enable the destruction of heavily armored targets. Tank armor and other removable vehicle armor can also be hardened with depleted uranium plates. The use of depleted uranium became politically and environmentally contentious after the use of such munitions by the US, UK and other countries during wars in the Persian Gulf and the Balkans raised health questions concerning uranium compounds left in the soil (see Gulf War syndrome).

Depleted uranium is also used as a shielding material in some containers used to store and transport radioactive materials. While the metal itself is radioactive, its high density makes it more effective than lead in halting radiation from strong sources such as radium. Other uses of depleted uranium include counterweights for aircraft control surfaces, as ballast for missile re-entry vehicles and as a shielding material. Due to its high density, this material is found in inertial guidance systems and in gyroscopic compasses. Depleted uranium is preferred over similarly dense metals for its ability to be easily machined and cast, as well as its relatively low cost. The main risk of exposure to depleted uranium is chemical poisoning by uranium oxide rather than radioactivity (uranium being only a weak alpha emitter).

During the later stages of World War II, the entire Cold War, and to a lesser extent afterwards, uranium-235 has been used as the fissile explosive material to produce nuclear weapons. Initially, two major types of fission bombs were built: a relatively simple device that uses uranium-235 and a more complicated mechanism that uses plutonium-239 derived from uranium-238. Later, a much more complicated and far more powerful type of fission/fusion bomb (thermonuclear weapon) was built, that uses a plutonium-based device to cause a mixture of tritium and deuterium to undergo nuclear fusion. Such bombs are jacketed in a non-fissile (unenriched) uranium case, and they derive more than half their power from the fission of this material by fast neutrons from the nuclear fusion process.

=== Civilian ===
The main use of uranium in the civilian sector is to fuel nuclear power plants. One kilogram of uranium-235 can theoretically produce about 20 terajoules of energy (2×10^{13} joules), assuming complete fission; as much energy as 1.5 million kilograms (1,500 metric tonnes) of coal.

Commercial nuclear power plants use fuel that is typically enriched to around 3% uranium-235. The CANDU and Magnox designs are the only commercial reactors capable of using unenriched uranium fuel. Fuel used for United States Navy reactors is typically highly enriched in uranium-235 (the exact values are classified). In a breeder reactor, uranium-238 can also be converted into plutonium-239 through the following reaction:

^{238}_{92}U + n → ^{239}_{92}U + γ ^{239}_{93}Np ^{239}_{94}Pu

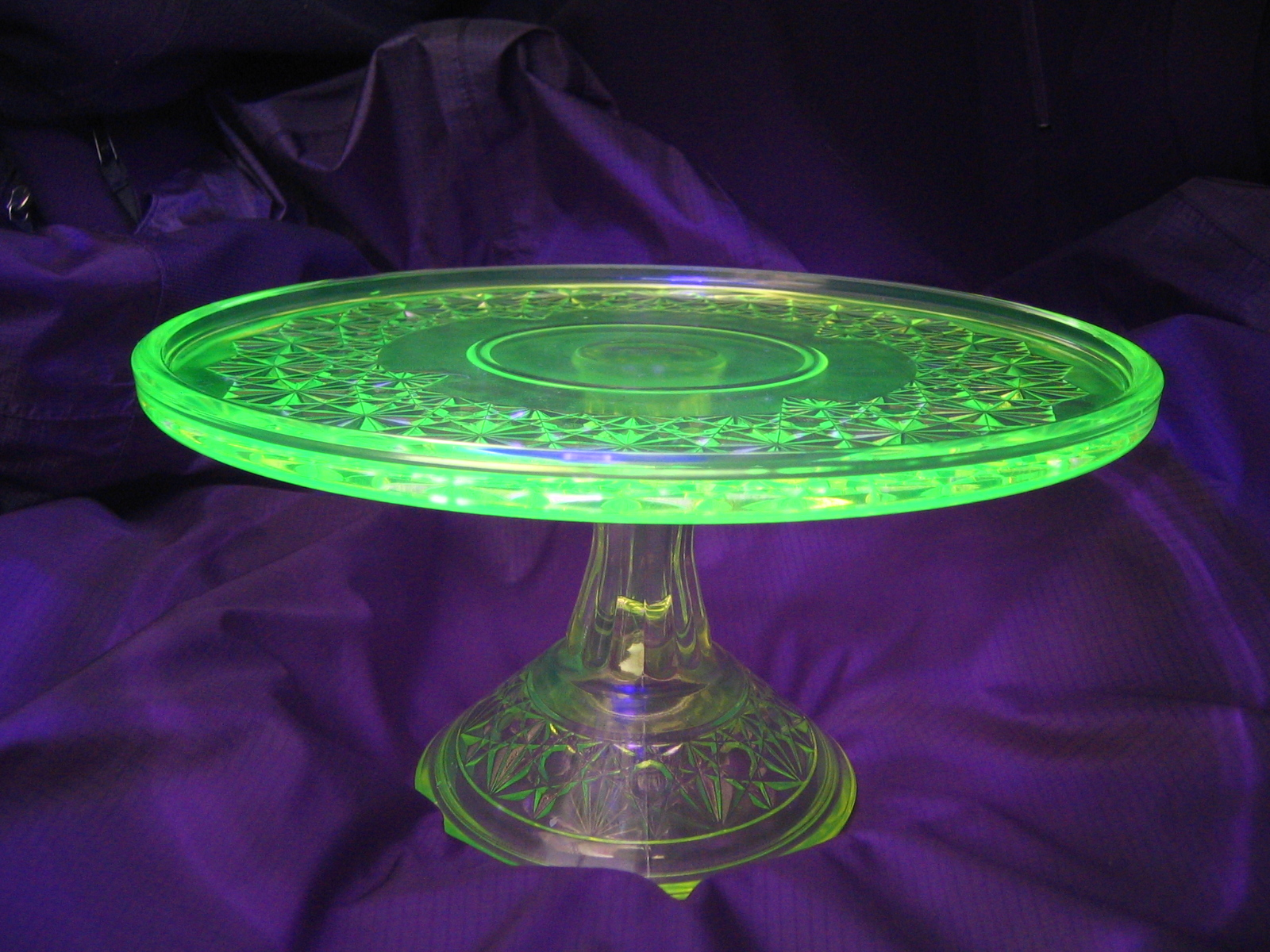
Uranium glass glowing under UV light

Before (and, occasionally, after) the discovery of radioactivity, uranium was primarily used in small amounts for yellow glass and pottery glazes, such as uranium glass and in Fiestaware.

The discovery and isolation of radium in uranium ore (pitchblende) by Marie Curie sparked the development of uranium mining to extract the radium, which was used to make glow-in-the-dark paints for clock and aircraft dials. This left a prodigious quantity of uranium as a waste product, since it takes three tonnes of uranium to extract one gram of radium. This waste product was diverted to the glazing industry, making uranium glazes very inexpensive and abundant. Besides the pottery glazes, uranium tile glazes accounted for the bulk of the use, including common bathroom and kitchen tiles which can be produced in green, yellow, mauve, black, blue, red and other colors.

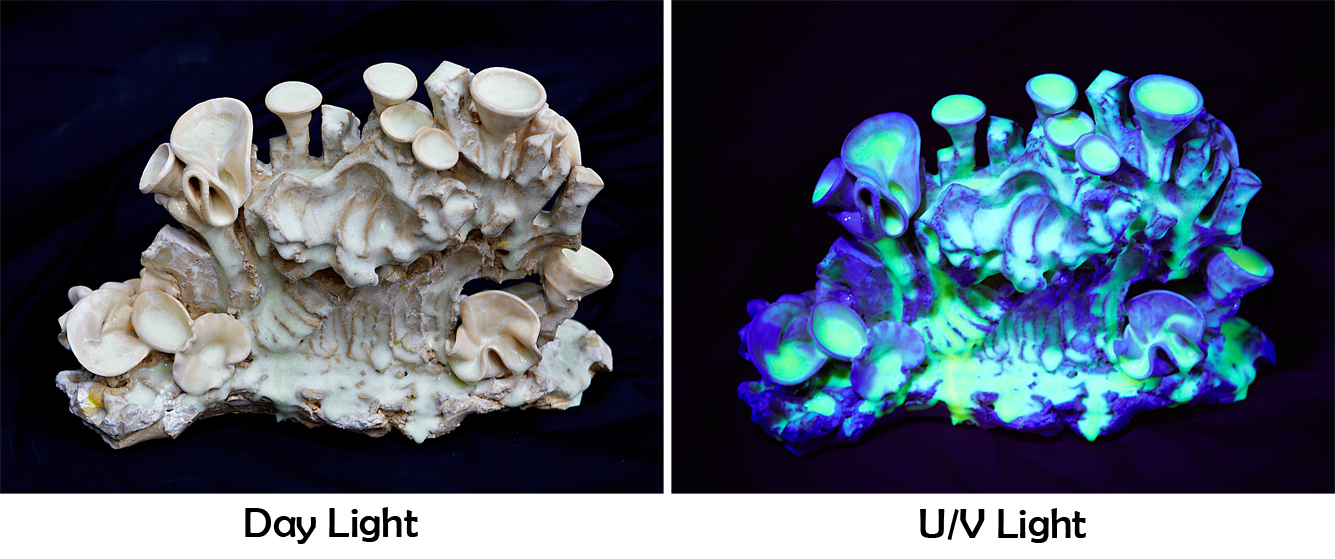
The uranium glaze on a ceramic artwork glowing under UV light.

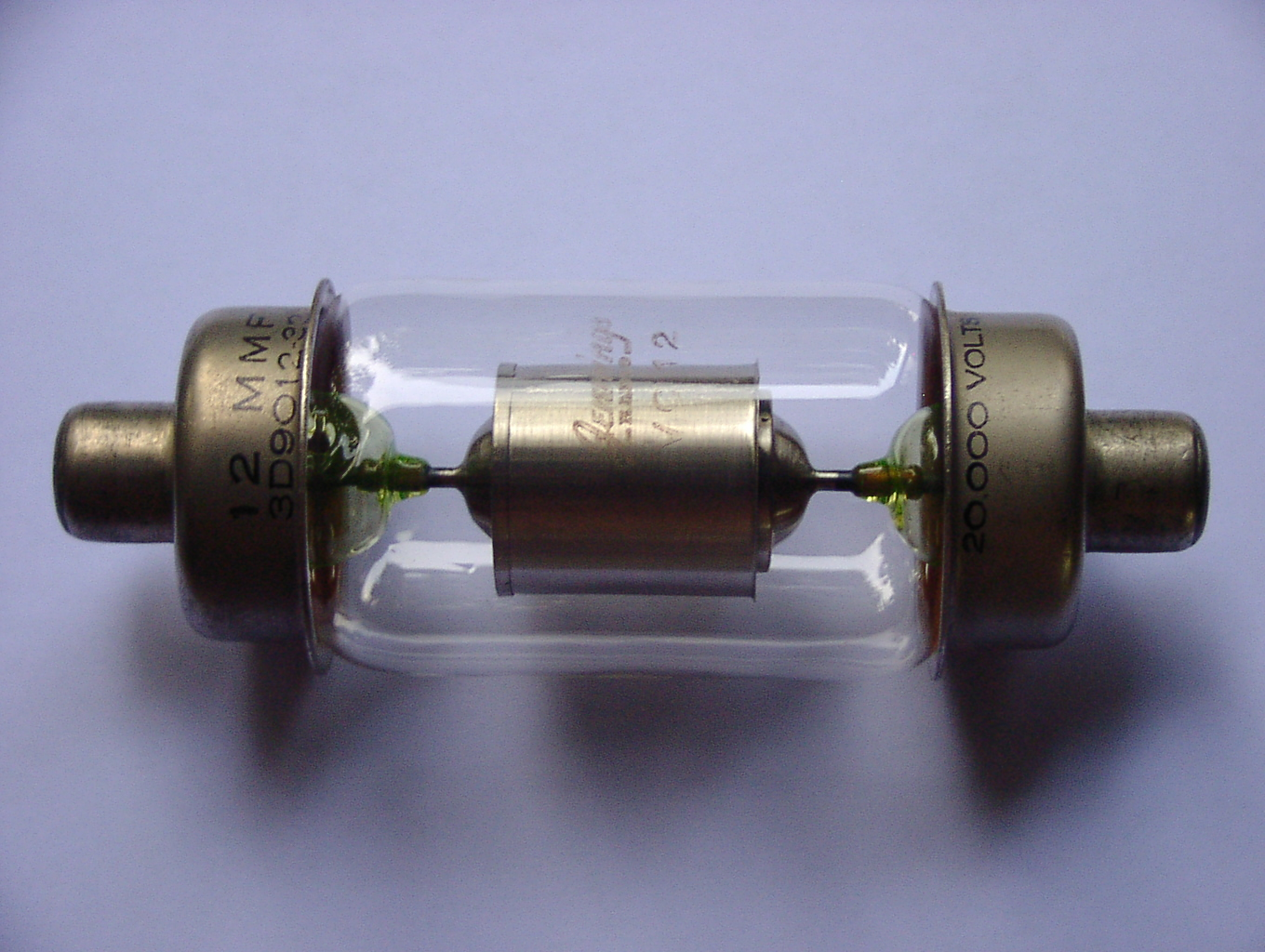
Uranium glass used as lead-in seals in a vacuum capacitor

Uranium was also used in photographic chemicals (especially uranium nitrate as a toner), in lamp filaments for stage lighting bulbs, to improve the appearance of dentures, and in the leather and wood industries for stains and dyes. Uranium salts are mordants of silk or wool. Uranyl acetate and uranyl formate are used as electron-dense "stains" in transmission electron microscopy, to increase the contrast of biological specimens in ultrathin sections and in negative staining of viruses, isolated cell organelles and macromolecules.

The discovery of the radioactivity of uranium ushered in additional scientific and practical uses of the element. The long half-life of uranium-238 (4.47×10^{9} years) makes it well-suited for use in estimating the age of the earliest igneous rocks and for other types of radiometric dating, including uranium–thorium dating, uranium–lead dating and uranium–uranium dating. Uranium metal is used for X-ray targets in the making of high-energy X-rays.

== History ==
=== Pre-discovery use ===
The use of pitchblende, uranium in its natural oxide form, dates back to at least the year 79 AD, when it was used in the Roman Empire to add a yellow color to ceramic glazes. Yellow glass with 1% uranium oxide was found in a Roman villa on Cape Posillipo in the Gulf of Naples, Italy, by R. T. Gunther of the University of Oxford in 1912. Starting in the late Middle Ages, pitchblende was extracted from the Habsburg silver mines in Joachimsthal, Bohemia (now Jáchymov in the Czech Republic) in the Ore Mountains, and was used as a coloring agent in the local glassmaking industry. In the early 19th century, the world's only known sources of uranium ore were these mines.

=== Discovery ===
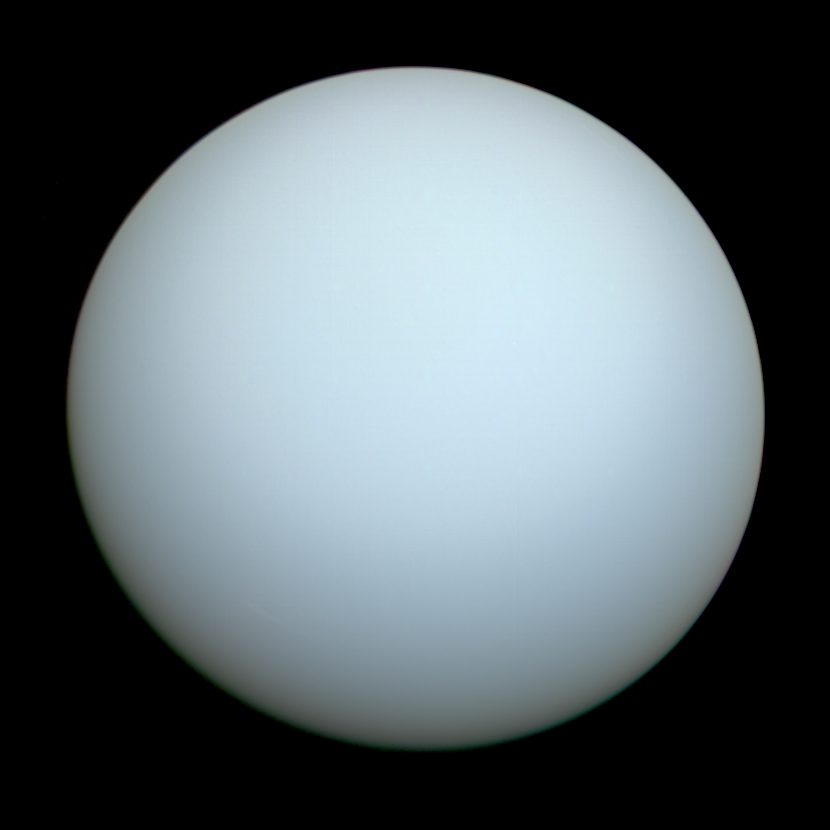
The planet Uranus, which uranium is named after

The discovery of the element is credited to the German chemist Martin Heinrich Klaproth. While he was working in his experimental laboratory in Berlin in 1789, Klaproth was able to precipitate a yellow compound (likely sodium diuranate) by dissolving pitchblende in nitric acid and neutralizing the solution with sodium hydroxide. Klaproth assumed the yellow substance was the oxide of a yet-undiscovered element and heated it with charcoal to obtain a black powder, which he thought was the newly discovered metal itself (in fact, that powder was an oxide of uranium). He named the newly discovered element "Uranit" after the planet Uranus (named after the primordial Greek god of the sky), which had been discovered eight years earlier by William Herschel. He later renamed it "Uranium" to conform to the naming standard.

In 1841, Eugène-Melchior Péligot, Professor of Analytical Chemistry at the Conservatoire National des Arts et Métiers (Central School of Arts and Manufactures) in Paris, isolated the first sample of uranium metal by heating uranium tetrachloride with potassium.

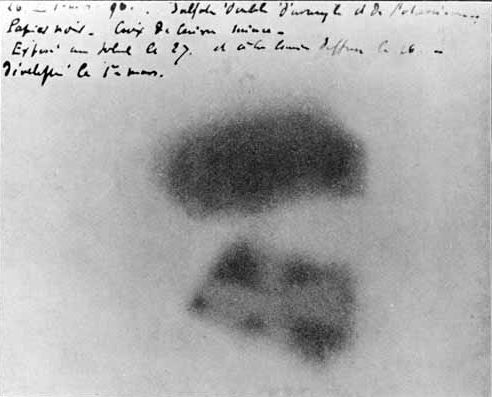
Henri Becquerel discovered radioactivity by exposing a photographic plate to uranium in 1896.

Henri Becquerel discovered radioactivity by using uranium in 1896. Becquerel made the discovery in Paris by leaving a sample of a uranium salt, K_{2}UO_{2}(SO_{4})_{2} (potassium uranyl sulfate), on top of an unexposed photographic plate in a drawer and noting that the plate had become "fogged". He determined that a form of invisible light or rays emitted by uranium had exposed the plate.

During World War I when the Central Powers suffered a shortage of molybdenum to make artillery gun barrels and high speed tool steels, they routinely used ferrouranium alloy as a substitute, as it presents many of the same physical characteristics as molybdenum. When this practice became known in 1916 the US government requested several prominent universities to research the use of uranium in manufacturing and metalwork. Tools made with these formulas remained in use for several decades, until the Manhattan Project and the Cold War placed a large demand on uranium for fission research and weapon development.

=== Fission research ===
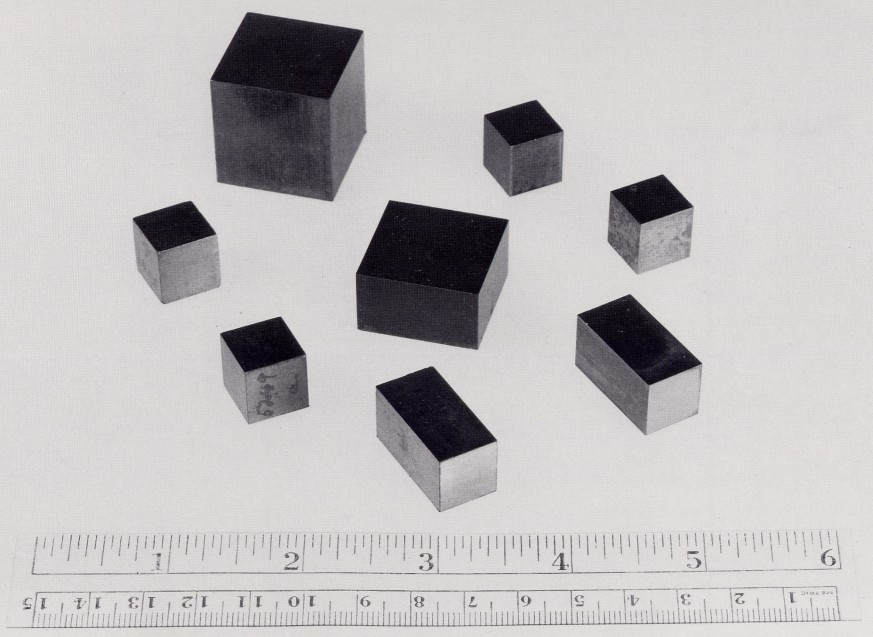
Cuboids of uranium produced during the Manhattan Project

A team led by Enrico Fermi in 1934 found that bombarding uranium with neutrons produces beta rays (electrons or positrons from the elements produced; see beta particle). The fission products were at first mistaken for new elements with atomic numbers 93 and 94, which the Dean of the Sapienza University of Rome, Orso Mario Corbino, named ausenium and hesperium, respectively. The experiments leading to the discovery of uranium's ability to fission (break apart) into lighter elements and release binding energy were conducted by Otto Hahn and Fritz Strassmann in Hahn's laboratory in Berlin. Lise Meitner and her nephew, physicist Otto Robert Frisch, published the physical explanation in February 1939 and named the process "nuclear fission". Soon afterward, Fermi hypothesized that fission of uranium might release enough neutrons to sustain a fission reaction. Confirmation of this hypothesis came in 1939, and later work found that on average about 2.5 neutrons are released by each fission of uranium-235. Fermi urged Alfred O. C. Nier to separate uranium isotopes for determination of the fissile component, and on 29 February 1940, Nier used an instrument he built at the University of Minnesota to separate the world's first uranium-235 sample in the Tate Laboratory. Using Columbia University's cyclotron, John Dunning confirmed the sample to be the isolated fissile material on 1 March. Further work found that the far more common uranium-238 isotope can be transmuted into plutonium, which, like uranium-235, is also fissile by thermal neutrons. These discoveries led numerous countries to begin working on the development of nuclear weapons and nuclear power. Despite fission having been discovered in Germany, the Uranverein ("uranium club") Germany's wartime project to research nuclear power and/or weapons was hampered by limited resources, infighting, the exile or non-involvement of several prominent scientists in the field and several crucial mistakes such as failing to account for impurities in available graphite samples which made it appear less suitable as a neutron moderator than it is in reality. Germany's attempts to build a natural uranium / heavy water reactor had not come close to reaching criticality by the time the Americans reached Haigerloch, the site of the last German wartime reactor experiment.

On 2 December 1942, as part of the Manhattan Project, another team led by Enrico Fermi was able to initiate the first artificial self-sustained nuclear chain reaction, Chicago Pile-1. An initial plan using enriched uranium-235 was abandoned as it was as yet unavailable in sufficient quantities. Working in a lab below the stands of Stagg Field at the University of Chicago, the team created the conditions needed for such a reaction by piling together 360 tonnes of graphite, 53 tonnes of uranium oxide, and 5.5 tonnes of uranium metal, most of which was supplied by Westinghouse Lamp Plant in a makeshift production process.

=== Nuclear weaponry ===
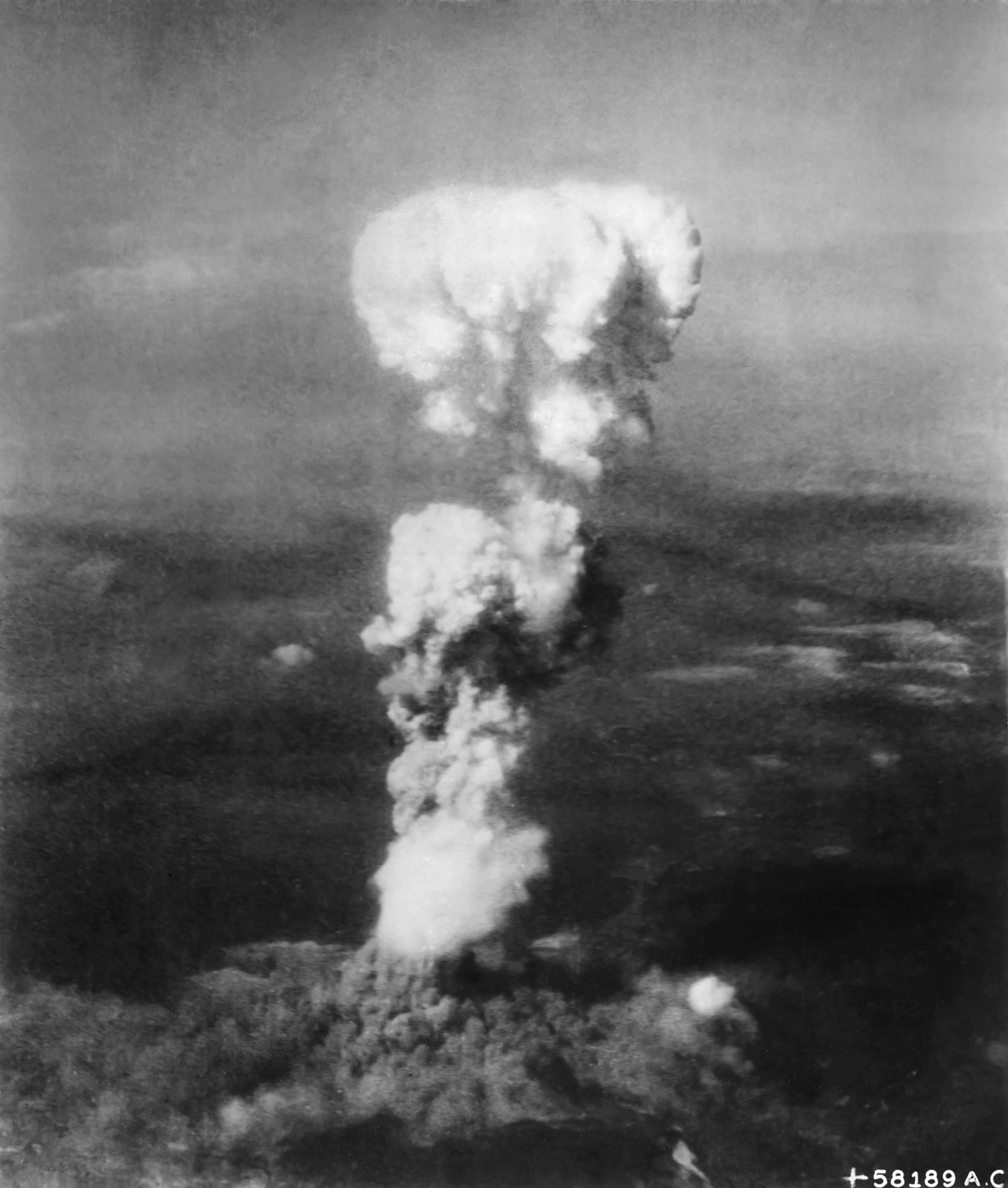
Mushroom cloud over Hiroshima after the dropping of the uranium-fired 'Little Boy'

Two types of atomic bomb were developed by the United States during World War II: a uranium-based device (codenamed "Little Boy") whose fissile material was highly enriched uranium, and a plutonium-based device (see Trinity test and "Fat Man") whose plutonium was derived from uranium-238. Little Boy became the first nuclear weapon used in war when it was detonated over Hiroshima, Japan, on 6 August 1945. Exploding with a yield equivalent to 12,500 tonnes of TNT, the blast and thermal wave of the bomb destroyed nearly 50,000 buildings and killed about 75,000 people (see Atomic bombings of Hiroshima and Nagasaki).

In 1943 the Manhattan Project contracted two private companies, Union Carbide and Chevron, to quietly compile a survey of uranium deposits around the world. As the survey results came in, two geology professors studied the results and suggested general guidelines for new sources, including uranium associated with gold mines in the Rand area in South Africa.

Initially it was believed that uranium was relatively rare, and that nuclear proliferation could be avoided by simply buying up all known uranium stocks, but within a decade large deposits of it were discovered in many places around the world.

=== Reactors ===
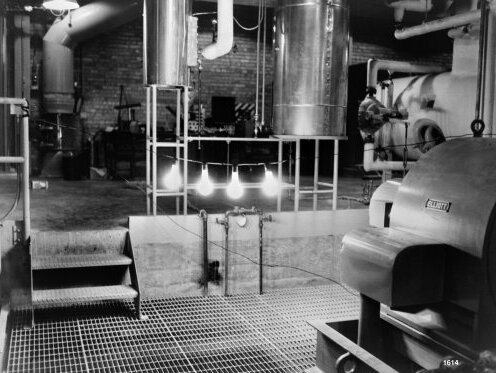
Four light bulbs lit with electricity generated from the first artificial electricity-producing nuclear reactor, EBR-I (1951)

The X-10 Graphite Reactor at Oak Ridge National Laboratory (ORNL) in Oak Ridge, Tennessee, formerly known as the Clinton Pile and X-10 Pile, was the world's second artificial nuclear reactor (after Enrico Fermi's Chicago Pile) and was the first reactor designed and built for continuous operation. Argonne National Laboratory's Experimental Breeder Reactor I, located at the Atomic Energy Commission's National Reactor Testing Station near Arco, Idaho, became the first nuclear reactor to create electricity on 20 December 1951. Initially, four 150-watt light bulbs were lit by the reactor, but improvements eventually enabled it to power the whole facility (later, the town of Arco became the first in the world to have all its electricity come from nuclear power generated by BORAX-III, another reactor designed and operated by Argonne National Laboratory). The world's first commercial scale nuclear power station, Obninsk in the Soviet Union, began generation with its reactor AM-1 on 27 June 1954. Other early nuclear power plants were Calder Hall in England, which began generation on 17 October 1956, and the Shippingport Atomic Power Station in Pennsylvania, which began on 26 May 1958. Nuclear power was used for the first time for propulsion by a submarine, the USS Nautilus, in 1954.

=== Prehistoric naturally occurring fission ===
In 1972, French physicist Francis Perrin discovered fifteen ancient and no longer active natural nuclear fission reactors in three separate ore deposits at the Oklo mine in Gabon, Africa, collectively known as the Oklo Fossil Reactors. The ore deposit is 1.7 billion years old; then, uranium-235 constituted about 3% of uranium on Earth. This is high enough to permit a sustained chain reaction, if other supporting conditions exist. The capacity of the surrounding sediment to contain the health-threatening nuclear waste products has been cited by the U.S. federal government as supporting evidence for the feasibility to store spent nuclear fuel at the Yucca Mountain nuclear waste repository.

=== Contamination and the Cold War legacy ===
U.S. and USSR/Russian nuclear weapons stockpiles, 1945–2005

Above-ground nuclear tests by the Soviet Union and the United States in the 1950s and early 1960s and by France into the 1970s and 1980s spread a significant amount of fallout from uranium daughter isotopes around the world. Additional fallout and pollution occurred from several nuclear accidents.

Uranium miners have a higher incidence of cancer. An excess risk of lung cancer among Navajo uranium miners, for example, has been documented and linked to their occupation. The Radiation Exposure Compensation Act, a 1990 law in the US, required $100,000 in "compassion payments" to uranium miners diagnosed with cancer or other respiratory ailments.

During the Cold War between the Soviet Union and the United States, huge stockpiles of uranium were amassed and tens of thousands of nuclear weapons were created using enriched uranium and plutonium made from uranium. After the break-up of the Soviet Union in 1991, an estimated 600 short tons (540 metric tons) of highly enriched weapons grade uranium (enough to make 40,000 nuclear warheads) had been stored in often inadequately guarded facilities in the Russian Federation and several other former Soviet states. Police in Asia, Europe, and South America on at least 16 occasions from 1993 to 2005 have intercepted shipments of smuggled bomb-grade uranium or plutonium, most of which was from ex-Soviet sources. From 1993 to 2005 the Material Protection, Control, and Accounting Program, operated by the federal government of the United States, spent about US$550 million to help safeguard uranium and plutonium stockpiles in Russia. This money was used for improvements and security enhancements at research and storage facilities.

Safety of nuclear facilities in Russia has been significantly improved since the stabilization of political and economical turmoil of the early 1990s. For example, in 1993 there were 29 incidents ranking above level 1 on the International Nuclear Event Scale, and this number dropped under four per year in 1995–2003. The number of employees receiving annual radiation doses above 20 mSv, which is equivalent to a single full-body CT scan, saw a strong decline around 2000. In November 2015, the Russian government approved a federal program for nuclear and radiation safety for 2016 to 2030 with a budget of 562 billion rubles (ca. 8 billion USD). Its key issue is "the deferred liabilities accumulated during the 70 years of the nuclear industry, particularly during the time of the Soviet Union". About 73% of the budget will be spent on decommissioning aged and obsolete nuclear reactors and nuclear facilities, especially those involved in state defense programs; 20% will go in processing and disposal of nuclear fuel and radioactive waste, and 5% into monitoring and ensuring of nuclear and radiation safety.

== Occurrence ==
Uranium production

Uranium is a naturally occurring element found in low levels in all rock, soil, and water. It is the highest-numbered element found naturally in significant quantities on Earth and is almost always found combined with other elements. Uranium is the 48th most abundant element in the Earth's crust. The decay of uranium, thorium, and potassium-40 in Earth's mantle is thought to be the main source of heat that keeps the Earth's outer core in the liquid state and drives mantle convection, which in turn drives plate tectonics.

Uranium's concentration in the Earth's crust is (depending on the reference) 2 to 4 parts per million, or about 40 times as abundant as silver. The Earth's crust from the surface to 25 km (15 mi) down is calculated to contain 10^{17} kg (2×10^{17} lb) of uranium while the oceans may contain 10^{13} kg (2×10^{13} lb). The concentration of uranium in soil ranges from 0.7 to 11 parts per million (up to 15 parts per million in farmland soil due to use of phosphate fertilizers containing uranium impurities), and its concentration in sea water is 3 parts per billion.

Uranium is more plentiful than antimony, tin, cadmium, mercury, or silver, and it is about as abundant as arsenic or molybdenum. Uranium is found in hundreds of minerals, including:

- uraninite (also called pitchblende, the most common uranium ore), UO_{2} with some U_{3}O_{8}
- carnotite, K_{2}(UO_{2})_{2}(VO_{4})_{2}·3H_{2}O
- autunite, Ca(UO_{2})_{2}(PO_{4})_{2}·10-12H_{2}O
- uranophane, Ca(UO_{2})_{2}(SiO_{3}OH)_{2}·5H_{2}O
- davidite, (La,Ce,Ca)(Y,U)(Ti,Fe^{3+})_{20}O_{38} or (Ce,La)(Y,U)(Ti,Fe^{3+})_{20}O_{38}
- torbernite, Cu[(UO_{2})(PO_{4})]_{2}·12H_{2}O
- coffinite, U(SiO_{4})_{1−x}(OH)_{4x}

Significant concentrations of uranium occur in some substances such as phosphate rock deposits, and minerals such as lignite, and monazite sands in uranium-rich ores (it is recovered commercially from sources with as little as 0.1% uranium).

=== Origin ===
Like all elements with atomic weights higher than that of iron, uranium is only naturally formed by the r-process (rapid neutron capture) in supernovae and neutron star mergers. Primordial thorium and uranium are only produced in the r-process, because the s-process (slow neutron capture) is too slow and cannot pass the gap of instability after bismuth. Besides the two extant primordial uranium isotopes, ^{235}U and ^{238}U, the r-process also produced significant quantities of ^{236}U, which has a shorter half-life and so is an extinct radionuclide, having long since decayed completely to ^{232}Th. Further uranium-236 was produced by the decay of ^{244}Pu, accounting for the observed higher-than-expected abundance of thorium and lower-than-expected abundance of uranium. While the natural abundance of uranium has been supplemented by the decay of extinct ^{242}Pu (half-life 375,000 years) and ^{247}Cm (half-life 16 million years), producing ^{238}U and ^{235}U respectively, this occurred to an almost negligible extent due to the shorter half-lives of these parents and their lower production than ^{236}U and ^{244}Pu, the parents of thorium: the ^{247}Cm/^{235}U ratio at the formation of the Solar System was (7.0±1.6)×10^{−5}.

=== Biotic and abiotic ===
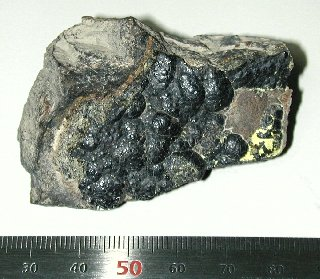
Uraninite, also known as pitchblende, is the most common ore mined to extract uranium.

The evolution of Earth's radiogenic heat flow over time: contribution from ^{235}U in red and from ^{238}U in green

Some bacteria, such as Shewanella putrefaciens, Geobacter metallireducens and some strains of Paraburkholderia fungorum, can use uranium for their growth and convert U(VI) to U(IV). Recent research suggests that this pathway includes reduction of the soluble U(VI) via an intermediate U(V) pentavalent state. Other organisms, such as the lichen Trapelia involuta or microorganisms such as the bacterium Citrobacter, can absorb concentrations of uranium that are up to 300 times the level of their environment. Citrobacter species absorb uranyl ions when given glycerol phosphate (or other similar organic phosphates). After one day, one gram of bacteria can encrust themselves with nine grams of uranyl phosphate crystals; this creates the possibility that these organisms could be used in bioremediation to decontaminate uranium-polluted water. The proteobacterium Geobacter has also been shown to bioremediate uranium in ground water. The mycorrhizal fungus Glomus intraradices increases uranium content in the roots of its symbiotic plant.

In nature, uranium(VI) forms highly soluble carbonate complexes at alkaline pH. This leads to an increase in mobility and availability of uranium to groundwater and soil from nuclear wastes which leads to health hazards. However, it is difficult to precipitate uranium as phosphate in the presence of excess carbonate at alkaline pH. A Sphingomonas sp. strain BSAR-1 has been found to express a high activity alkaline phosphatase (PhoK) that has been applied for bioprecipitation of uranium as uranyl phosphate species from alkaline solutions. The precipitation ability was enhanced by overexpressing PhoK protein in E. coli.

Plants absorb some uranium from soil. Dry weight concentrations of uranium in plants range from 5 to 60 parts per billion, and ash from burnt wood can have concentrations up to 4 parts per million. Dry weight concentrations of uranium in food plants are typically lower with one to two micrograms per day ingested through the food people eat.

=== Production and mining ===
Worldwide production of uranium in 2024 was 60,213 tonnes, of which 23,270 t (39%) was mined in Kazakhstan. Other important uranium mining countries are Canada (14,309 t), Namibia (7,333 t), Australia (4,598 t), Uzbekistan (4,000 t), and Russia (2,738 t).

Uranium ore is mined in several ways: open pit, underground, in-situ leaching, and borehole mining. Low-grade uranium ore mined typically contains 0.01 to 0.25% uranium oxides. Extensive measures must be employed to extract the metal from its ore. High-grade ores found in Athabasca Basin deposits in Saskatchewan, Canada can contain up to 23% uranium oxides on average. Uranium ore is crushed and rendered into a fine powder and then leached with either an acid or alkali. The leachate is subjected to one of several sequences of precipitation, solvent extraction, and ion exchange. The resulting mixture, called yellowcake, contains at least 75% uranium oxides U_{3}O_{8}. Yellowcake is then calcined to remove impurities from the milling process before refining and conversion.

Commercial-grade uranium can be produced through the reduction of uranium halides with alkali or alkaline earth metals. Uranium metal can also be prepared through electrolysis of KUF_{5} or UF_{4}, dissolved in molten calcium chloride (CaCl_{2}) and sodium chloride (NaCl) solution. Very pure uranium is produced through the thermal decomposition of uranium halides on a hot filament.

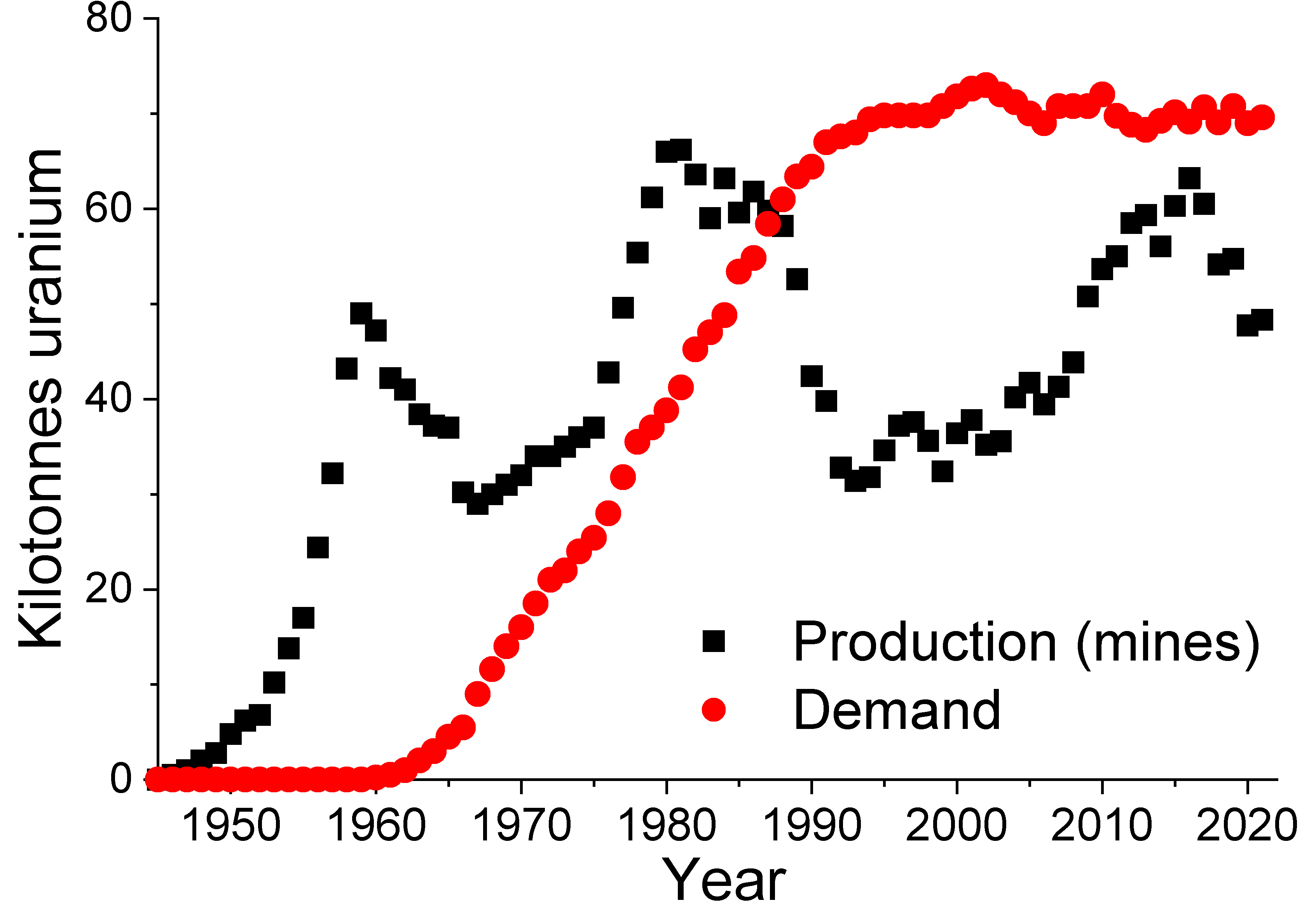
World uranium production (mines) and demand

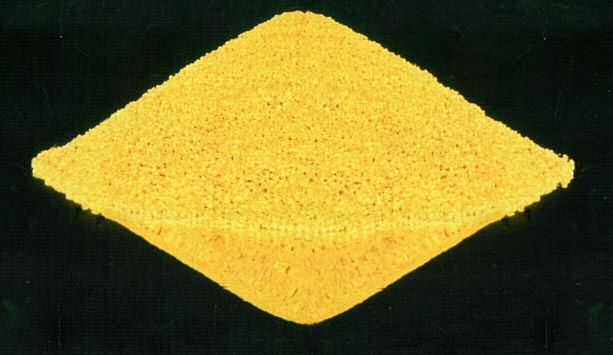
Yellowcake is a concentrated mixture of uranium oxides that is further refined to extract pure uranium.

=== Resources and reserves ===
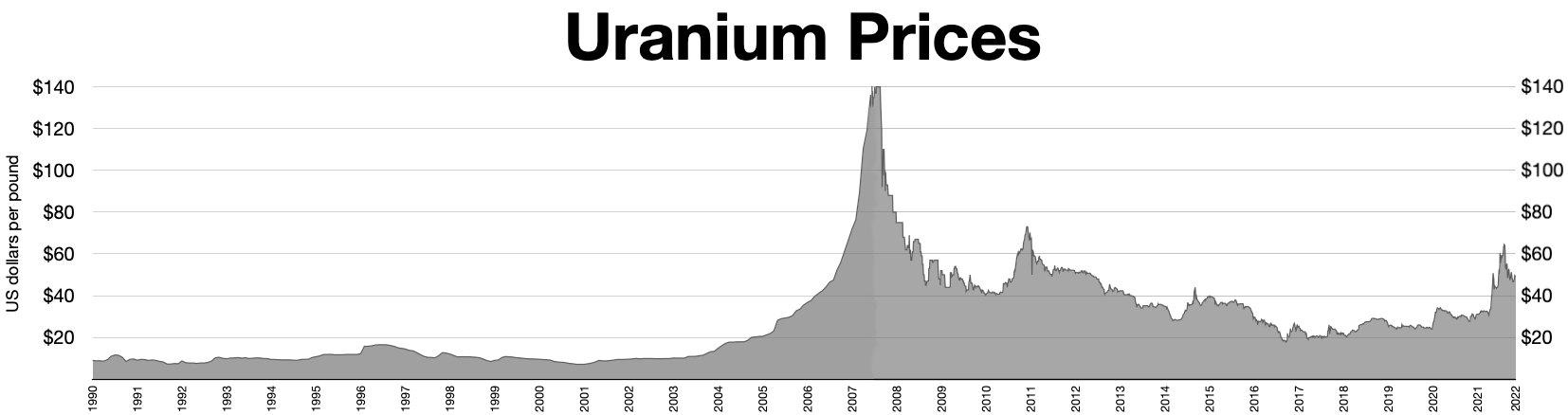
Uranium price 1990–2022.

It is estimated that 6.1 million tonnes of uranium exists in ores that are economically viable at US$130 per kg of uranium, while 35 million tonnes are classed as mineral resources (reasonable prospects for eventual economic extraction).

Australia has 28% of the world's known uranium ore reserves and the world's largest single uranium deposit is located at the Olympic Dam Mine in South Australia. There is a significant reserve of uranium in Bakouma, a sub-prefecture in the prefecture of Mbomou in the Central African Republic.

Some uranium also originates from dismantled nuclear weapons. For example, in 1993–2013 Russia supplied the United States with 15,000 tonnes of low-enriched uranium within the Megatons to Megawatts Program.

An additional 4.6 billion tonnes of uranium are estimated to be dissolved in sea water (Japanese scientists in the 1980s showed that extraction of uranium from sea water using ion exchangers was technically feasible). There have been experiments to extract uranium from sea water, but the yield has been low due to the carbonate present in the water. In 2012, ORNL researchers announced the successful development of a new absorbent material dubbed HiCap which performs surface retention of solid or gas molecules, atoms or ions and also effectively removes toxic metals from water, according to results verified by researchers at Pacific Northwest National Laboratory.

=== Supplies ===
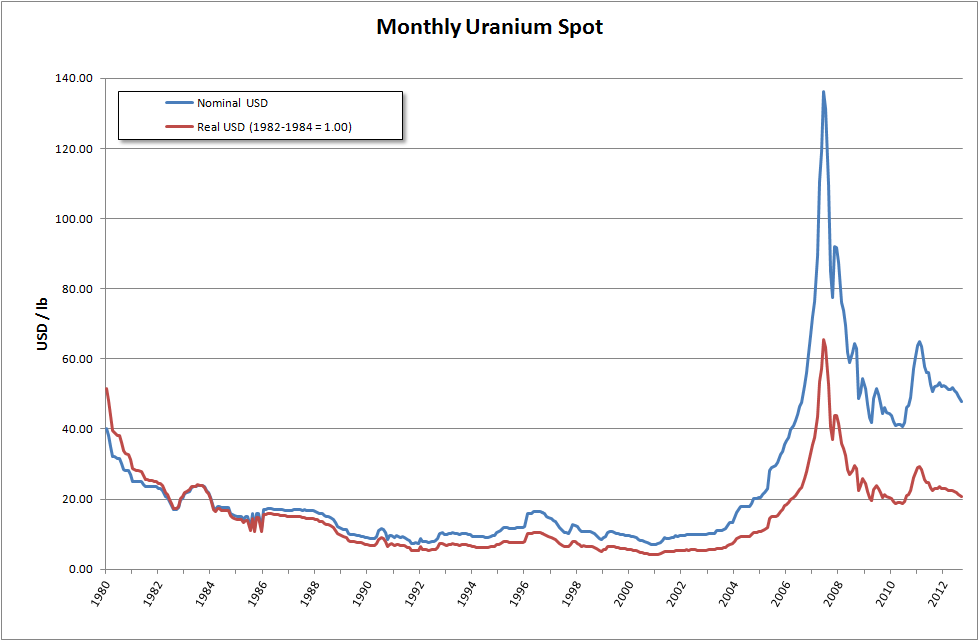
Monthly uranium spot price in US$ per pound. The 2007 price peak is clearly visible.

In 2005, ten countries accounted for the majority of the world's concentrated uranium oxides: Canada (27.9%), Australia (22.8%), Kazakhstan (10.5%), Russia (8.0%), Namibia (7.5%), Niger (7.4%), Uzbekistan (5.5%), the United States (2.5%), Argentina (2.1%) and Ukraine (1.9%). In 2008, Kazakhstan was forecast to increase production and become the world's largest supplier of uranium by 2009; Kazakhstan has dominated the world's uranium market since 2010. In 2021, its share was 45.1%, followed by Namibia (11.9%), Canada (9.7%), Australia (8.7%), Uzbekistan (7.2%), Niger (4.7%), Russia (5.5%), China (3.9%), India (1.3%), Ukraine (0.9%), and South Africa (0.8%), with a world total production of 48,332 tonnes. Most uranium was produced not by conventional underground mining of ores (29% of production), but by in-situ leaching (66%).

In the late 1960s, UN geologists discovered major uranium deposits and other rare mineral reserves in Somalia. The find was the largest of its kind, with industry experts estimating the deposits at over 25% of the world's then known uranium reserves of 800,000 tons.

The ultimate available supply is believed to be sufficient for at least the next 85 years, though some studies indicate underinvestment in the late twentieth century may produce supply problems in the 21st century. Uranium deposits seem to be log-normal distributed. There is a 300-fold increase in the amount of uranium recoverable for each tenfold decrease in ore grade. In other words, there is little high grade ore and proportionately much more low grade ore available.

== Compounds ==
Reactions of uranium metal

=== Oxidation states and oxides ===
==== Oxides ====
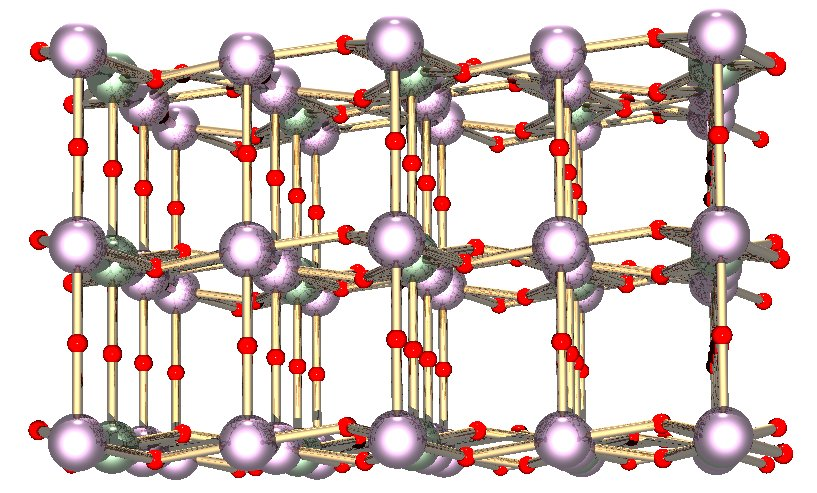
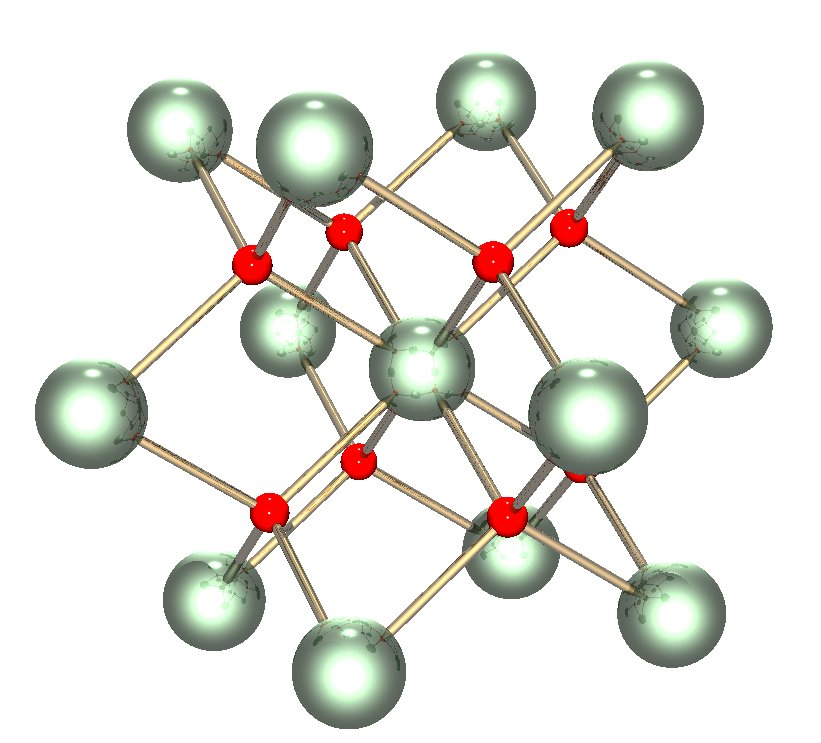
Triuranium octoxide (left) and uranium dioxide (right) are the two most common uranium oxides.

Calcined uranium yellowcake, as produced in many large mills, contains a distribution of uranium oxidation species in various forms ranging from most oxidized to least oxidized. Particles with short residence times in a calciner will generally be less oxidized than those with long retention times or particles recovered in the stack scrubber. Uranium content is usually referenced to U_{3}O_{8}, which dates to the days of the Manhattan Project when U_{3}O_{8} was used as an analytical chemistry reporting standard.

Phase relationships in the uranium-oxygen system are complex. The most important oxidation states of uranium are uranium(IV) and uranium(VI), and their two corresponding oxides are, respectively, uranium dioxide (UO_{2}) and uranium trioxide (UO_{3}). Other uranium oxides such as uranium monoxide (UO), diuranium pentoxide (U_{2}O_{5}), and uranium peroxide (UO_{4}·2H_{2}O) also exist.

The most common forms of uranium oxide are triuranium octoxide (U_{3}O_{8}) and UO_{2}. Both oxide forms are solids that have low solubility in water and are relatively stable over a wide range of environmental conditions. Triuranium octoxide is (depending on conditions) the most stable compound of uranium and is the form most commonly found in nature. Uranium dioxide is the form in which uranium is most commonly used as a nuclear reactor fuel. At ambient temperatures, UO_{2} will gradually convert to U_{3}O_{8}. Because of their stability, uranium oxides are generally considered the preferred chemical form for storage or disposal.

==== Aqueous chemistry ====
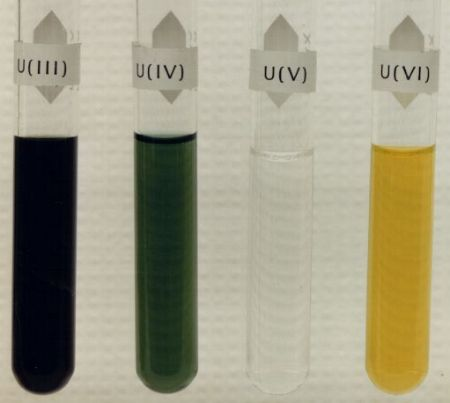
Uranium in its oxidation states III, IV, V, VI

Salts of many oxidation states of uranium are water-soluble and may be studied in aqueous solutions. The most common ionic forms are U^{3+} (brown-red), U^{4+} (green), UO_{2}^{+} (unstable), and UO_{2}^{2+} (yellow), for U(III), U(IV), U(V), and U(VI), respectively. A few solid and semi-metallic compounds such as UO and US exist for the formal oxidation state uranium(II), but no simple ions are known to exist in solution for that state. Ions of U^{3+} liberate hydrogen from water and are therefore considered to be highly unstable. The UO_{2}^{2+} ion represents the uranium(VI) state and is known to form compounds such as uranyl carbonate, uranyl chloride and uranyl sulfate. UO_{2}^{2+} also forms complexes with various organic chelating agents, the most commonly encountered of which is uranyl acetate.

Unlike the uranyl salts of uranium and polyatomic ion uranium-oxide cationic forms, the uranates, salts containing a polyatomic uranium-oxide anion, are generally not water-soluble.

==== Carbonates ====
The interactions of carbonate anions with uranium(VI) cause the Pourbaix diagram to change greatly when the medium is changed from water to a carbonate containing solution. While the vast majority of carbonates are insoluble in water (students are often taught that all carbonates other than those of alkali metals are insoluble in water), uranium carbonates are often soluble in water. This is because a U(VI) cation is able to bind two terminal oxides and three or more carbonates to form anionic complexes.

Pourbaix diagrams
A graph of potential vs. pH showing stability regions of various uranium compounds	A graph of potential vs. pH showing stability regions of various uranium compounds
Uranium in a non-complexing aqueous medium (e.g. perchloric acid/sodium hydroxide).	Uranium in carbonate solution
A graph of potential vs. pH showing stability regions of various uranium compounds	A graph of potential vs. pH showing stability regions of various uranium compounds
Relative concentrations of the different chemical forms of uranium in a non-complexing aqueous medium (e.g. perchloric acid/sodium hydroxide).	Relative concentrations of the different chemical forms of uranium in an aqueous carbonate solution.

==== Effects of pH ====
The uranium fraction diagrams in the presence of carbonate illustrate this further: when the pH of a uranium(VI) solution increases, the uranium is converted to a hydrated uranium oxide hydroxide; At high pH, it becomes an anionic hydroxide complex.

When carbonate is added, uranium is converted to a series of carbonate complexes if the pH is increased. One effect of these reactions is increased solubility of uranium in the pH range 6 to 8, a fact that has a direct bearing on the long term stability of spent uranium dioxide nuclear fuels.

=== Hydrides, carbides and nitrides ===
Uranium metal heated to 250 to 300 °C (482 to 572 °F) reacts with hydrogen to form uranium hydride. Even higher temperatures will reversibly remove the hydrogen. This property makes uranium hydrides convenient starting materials to create reactive uranium powder along with various uranium carbide, nitride, and halide compounds. Two crystal modifications of uranium hydride exist: an α form that is obtained at low temperatures and a β form that is created when the formation temperature is above 250 °C.

Uranium carbides and uranium nitrides are both relatively inert semimetallic compounds that are minimally soluble in acids, react with water, and can ignite in air to form U_{3}O_{8}. Carbides of uranium include uranium monocarbide (UC), uranium dicarbide (UC_{2}), and diuranium tricarbide (U_{2}C_{3}). Both UC and UC_{2} are formed by adding carbon to molten uranium or by exposing the metal to carbon monoxide at high temperatures. Stable below 1800 °C, U_{2}C_{3} is prepared by subjecting a heated mixture of UC and UC_{2} to mechanical stress. Uranium nitrides obtained by direct exposure of the metal to nitrogen include uranium mononitride (UN), uranium dinitride (UN_{2}), and diuranium trinitride (U_{2}N_{3}).

=== Halides ===
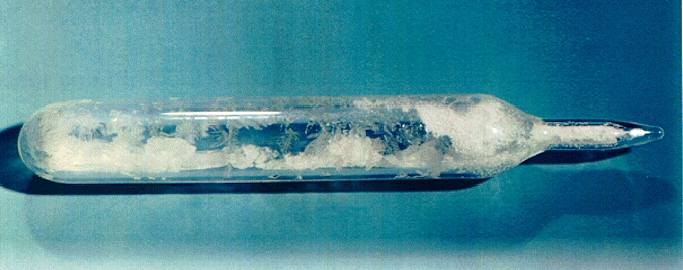
Uranium hexafluoride is the feedstock used to separate uranium-235 from natural uranium.

All uranium fluorides are created using uranium tetrafluoride (UF_{4}); UF_{4} itself is prepared by hydrofluorination of uranium dioxide. Reduction of UF_{4} with hydrogen at 1000 °C produces uranium trifluoride (UF_{3}). Under the right conditions of temperature and pressure, the reaction of solid UF_{4} with gaseous uranium hexafluoride (UF_{6}) can form the intermediate fluorides of U_{2}F_{9}, U_{4}F_{17}, and UF_{5}.

At room temperatures, UF_{6} has a high vapor pressure, making it useful in the gaseous diffusion process to separate the rare uranium-235 from the common uranium-238 isotope. This compound can be prepared from uranium dioxide and uranium hydride by the following process:

UO_{2} + 4 HF → UF_{4} + 2 H_{2}O (500 °C, endothermic)
UF_{4} + F_{2} → UF_{6} (350 °C, endothermic)

The resulting UF_{6}, a white solid, is highly reactive (by fluorination), easily sublimes (emitting a vapor that behaves as a nearly ideal gas), and is the most volatile compound of uranium known to exist.

Uranium hexafluorides (IV) and (V) can be used to make several hexafluorouranates, as they are anions (UF_{6}^{−} and UF_{6}^{2−}). They bond with alkali metals, certain transition metals, and other non-metal compounds.

One method of preparing uranium tetrachloride (UCl_{4}) is to directly combine chlorine with either uranium metal or uranium hydride. The reduction of UCl_{4} by hydrogen produces uranium trichloride (UCl_{3}) while the higher chlorides of uranium are prepared by reaction with additional chlorine. All uranium chlorides react with water and air.

Bromides and iodides of uranium are formed by direct reaction of, respectively, bromine and iodine with uranium or by adding UH_{3} to those element's acids. Known examples include: UBr_{3}, UBr_{4}, UI_{3}, and UI_{4}. UI_{5} has never been prepared. Uranium oxyhalides are water-soluble and include UO_{2}F_{2}, UOCl_{2}, UO_{2}Cl_{2}, and UO_{2}Br_{2}. Stability of the oxyhalides decrease as the atomic weight of the component halide increases.

== Isotopes ==
Uranium, like all elements with an atomic number greater than 82, has no stable isotopes. All isotopes of uranium are radioactive because the strong nuclear force does not prevail over electromagnetic repulsion in nuclides containing more than 82 protons. Nevertheless, the two most stable isotopes, ^{238}U and ^{235}U, have half-lives long enough to occur in nature as primordial radionuclides, with measurable quantities having survived since the formation of the Earth. These two nuclides, along with thorium-232, are the only confirmed primordial nuclides heavier than nearly-stable bismuth-209. (Note: The occurrence of plutonium-244 as a primordial nuclide is disputed, though some reports of its detection have also been attributed to infall from the interstellar medium.)

Natural uranium consists of three major isotopes: uranium-238 (99.28% natural abundance), uranium-235 (0.71%), and uranium-234 (0.0054%). There are also five other trace isotopes: uranium-240, a decay product of plutonium-244; uranium-239, which is formed when ^{238}U undergoes spontaneous fission, releasing neutrons that are captured by another ^{238}U atom; uranium-237, which is formed when ^{238}U captures a neutron but emits two more, which then decays to neptunium-237; uranium-236, which occurs in trace quantities due to neutron capture on ^{235}U and as a decay product of plutonium-244; and finally, uranium-233, which is formed in the decay chain of neptunium-237. Additionally, uranium-232 would be produced by the double beta decay of natural thorium-232, though this energetically possible process has never been observed.

Uranium-238 is the most stable isotope of uranium, with a half-life of about 4.463×10^{9} years, roughly the age of the Earth. Uranium-238 is predominantly an alpha emitter, decaying to thorium-234. It ultimately decays through the uranium series, which has 18 members, into lead-206. Uranium-238 is not fissile, but is a fertile isotope, because after neutron activation it can be converted to plutonium-239, another fissile isotope. Indeed, the ^{238}U nucleus can absorb one neutron to produce the radioactive isotope uranium-239. ^{239}U decays by beta emission to neptunium-239, also a beta-emitter, that decays in its turn, within a few days into plutonium-239. ^{239}Pu was used as fissile material in the first atomic bomb detonated in the "Trinity test" on 16 July 1945 in New Mexico.

Uranium-235 has a half-life of about 7.04×10^{8} years; it is the next most stable uranium isotope after ^{238}U and is also predominantly an alpha emitter, decaying to thorium-231. Uranium-235 is important for both nuclear reactors and nuclear weapons, because it is the only uranium isotope existing in nature on Earth in significant amounts that is fissile. This means that it can be split into two or three fragments (fission products) by thermal neutrons. The decay chain of ^{235}U, which is called the actinium series, has 15 members and eventually decays into lead-207. The constant rates of decay in these decay series makes the comparison of the ratios of parent to daughter elements useful in radiometric dating.

Uranium-236 has a half-life of 2.342×10^{7} years and is not found in significant quantities in nature. The half-life of uranium-236 is too short for it to be primordial, though it has been identified as an extinct progenitor of its alpha decay daughter, thorium-232. Uranium-236 occurs in spent nuclear fuel when neutron capture on ^{235}U does not induce fission, or as a decay product of plutonium-240. Uranium-236 is not fertile, as three more neutron captures are required to produce fissile ^{239}Pu, and is not itself fissile; as such, it is considered long-lived radioactive waste.

Uranium-234 is a member of the uranium series and occurs in equilibrium with its progenitor, ^{238}U; it undergoes alpha decay with a half-life of 245,500 years and decays to lead-206 through a series of relatively short-lived isotopes.

Uranium-233 undergoes alpha decay with a half-life of 160,000 years and, like ^{235}U, is fissile. It can be bred from thorium-232 via neutron bombardment, usually in a nuclear reactor; this process is known as the thorium fuel cycle. Owing to the fissility of ^{233}U and the greater natural abundance of thorium (three times that of uranium), ^{233}U has been investigated for use as nuclear fuel as a possible alternative to ^{235}U and ^{239}Pu, though is not in widespread use as of 2022. The decay chain of uranium-233 forms part of the neptunium series and ends at nearly-stable bismuth-209 (half-life 2.01×10^{19} years) and stable thallium-205.

Uranium-232 is an alpha emitter with a half-life of 68.9 years. This isotope is produced as a byproduct in production of ^{233}U and is considered a nuisance, as it is not fissile and decays through short-lived alpha and gamma emitters such as ^{208}Tl. It is also expected that thorium-232 should be able to undergo double beta decay, which would produce uranium-232, but this has not yet been observed experimentally.

All isotopes from ^{232}U to ^{236}U inclusive have minor cluster decay branches (less than 10^{−10}%), and all these bar ^{233}U, in addition to ^{238}U, have minor spontaneous fission branches; the greatest branching ratio for spontaneous fission is about 5×10^{−5}% for ^{238}U, or about one in every two million decays. The shorter-lived trace isotopes ^{237}U and ^{239}U exclusively undergo beta decay, with respective half-lives of 6.752 days and 23.45 minutes.

In total, 28 isotopes of uranium have been identified, ranging in mass number from 214 to 242, with the exception of 220. Among the uranium isotopes not found in natural samples or nuclear fuel, the longest-lived is ^{230}U, an alpha emitter with a half-life of 20.23 days. This isotope has been considered for use in targeted alpha-particle therapy (TAT). All other isotopes have half-lives shorter than one hour, except for ^{231}U (half-life 4.2 days) and ^{240}U (half-life 14.1 hours). The shortest-lived known isotope is ^{221}U, with a half-life of 660 nanoseconds, and it is expected that the hitherto unknown ^{220}U has an even shorter half-life. The proton-rich isotopes lighter than ^{232}U primarily undergo alpha decay, except for ^{229}U and ^{231}U, which decay to protactinium isotopes via positron emission and electron capture, respectively; the neutron-rich ^{240}U, ^{241}U, and ^{242}U undergo beta decay to form neptunium isotopes.

=== Enrichment ===
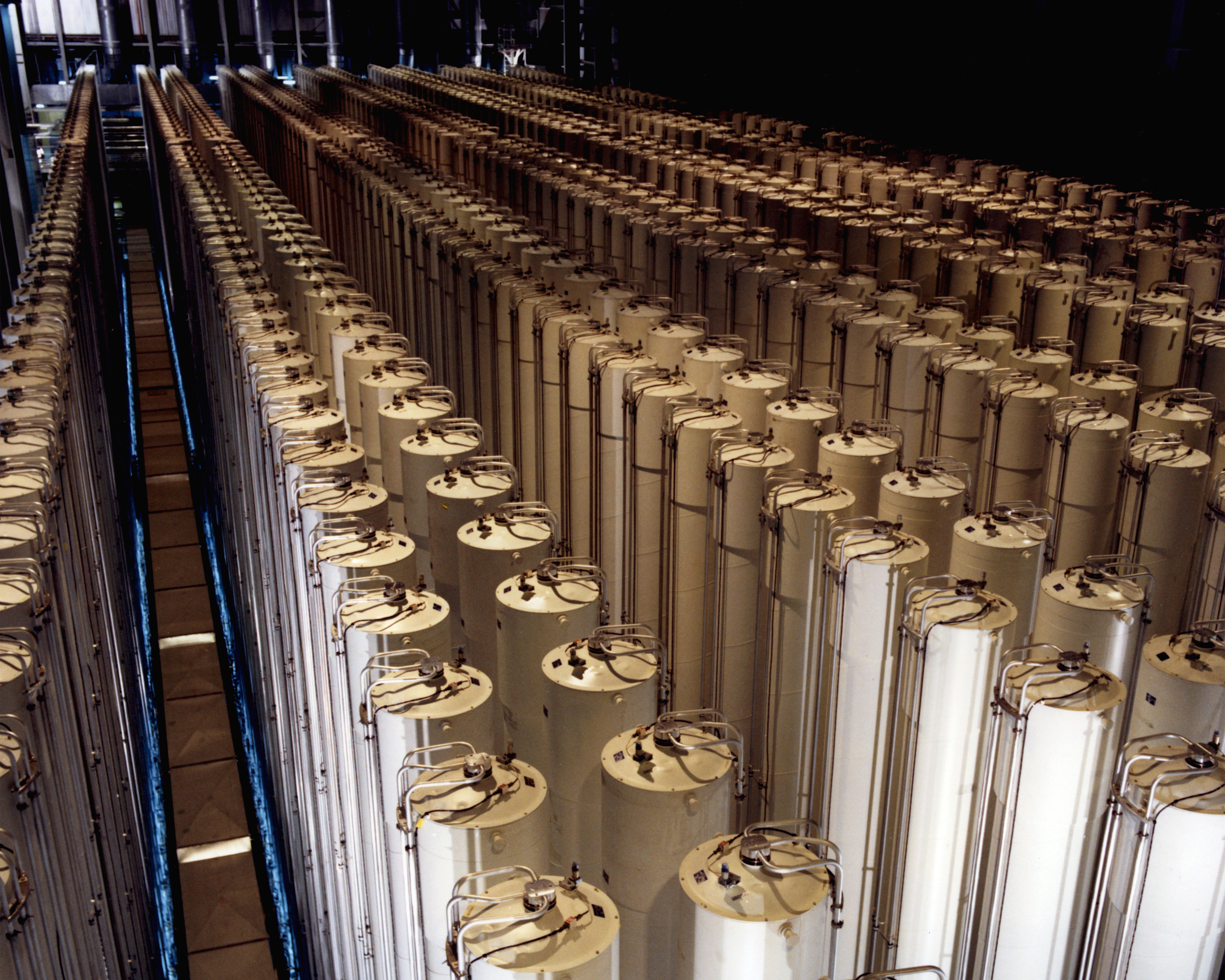
Cascades of gas centrifuges are used to enrich uranium ore to concentrate its fissionable isotopes.

In nature, uranium is found as uranium-238 (99.2742%) and uranium-235 (0.7204%). Isotope separation concentrates (enriches) the fissile uranium-235 for nuclear weapons and most nuclear power plants, except for gas cooled reactors and pressurized heavy water reactors. Most neutrons released by a fissioning atom of uranium-235 must impact other uranium-235 atoms to sustain the nuclear chain reaction. The concentration and amount of uranium-235 needed to achieve this is called a 'critical mass'.

To be considered 'enriched', the uranium-235 fraction should be between 3% and 5%. This process produces huge quantities of uranium that is depleted of uranium-235 and with a correspondingly increased fraction of uranium-238, called depleted uranium or 'DU'. To be considered 'depleted', the ^{235}U concentration should be no more than 0.3%. The price of uranium has risen since 2001, so enrichment tailings containing more than 0.35% uranium-235 are being considered for re-enrichment, driving the price of depleted uranium hexafluoride above $130 per kilogram in July 2007 from $5 in 2001.

The gas centrifuge process, where gaseous uranium hexafluoride (UF_{6}) is separated by the difference in molecular weight between ^{235}UF_{6} and ^{238}UF_{6} using high-speed centrifuges, is the cheapest and leading enrichment process. The gaseous diffusion process had been the leading method for enrichment and was used in the Manhattan Project. In this process, uranium hexafluoride is repeatedly diffused through a silver-zinc membrane, and the different isotopes of uranium are separated by diffusion rate (since uranium-238 is heavier it diffuses slightly slower than uranium-235). The molecular laser isotope separation method employs a laser beam of precise energy to sever the bond between uranium-235 and fluorine. This leaves uranium-238 bonded to fluorine and allows uranium-235 metal to precipitate from the solution. An alternative laser method of enrichment is known as atomic vapor laser isotope separation (AVLIS) and employs visible tunable lasers such as dye lasers. Another method used is liquid thermal diffusion.

The only significant deviation from the ^{235}U to ^{238}U ratio in any known natural samples occurs in Oklo, Gabon, where natural nuclear fission reactors consumed some of the ^{235}U some two billion years ago when the ratio of ^{235}U to ^{238}U was more akin to that of low enriched uranium allowing regular ("light") water to act as a neutron moderator akin to the process in humanmade light water reactors. The existence of such natural fission reactors which had been theoretically predicted beforehand was proven as the slight deviation of ^{235}U concentration from the expected values were discovered during uranium enrichment in France. Subsequent investigations to rule out any nefarious human action (such as stealing of ^{235}U) confirmed the theory by finding isotope ratios of common fission products (or rather their stable daughter nuclides) in line with the values expected for fission but deviating from the values expected for non-fission derived samples of those elements.

== Human exposure ==
A person can be exposed to uranium (or its radioactive daughters, such as radon) by inhaling dust in air or by ingesting contaminated water and food. The amount of uranium in air is usually very small; however, people who work in factories that process phosphate fertilizers containing uranium impurities, live near government facilities that made or tested nuclear weapons, live or work near a modern battlefield where depleted uranium weapons have been used, or live or work near a coal-fired power plant, facilities that mine or process uranium ore, or enrich uranium for reactor fuel, may have increased exposure to uranium. Houses or structures that are over uranium deposits (either natural or man-made slag deposits) may have an increased incidence of exposure to radon gas.

The health impacts of natural and of depleted uranium are chemical rather than due to radiation. The Occupational Safety and Health Administration (OSHA) has set the permissible exposure limit for uranium exposure in the workplace as 0.25 mg/m^{3} over an 8-hour workday. The National Institute for Occupational Safety and Health (NIOSH) has set a recommended exposure limit (REL) of 0.2 mg/m^{3} over an 8-hour workday and a short-term limit of 0.6 mg/m^{3}. At 10 mg/m^{3}, uranium is immediately dangerous to life and health.

Most ingested uranium is excreted during digestion. Only 0.5% is absorbed when insoluble forms of uranium, such as its oxide, are ingested, whereas absorption of the more soluble uranyl ion can be up to 5%. However, soluble uranium compounds tend to quickly pass through the body, whereas insoluble uranium compounds, especially when inhaled by way of dust into the lungs, pose a more serious exposure hazard. After entering the bloodstream, the absorbed uranium tends to bioaccumulate and stay for many years in bone tissue because of uranium's affinity for phosphates. Incorporated uranium becomes uranyl ions, which accumulate in bone, liver, kidney, and reproductive tissues.

Elements of high atomic number like uranium exhibit phantom or secondary radiotoxicity through absorption of natural background gamma and X-rays and re-emission of photoelectrons, which in combination with the high affinity of uranium to the phosphate moiety of DNA cause increased single and double strand DNA breaks.

Uranium is not absorbed through the skin, and alpha particles released by uranium cannot penetrate the skin.

Uranium can be decontaminated from steel surfaces and aquifers.

=== Effects and precautions ===
Normal functioning of the kidney, brain, liver, heart, and other systems can be affected by uranium exposure, because, besides being weakly radioactive, uranium is a toxic metal. Uranium is also a reproductive toxicant. Radiological effects are generally local because alpha radiation, the primary form of ^{238}U decay, has a very short range, and will not penetrate skin. Alpha radiation from inhaled uranium has been demonstrated to cause lung cancer in exposed nuclear workers. The Centers for Disease Control have published one study stating that neither natural nor depleted uranium have been classified with respect to carcinogenicity. Exposure to its decay products, especially radon, is a significant health threat, and uranium processing produces wastes contaminated with radium which in turn produces radon gas. Because of its long half-life, purified uranium will not produce significant amounts of daughter nuclides for millions of years. Exposure to strontium-90, iodine-131, and other fission products is unrelated to uranium exposure, but may result from medical procedures or exposure to spent reactor fuel or fallout from nuclear weapons.

Although accidental inhalation exposure to a high concentration of uranium hexafluoride has resulted in human fatalities, those deaths were associated with the generation of highly toxic hydrofluoric acid and uranyl fluoride rather than with uranium itself. Finely divided uranium metal presents a fire hazard because uranium is pyrophoric; small grains will ignite spontaneously in air at room temperature.

Uranium metal is commonly handled with gloves as a sufficient precaution. Uranium concentrate is handled and contained so as to ensure that people do not inhale or ingest it.

== See also ==
- K-65 residues
- List of countries by uranium production
- List of countries by uranium reserves
- List of uranium projects
- Lists of nuclear disasters and radioactive incidents
- Nuclear and radiation accidents and incidents
- Nuclear engineering
- Nuclear fuel cycle
- Nuclear physics
- Quintuple bond (earlier thought to be a phi bond), in the molecule U_{2}
- Thorium fuel cycle
- World Uranium Hearing

== Sources cited ==
- Emsley, John (2001). "Uranium". Nature's Building Blocks: An A to Z Guide to the Elements. Oxford, England: Oxford University Press. pp. 476–482. ISBN 978-0-19-850340-8.
- Seaborg, Glenn T. (1968). "Uranium". The Encyclopedia of the Chemical Elements. Skokie, Illinois: Reinhold Book Corporation. pp. 773–786. LCCN 68029938.
- Groves, Leslie R. (1962). Now It Can Be Told: The Story of the Manhattan Project. New York: Harper and Company. ISBN 0-306-80189-2.
