= Uranyl chloride =

- [O=U=O]Cl_{2}

Names
- IUPAC name Dichlorodioxouranium
- Other names Uranium(VI), dichlorodioxy Uranium(VI) dichloride dioxide

Identifiers
CAS Number	7791-26-6
3D model (JSmol)	Interactive image; hydrate: Interactive image; dihydrate: Interactive image; trihydrate: Interactive image
ChemSpider	21172763
ECHA InfoCard	100.029.315
EC Number	232-246-1
PubChem CID	hydrate: 129671572; dihydrate: 129693634; trihydrate: 20376300
UNII	W2V47QQ17S
CompTox Dashboard (EPA)	DTXSID0064882
- InChI: hydrate: InChI=1S/2ClH.H2O.2O.U/h2*1H;1H2;;;/q;;;;;+2/p-2 Key: DPJRXHIPGVVIJZ-UHFFFAOYSA-L; dihydrate: InChI=1S/2ClH.2H2O.2O.U/h2*1H;2*1H2;;;/q;;;;;;+2/p-2 Key: FGKUZTMTIQYKJZ-UHFFFAOYSA-L; trihydrate: InChI=1S/2ClH.3H2O.2O.U/h2*1H;3*1H2;;;/q;;;;;;;+2/p-2 Key: BYLGCROXFJTSJF-UHFFFAOYSA-L
- SMILES: [Cl-].O=[U+2]=O.[Cl-]; hydrate: O.O=[U+2]=O.[Cl-].[Cl-]; dihydrate: O.O.O=[U+2]=O.[Cl-].[Cl-]; trihydrate: O.O.O.O=[U+2]=O.[Cl-].[Cl-]

Properties
Chemical formula	UO_{2}Cl_{2}
Molar mass	340.93 g·mol^{−1}
Appearance	bright yellow large crystals
Melting point	Decomposes
Boiling point	Decomposes
Solubility in water	soluble
Solubility	Soluble in alcohols, acetone and ethers, insoluble in benzene

Hazards
Safety data sheet (SDS)	External MSDS

Related compounds
Other anions	Uranyl fluoride; Uranyl bromide; Uranyl iodide
Other cations	Chromyl chloride; Molybdenum dichloride dioxide; Tungsten dichloride dioxide; Sulfuryl chloride
Related uranium chlorides	Uranium hexachloride
- Except where otherwise noted, data are given for materials in their standard state (at 25 °C [77 °F], 100 kPa). verify (what is ?) Infobox references

Uranyl chloride is the inorganic compound with the chemical formula UO_{2}Cl_{2}. It is a fluorescent water soluble compound. Uranyl chloride also refers to inorganic compounds with the formula UO_{2}Cl_{2}(H_{2}O)_{n} where n = 0, 1, 2, or 3. These are yellow salts.

== Synthesis and structures ==
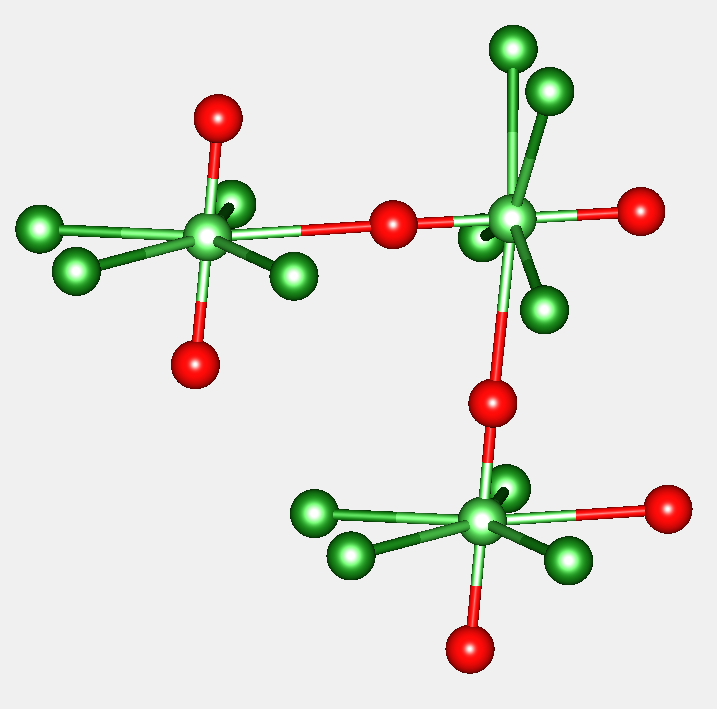
Fragment of lattice of UO_{2}Cl_{2} (anhydrous) showing 7-coordinate U centers with trans oxo ligands. Color code: red = O, green = Cl. Selected distances: U-O, 169, U-Cl, 264-275 pm.

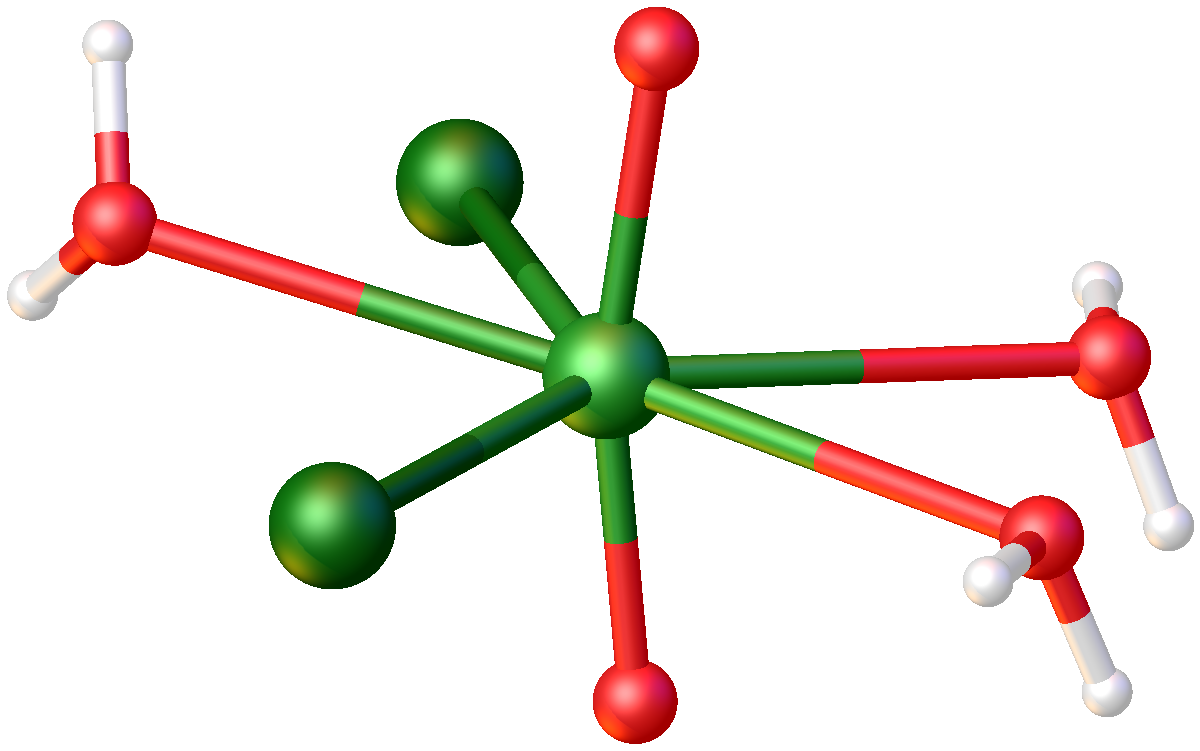
Structure of the molecular complex uranyl chloride trihydrate (UO_{2}Cl_{2}(H_{2}O)_{3}). Color scheme: red = O, green = U, darker green = Cl, white = H.

Anhydrous uranyl chloride is a coordination polymer. It reacts and depolymerizes upon treatment with water. The hydrates are also obtained by treating aqueous uranyl sulfate or uranyl acetate with hydrochloric acid. Depending on the method of drying, one obtains the mono- or the trihydrate. The monohydrate is described as a yellow, sulfur-like powder. It is very hygroscopic. The trihydrate is greenish-yellow. Both hydrates are fluorescent solids that are highly soluble in water.

The anhydrous material can be obtained by the reaction of oxygen with uranium tetrachloride:

UCl_{4} + O_{2} → UO_{2}Cl_{2} + Cl_{2}

The anhydrous material can also be obtained by the heating the hydrate under a stream of gaseous hydrogen chloride.ref name=Brauer/>

In terms of structures, all three of these compounds feature the uranyl center (trans-UO^{2+}_{2}) bound to five additional ligands, which can include (bridging) chloride, water, or another uranyl oxygen.

== Reactions ==
The aquo ligands can be replaced by a variety of donors, e.g. THF. Uranyl chloride, and its two hydrates, (UO_{2}Cl_{2}·H_{2}O and UO_{2}Cl_{2}·3H_{2}O) decompose in the presence of light. This photosensitivity over the years, from time to time, has attracted scientific interest and there have been various unsuccessful attempts to develop applications in photography using these compounds.

== Safety ==
Uranyl chloride is radioactive. The uranyl cation is toxic, because the body can't tell it apart from calcium, being very chemically stable and having a +2 charge, just like calcium.
