= Uranyl peroxide =

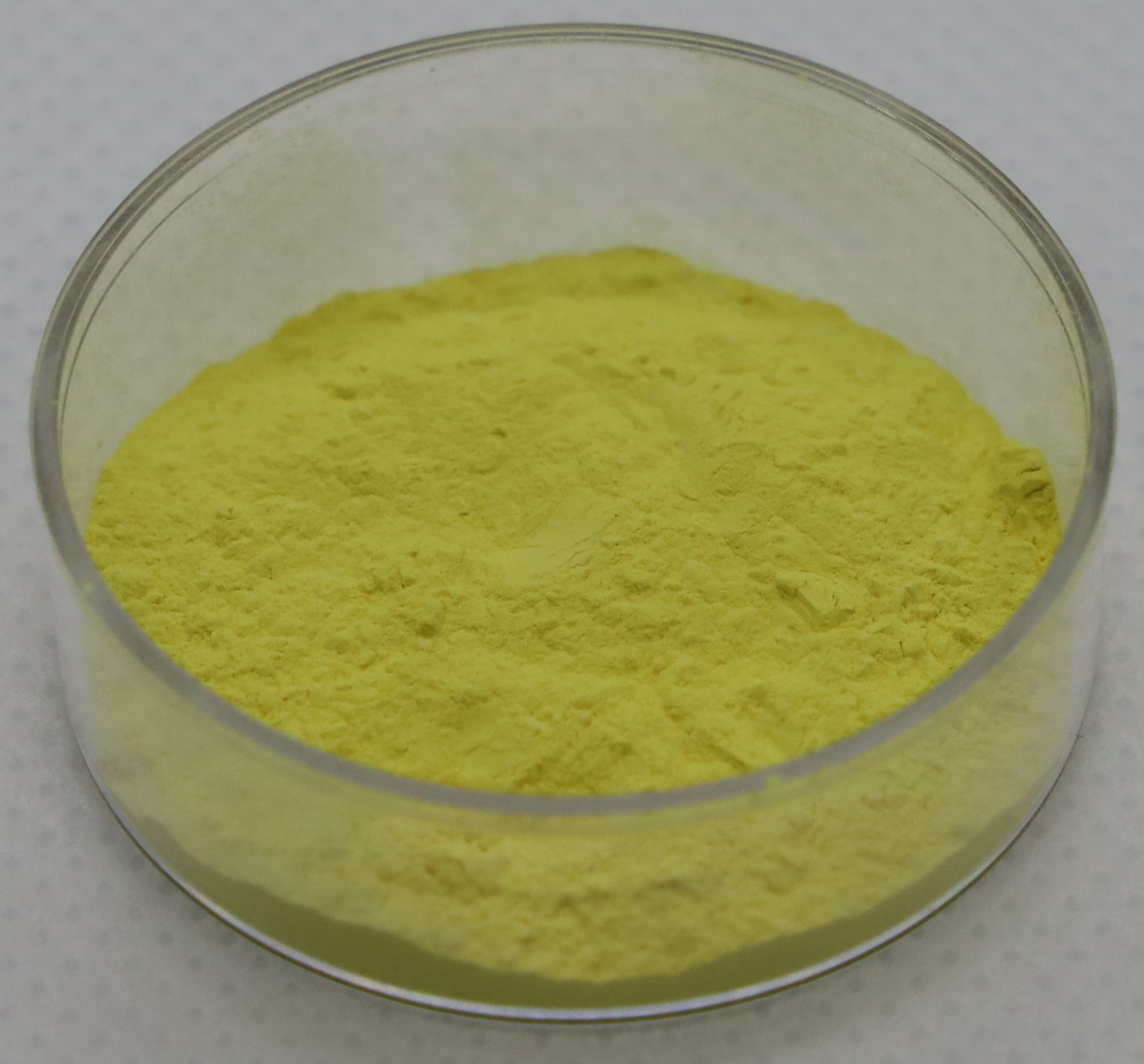
- Uranyl peroxide

Identifiers
| CAS Number | 12036-71-4 |
| 3D model (JSmol) | Interactive image |
| ChemSpider | 32816408 |
| ECHA InfoCard | 100.031.671 |
| EC Number | 234-852-1 |
| PubChem CID | hydrate: 29645 |
| UNII | 7TIU7JF0EV |
| UN number | 2909 |
- InChI: InChI=1S/O2.2O.U/c1-2;;;/q3*-2;+6 Key: XFDGHOMYEXQKDC-UHFFFAOYSA-N
- SMILES: [O-2].[O-2].[O-][O-].[U+6]

Properties
| Chemical formula | UO_{4}·nH_{2}O |
| Molar mass | 302.03 g/mol (as UO_{4}) |
- Except where otherwise noted, data are given for materials in their standard state (at 25 °C [77 °F], 100 kPa). verify (what is ?) Infobox references

Uranyl peroxide or uranium peroxide hydrate (UO_{4}·nH_{2}O) is a pale-yellow, soluble peroxide of uranium. It is found to be present at one stage of the enriched uranium fuel cycle and in yellowcake prepared via the in situ leaching and resin ion exchange system. This compound, also expressed as UO_{3}·(H_{2}O_{2})·(H_{2}O), is very similar to uranium trioxide hydrate UO_{3}·nH_{2}O. The dissolution behaviour of both compounds are very sensitive to the hydration state (n can vary between 0 and 4). One main characteristic of uranium peroxide is that it consists of small needles with an average AMAD of about 1.1 μm.

The uranyl minerals studtite, UO_{4}·4H_{2}O, and metastudtite, UO_{4}·2H_{2}O, are the only minerals discovered to date found to contain peroxide. The product is a light yellow powder.

== Synthesis ==
In general, uranyl peroxide can be obtained from a solution of uranium(VI) by adding a peroxide, usually hydrogen peroxide solution. The dihydrate is obtained from a boiling solution of uranyl nitrate with the addition of hydrogen peroxide and drying of the precipitate, while the trihydrate is precipitated from a solution of ammonium uranyl oxalate.

== Crystal structure ==
The unit cell consists of uranyl cations coordinated to two water molecules and two peroxide anions. The latter are μ^{2}-coordinated to the cation—that is, end-on. Additional water molecules are bound in the crystal by hydrogen bonding. Only the tetrahydrate has been characterized by X-ray crystallography, but density functional theory offers a good approximation to the dihydrate.

=== Polyperoxouranylate allotrope ===
When uranyl nitrate is dissolved in an aqueous solution of hydrogen peroxide and an alkali metal hydroxide, it forms cage clusters akin to polyoxometalates or fullerenes. Syntheses also typically add organic materials, such as amines, to serve as templates, akin to zeolites.

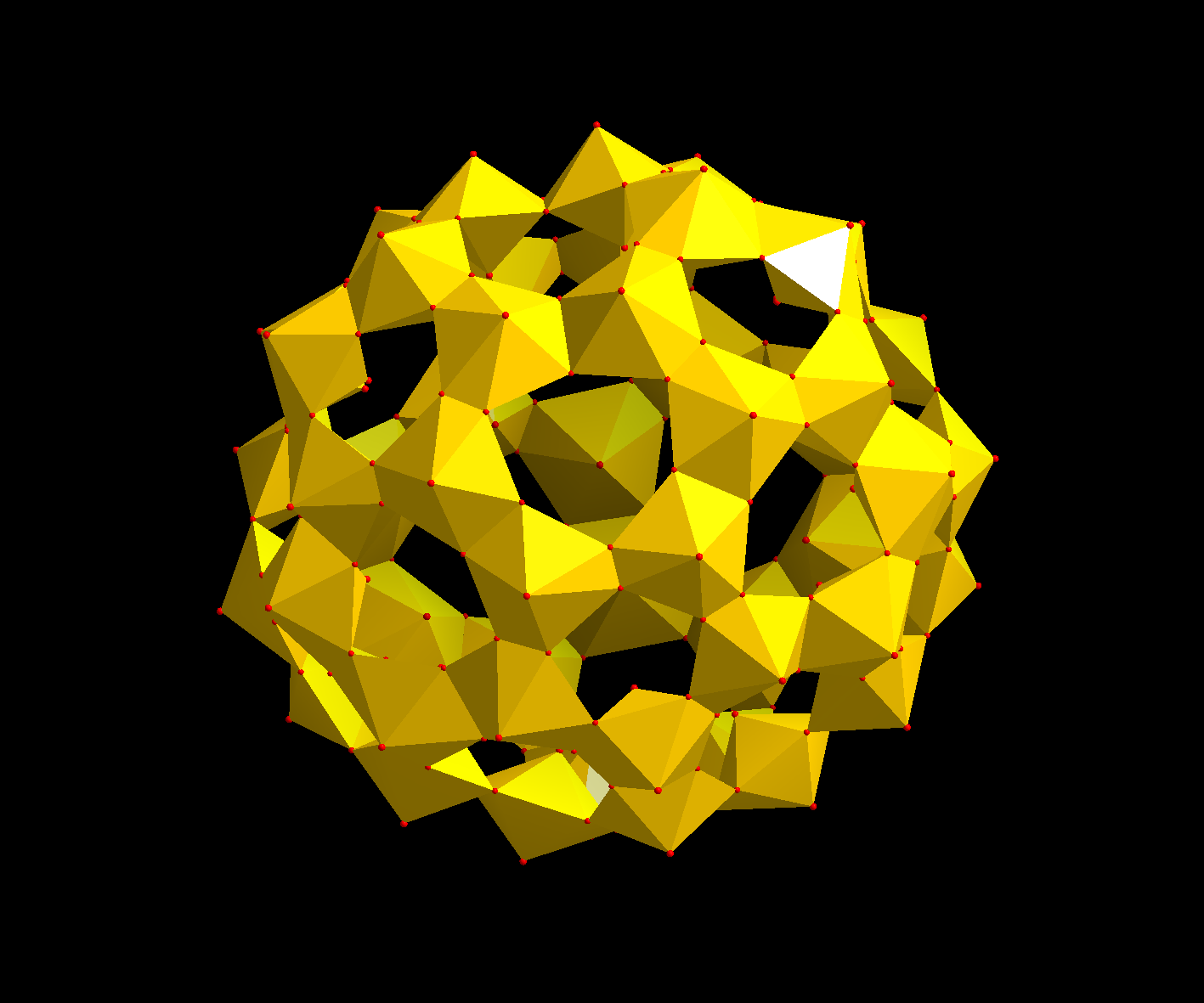
A 50-uranium-atom peroxouranate cluster

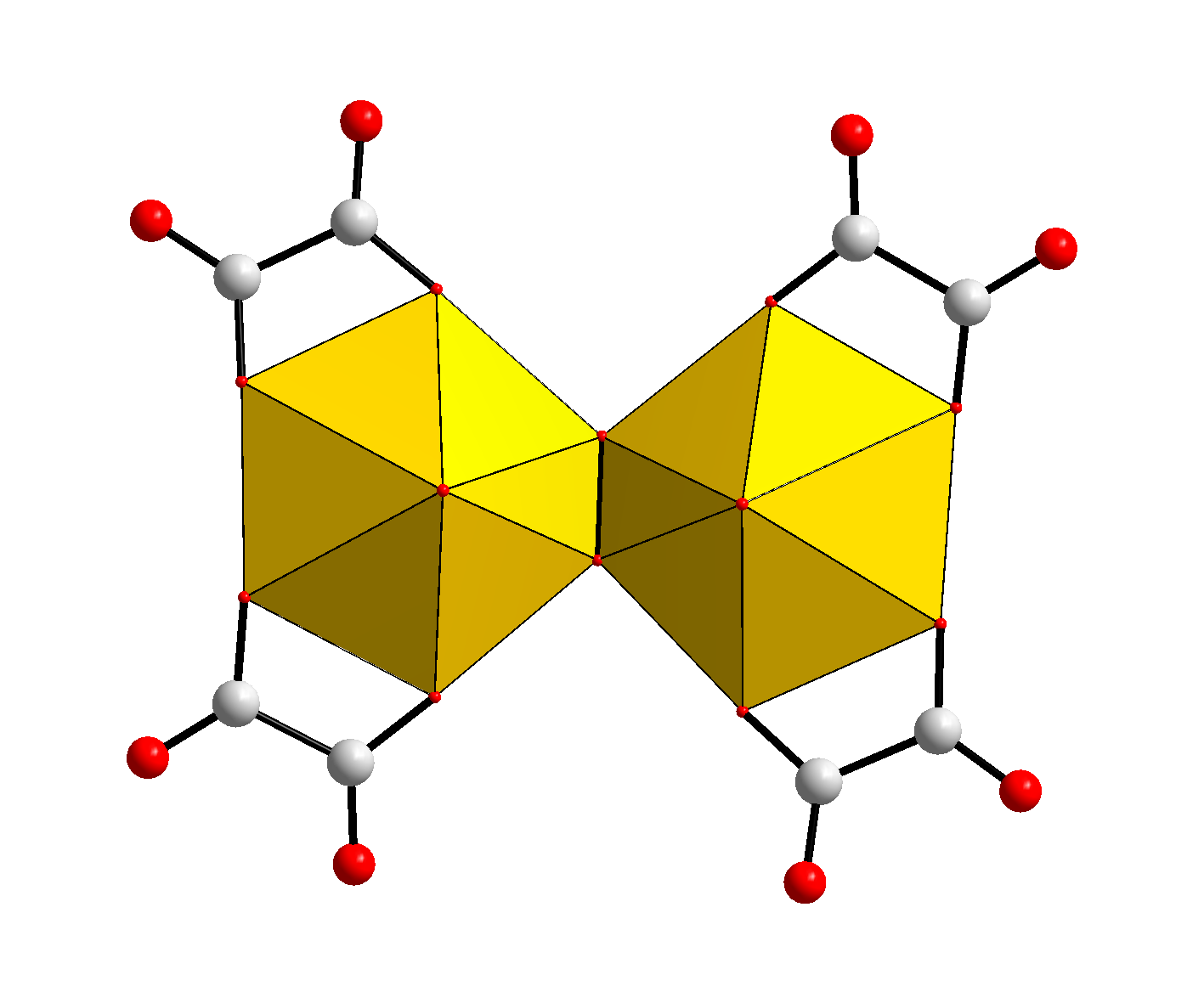
Peroxide-bridged uranyl dimers in K_{6}(H_{2}O)_{4}[(UO_{2})_{2}(O_{2})(C_{2}O_{4})_{4}]

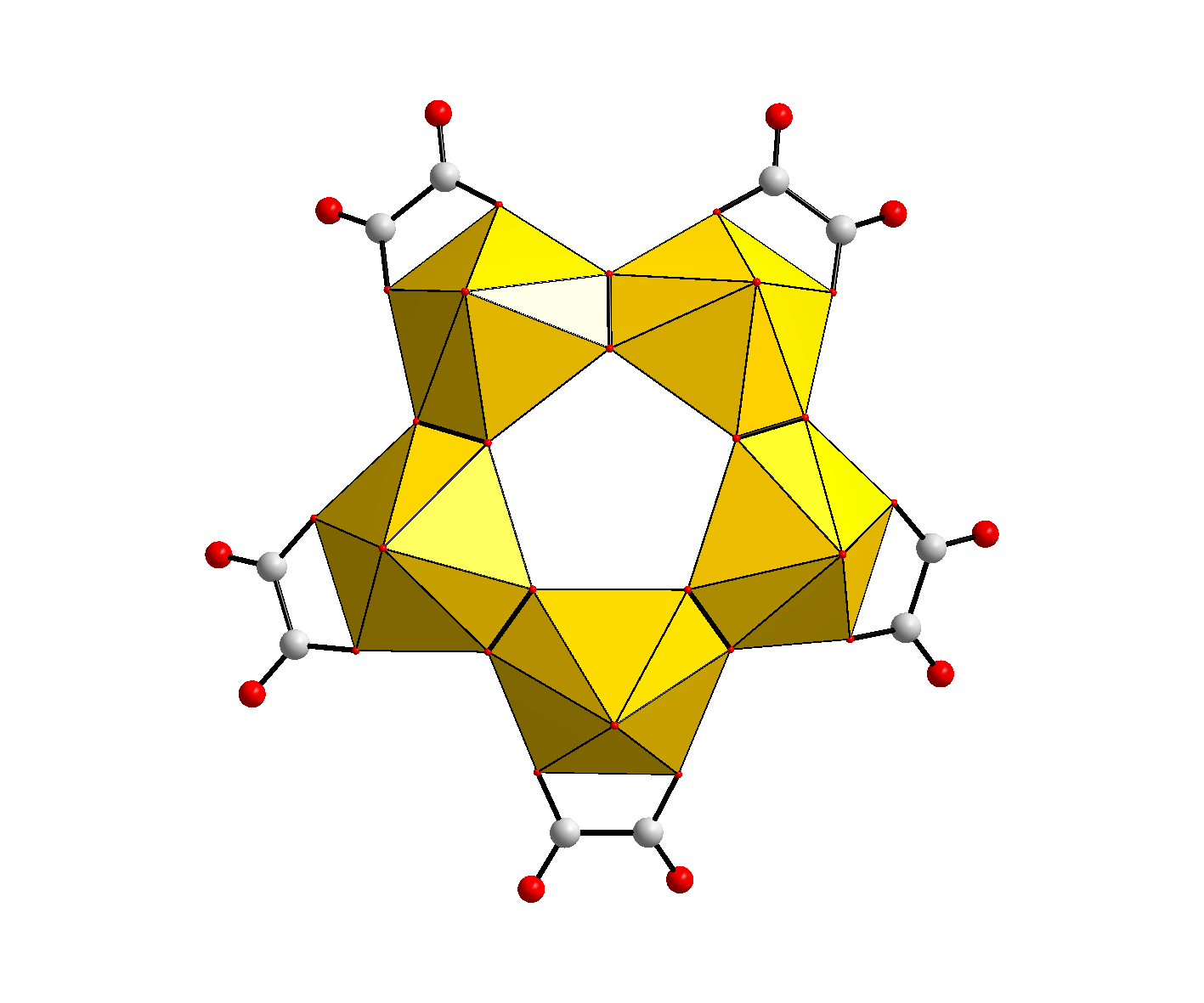
Pentagonal oxaloperoxouranates in K_{10}[(UO_{2})(C_{2}O_{4})]_{5}(H_{2}O)_{13}

== Applications ==
Radiolysis of uranium salts dissolved in water produces peroxides; uranyl peroxide has been studied as a possible end component of spent radioactive waste.
