= Materials Testing Reactor =

Early nuclear reactor that provided essential research for future reactors

Materials Testing Reactor (MTR)
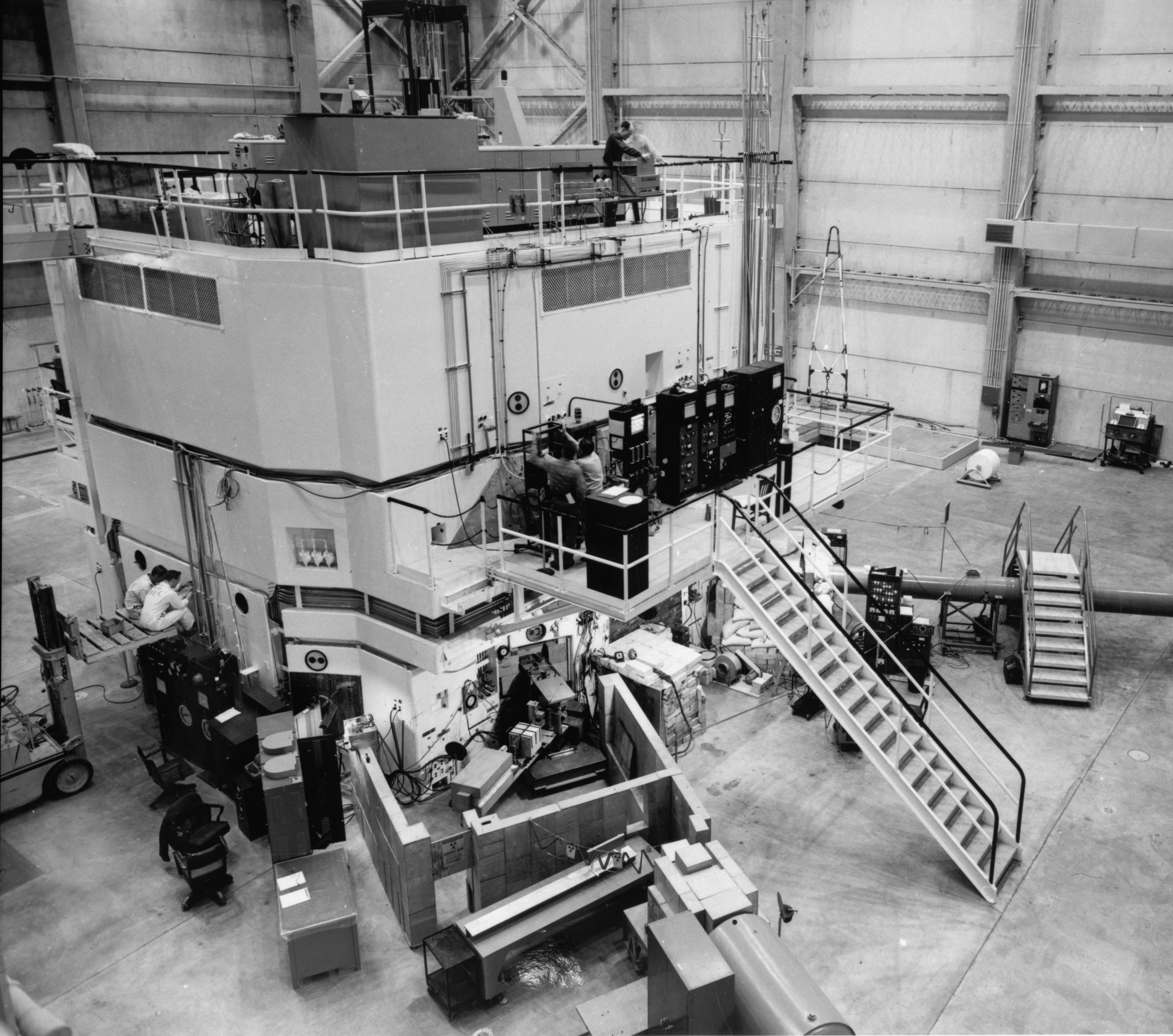
- Early reactor that provided foundational information supporting the nuclear industry
- Generation: 1
- Reactor concept: Light water reactor
- Status: Decommissioned
- Location: National Reactor Testing Station, Idaho
- Coordinates: 43°35′10″N 112°57′46″W

Main parameters of the reactor core
- Fuel (fissile material): ^{235}U
- Fuel state: U-Al plates
- Neutron energy spectrum: Thermal
- Primary control method: Cadmium
- Primary moderator: Light water
- Primary coolant: Water

Reactor usage
- Primary use: Power reactor research, radioisotope production
- Power (thermal): 40 MWt
- Criticality (date): March 31, 1952
- Operator/owner: Phillips Petroleum Company

The Materials Testing Reactor (MTR) was an early nuclear reactor specifically designed to facilitate the conception and the design of future reactors. It produced much of the foundational irradiation data that underlies the nuclear power industry. It operated in Idaho at the National Reactor Testing Station from 1952 to 1970 and was fully decommissioned in 2011.

== Design and administrative history ==
The design evolution for MTR began in 1944 at Clinton Laboratories (now Oak Ridge National Laboratory), originally for the production of fission products. The concept evolved from a 50-kW homogeneous reactor to a heavy-water-cooled and moderated core, and then again at the suggestion of Eugene Wigner to a 30 MW light-water-cooled and moderated core.

A full-scale mock-up of the reactor at Oak Ridge called the Low-Intensity Test Reactor was built to verify the design, but the Atomic Energy Commission announced on December 27, 1947, that all reactor development would be centralized at the Argonne National Laboratory (ANL). A directive was issued to ANL to proceed with the MTR project in November 1948. Concerns were raised by the AEC Safeguard Committee regarding potential large fission product release due to the reactor's high power with respect to a proposed site at ANL, and so the reactor site was moved to the new Reactor Testing Station near Arco, Idaho.

The Blaw-Knox Company was selected as the architect-engineer in July 1949 to complete the engineering design. Fluor was engaged in February 1950 as the construction contractor. Ground was broken for the MTR in May 1950, and construction was completed in February 1952. The first experimental tests were inserted in the reactor on August 2, 1952.

== The reactor ==
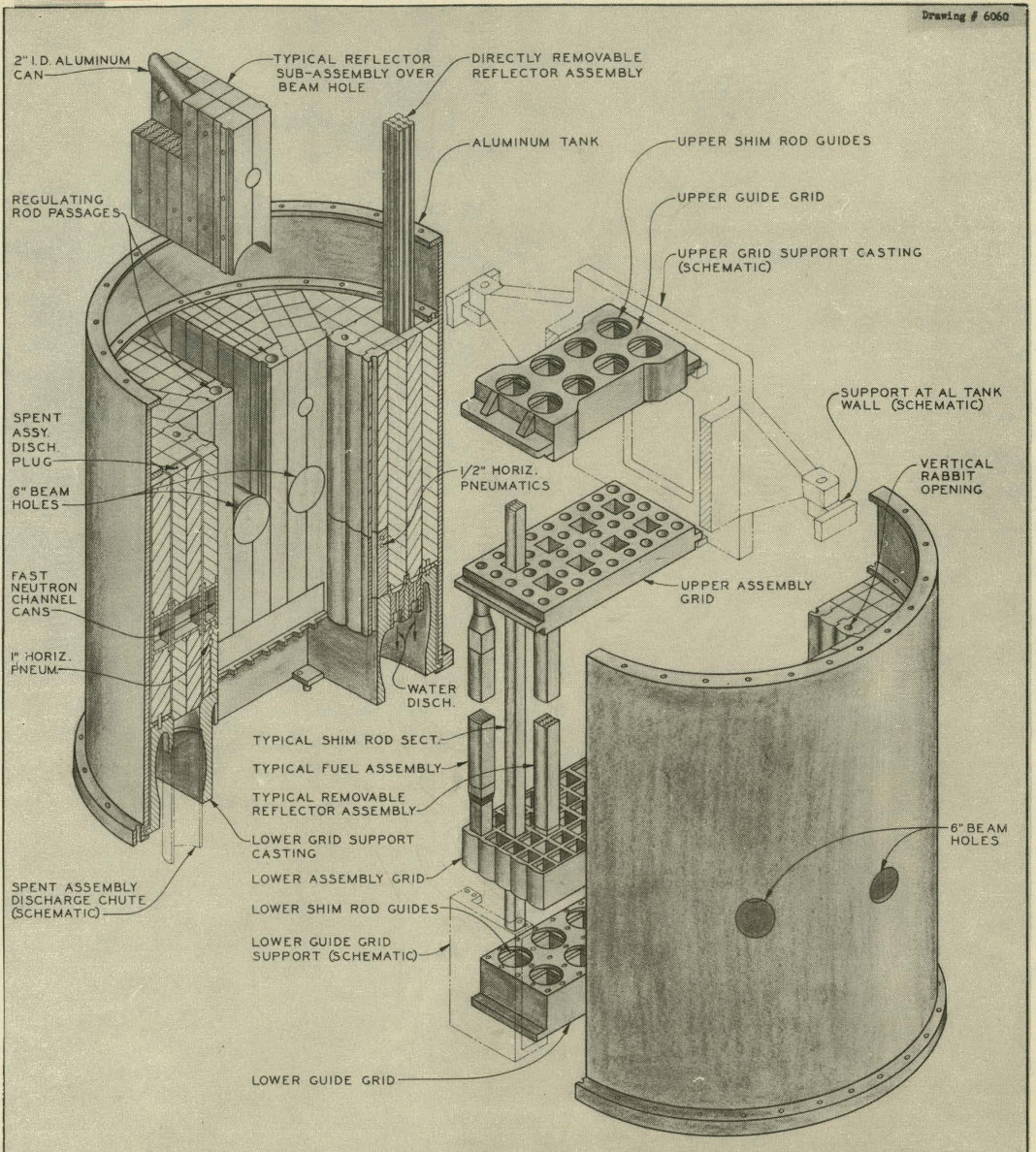
Pictorial cross section of the Materials Testing Reactor Tank

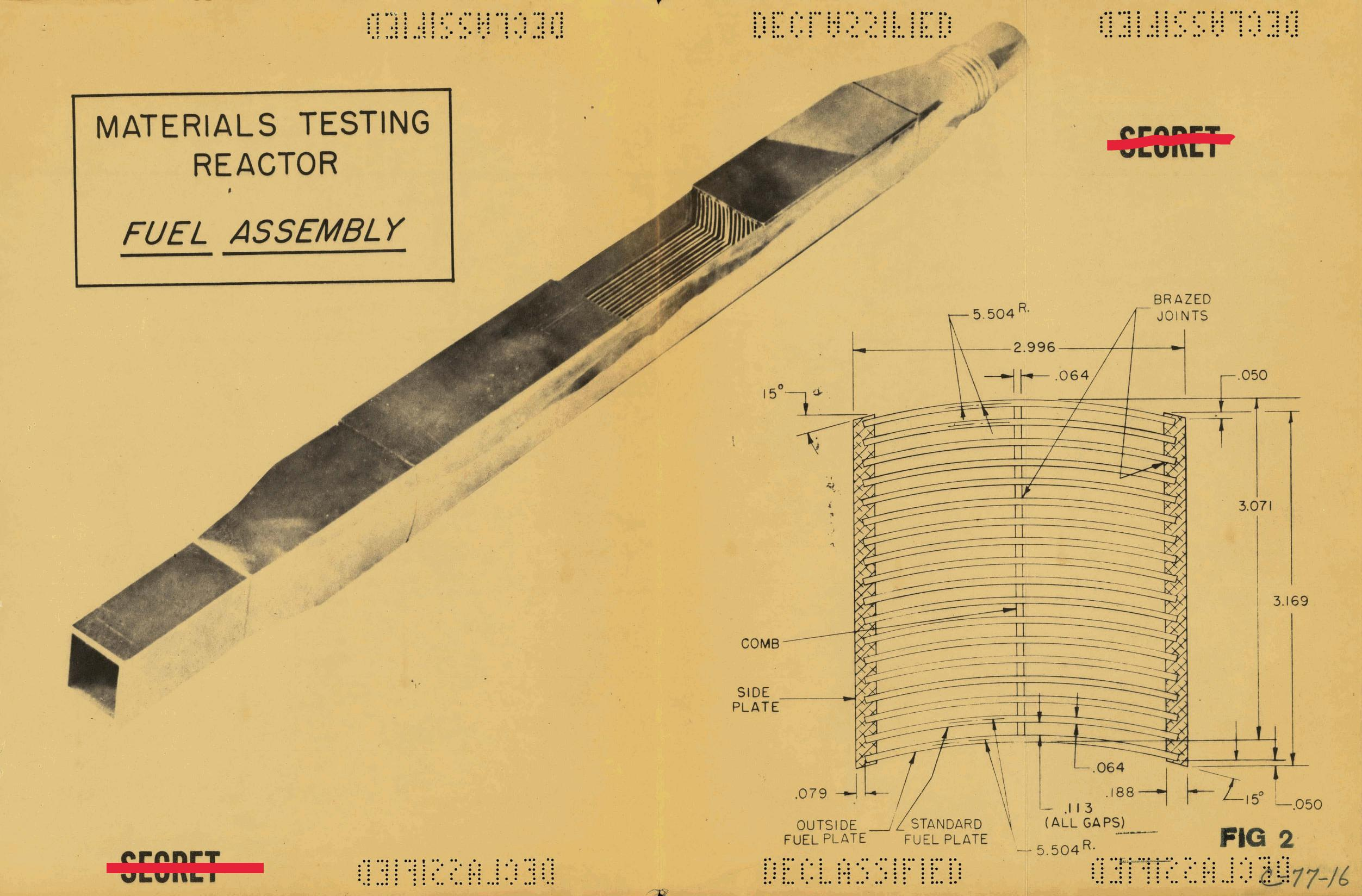
The fuel assembly from the Materials Testing Reactor

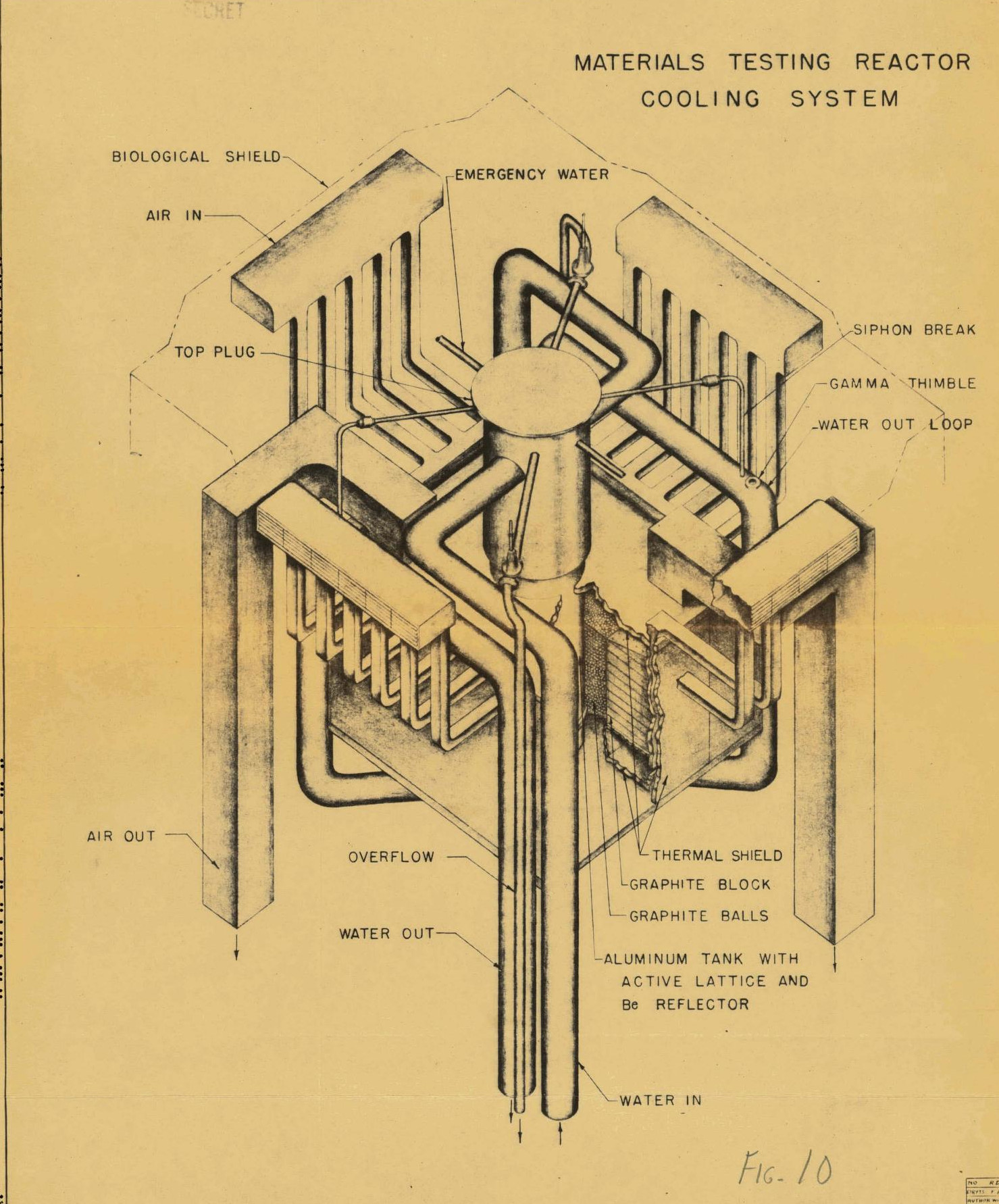
The cooling circuits used in the MTR

The reactor had a highly enriched uranium core made of metallic plate-type uranium-aluminum fuel clad in aluminum. Eighteen plates of fuel were constructed into fuel assemblies. The core ran with between 21 and 23 assemblies. The reactor was cooled and moderated with water pumped through the fuel elements.

The core was surrounded by a beryllium neutron reflector held in an aluminum tank. Outside the tank was a space filled with graphite balls, and then block graphite. The graphite served to thermalize and reflect neutrons back into the core and to contain thermalized neutrons in a zone large enough to allow the placement of numerous experimental facilities. A thermal shield made of steel surrounded the graphite, and a 9-foot thick concrete biological shield surrounded that.

The graphite was cooled with forced air flow. This air became activated by the neutrons and included about 1500 Ci of Argon-41 per day, which was exhausted through the 250-ft stack located downwind of the reactor.

The reactor, the control room, the experimental facilities, and a fuel management canal were enclosed in a reactor building

The neutron flux was about 2e14 thermal (in the reflector) and 1e14 fast (E > 1 MeV).

About 25% of the uranium in each assembly was consumed before needing removal. Assemblies were cut in the reactor canal using an underwater saw in preparation for transport to the chemical separation process to reclaim the unused uranium.

== Experimental facilities ==
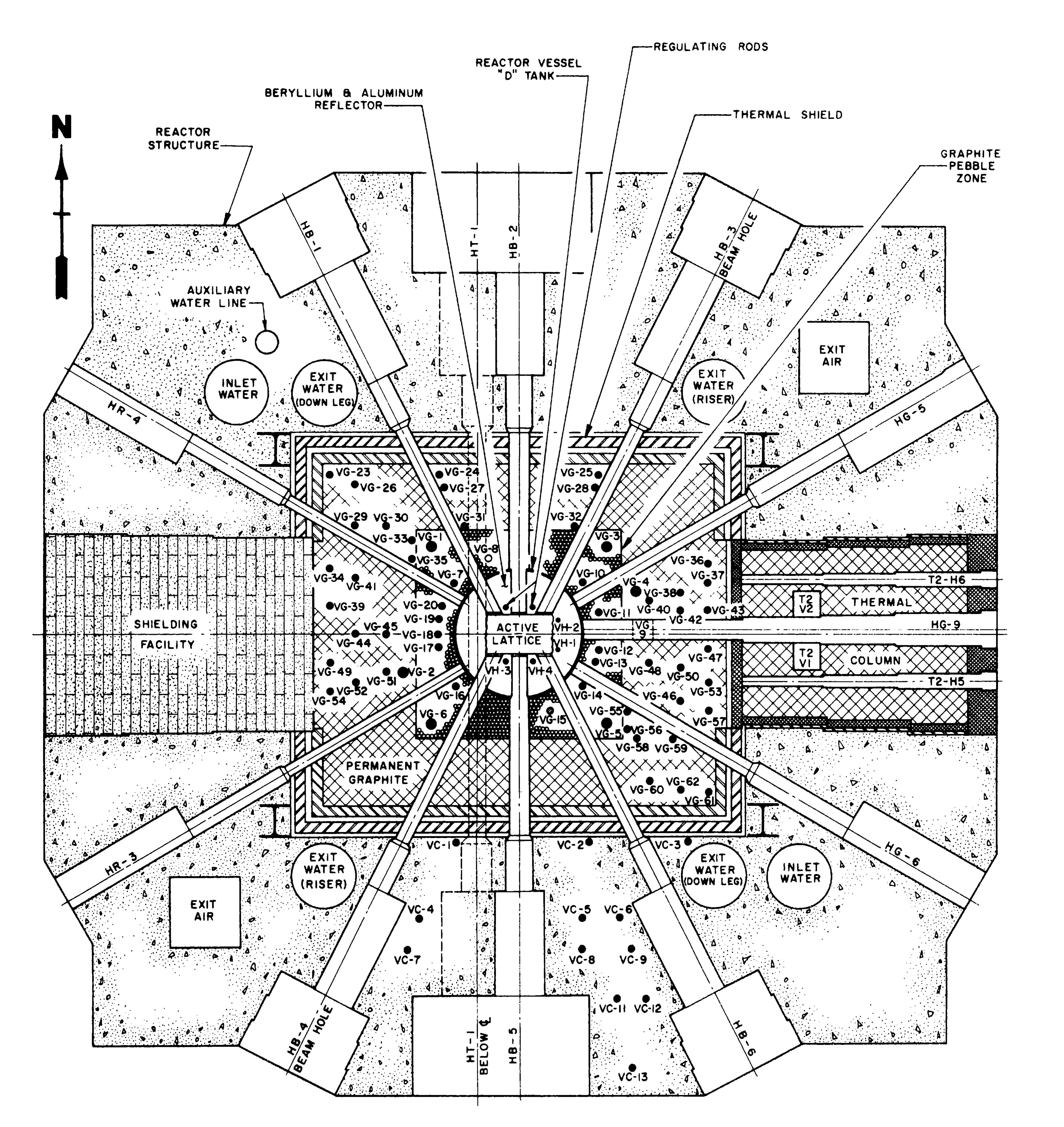
Many of the experimental facilities built into the Materials Testing Reactor

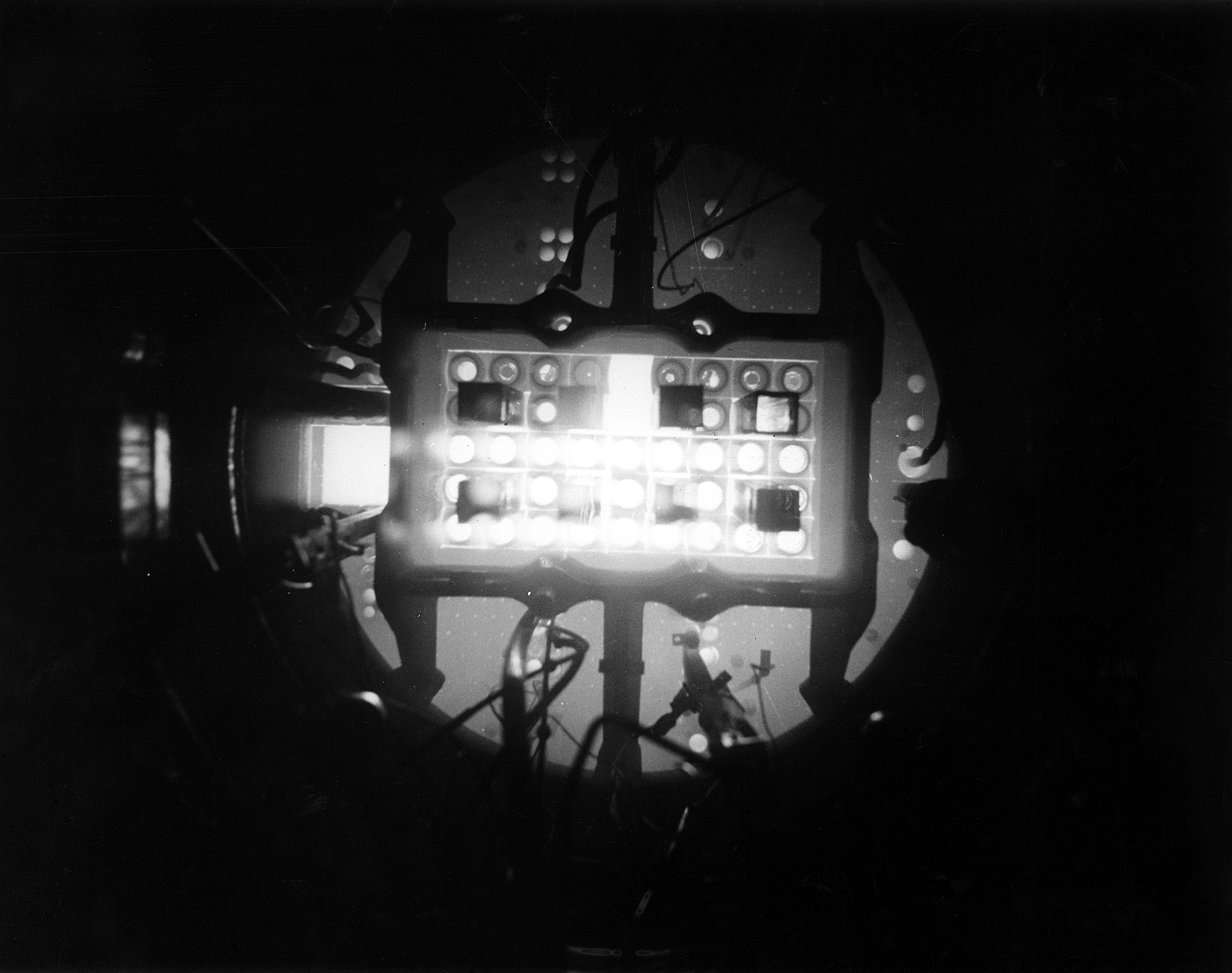
A view of the MTR core from the top of the tank

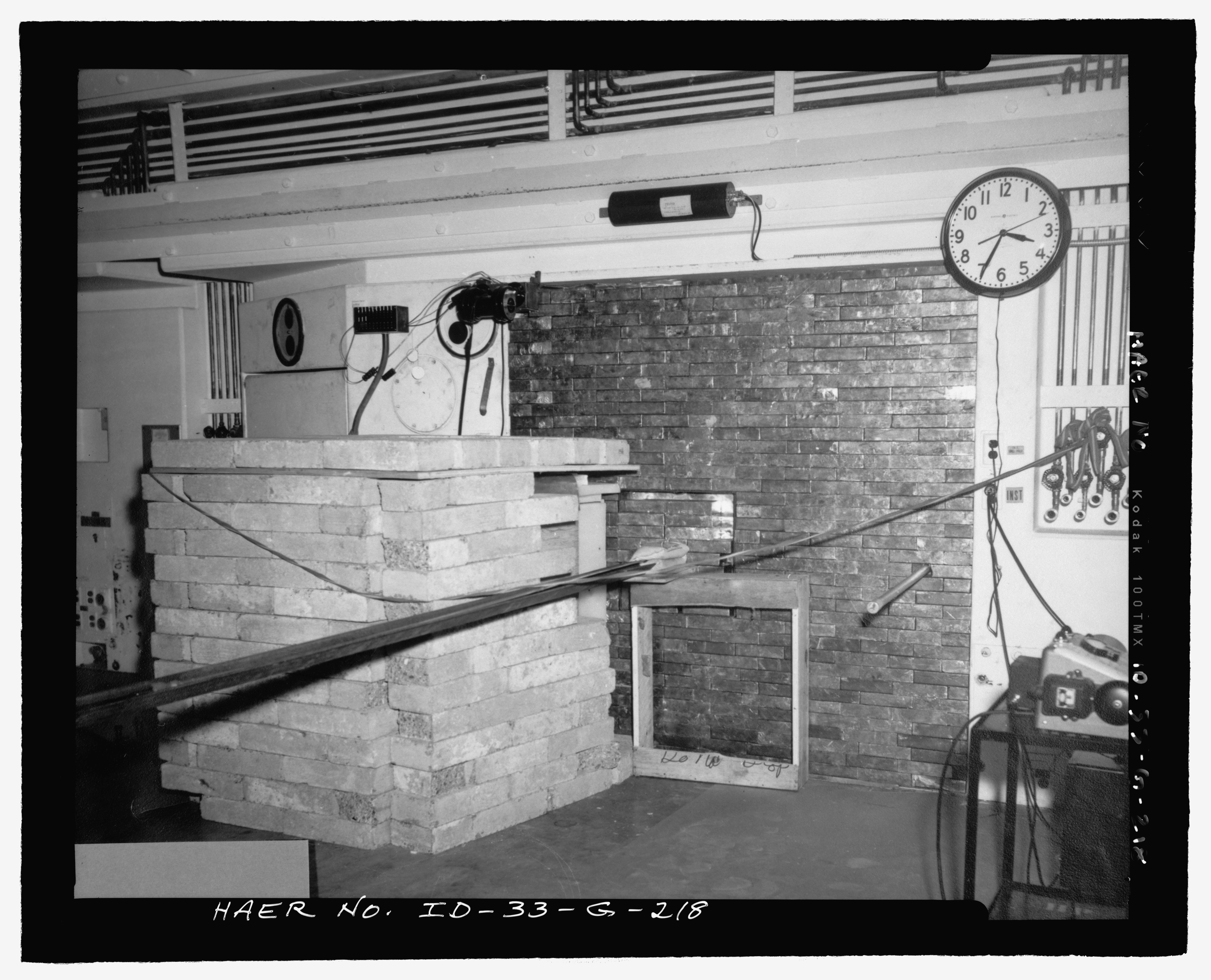
South face of MTR

A wide variety of experimental facilities were included in the MTR.

Six Horizontal Beam Holes with 6-inch diameter were placed directly adjacent to the active core. Primarily, materials were places in the beam hole tips for irradiation testing, but these facilities could also be used as neutron beam sources. The HB-6 horizontal beam hole was equipped with a neutron chopper for velocity selection needed during measurements of nuclear cross sections. A crystal spectrometer, a neutron velocity selector, a cold neutron facility, and other equipment was used with the horizontal beam holes.

Six Down Beam Holes provided space for additional removable material samples to be placed near the core.

Vertical Graphite Holes were positioned vertically in the graphite reflector to position samples in thermal neutron fields.

A Thermal Column Facility composed of a 6 ft square column of graphite extending from the outer face to the biological shield to the outer face of the outer thermal shield plate had many holes with lower neutron and gamma radiation levels than the interior positions.

A Hydraulic Rabbit device capable of inserting and removing small samples into and out of the reactor was located in an extension of the main canal below the reactor. The system had 4 tubes. A similar Pneumatic Rabbit facility driven by compressed air provided rabbit services to the beryllium reflector.

Irradiation positions directly adjacent to the fuel assemblies were available through the Active Lattice Facilities. Material placed in these positions was cooled by the primary water coolant.

A Bulk Shielding Facility was designed to be located on the west side of the reactor for studying reactor shielding materials but was filled with high density concrete due to construction economy considerations.

== Contributions and legacy ==
Once operational, the MTR was constantly in high demand. It tested different candidate fuel forms for the US nuclear naval propulsion program, the proposed nuclear-powered bomber, reactors at the AEC's Savannah River weapons plant, and for prototype power reactors under development.

By 1970, MTR had performed over 15,000 irradiation experiments.

The high flux of MTR was ideal for generating significant amounts of transplutonium nuclides, such as Californium-252. MTR generated 30 micrograms of Cf-252 between 1952 and 1958.

== See also ==
- Advanced Test Reactor, a research reactor at the Idaho National Laboratory
