= AETR =

AETR may refer to:

- Advanced Engineering Test Reactor
- Advanced Epithermal Thorium Reactor
- Accord Européen sur les Transports Routiers, the European Agreement Concerning the Work of Crews of Vehicles Engaged in International Road Transport
