= Advanced Test Reactor =

Idaho National Laboratory research neutron source

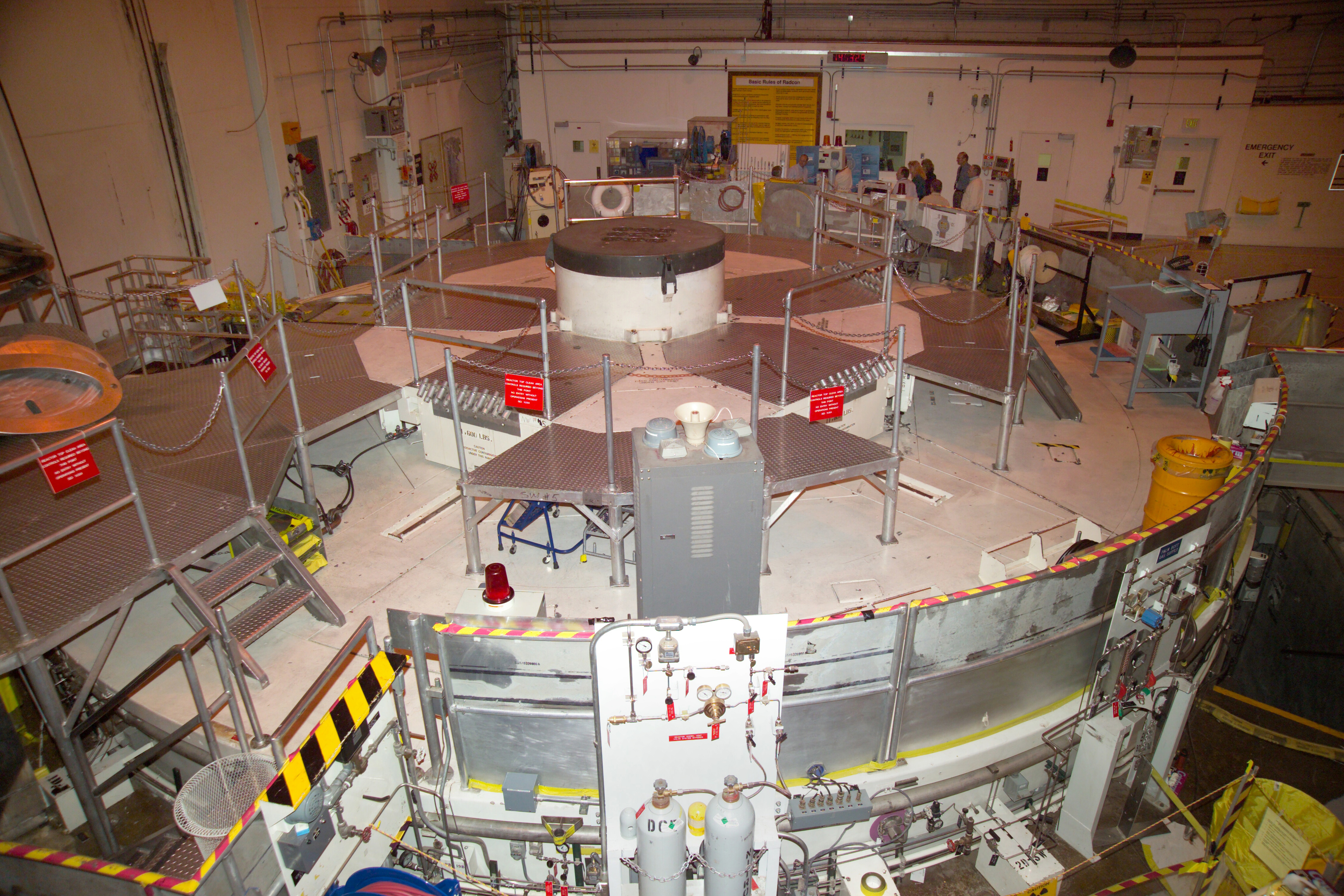
- Advanced Test Reactor

- Idaho National Laboratory
- Operating institution: Idaho National Laboratory
- Location: Butte County, near Arco, Idaho, United States
- Coordinates: 43.585833°N 112.965278°W
- Power: 250 MW(t)

Construction and upkeep
- Construction began: 1967

Technical specifications
- Max thermal flux: 10^{15} s^{−1} cm^{−2}
- Max fast flux: 5·10^{14} s^{−1} cm^{−2}
- Cooling: Light water
- Neutron moderator: Light water
- Neutron reflector: Beryllium
- Cladding material: Stainless steel and concrete

The Advanced Test Reactor (ATR) is a research reactor at the Idaho National Laboratory, located east of Arco, Idaho. This reactor was designed and is used to test nuclear fuels and materials to be used in power plants, naval propulsion, research and advanced reactors. It can operate at a maximum thermal power of 250 MW and has a "Four Leaf Clover" core design (similar to the Camunian rose) that allows for a variety of testing locations. The unique design allows for different neutron flux (number of neutrons impacting one square centimeter every second) conditions in various locations. Six of the test locations allow an experiment to be isolated from the primary cooling system, providing its own environment for temperature, pressure, flow and chemistry, replicating the physical environment while accelerating the nuclear conditions.

The ATR is a pressurized light water reactor (LWR), using water as both coolant and moderator. The core is surrounded by a beryllium neutron reflector to concentrate neutrons on experiments, and houses multiple experiment positions as well. It operates at low temperature and pressure 71 °C (160 °F) and up to 2.69 MPa water pressure. The ATR reactor vessel is solid stainless steel, 35 feet (11 m) tall by 12 feet (3.7 m) across. The core is approximately 4 feet (1.2 m) tall by 4 feet (1.2 m) across.

In addition to its role in nuclear fuels and materials irradiation, the ATR is the United States' only domestic source of high specific activity (HSA) cobalt-60 (^{60}Co) for medical applications. HSA ^{60}Co is used primarily in gamma knife treatment of brain cancer. Other medical and industrial isotopes have also been produced, and could be again, including plutonium-238 (^{238}Pu), which is useful for powering spacecraft.

== History ==
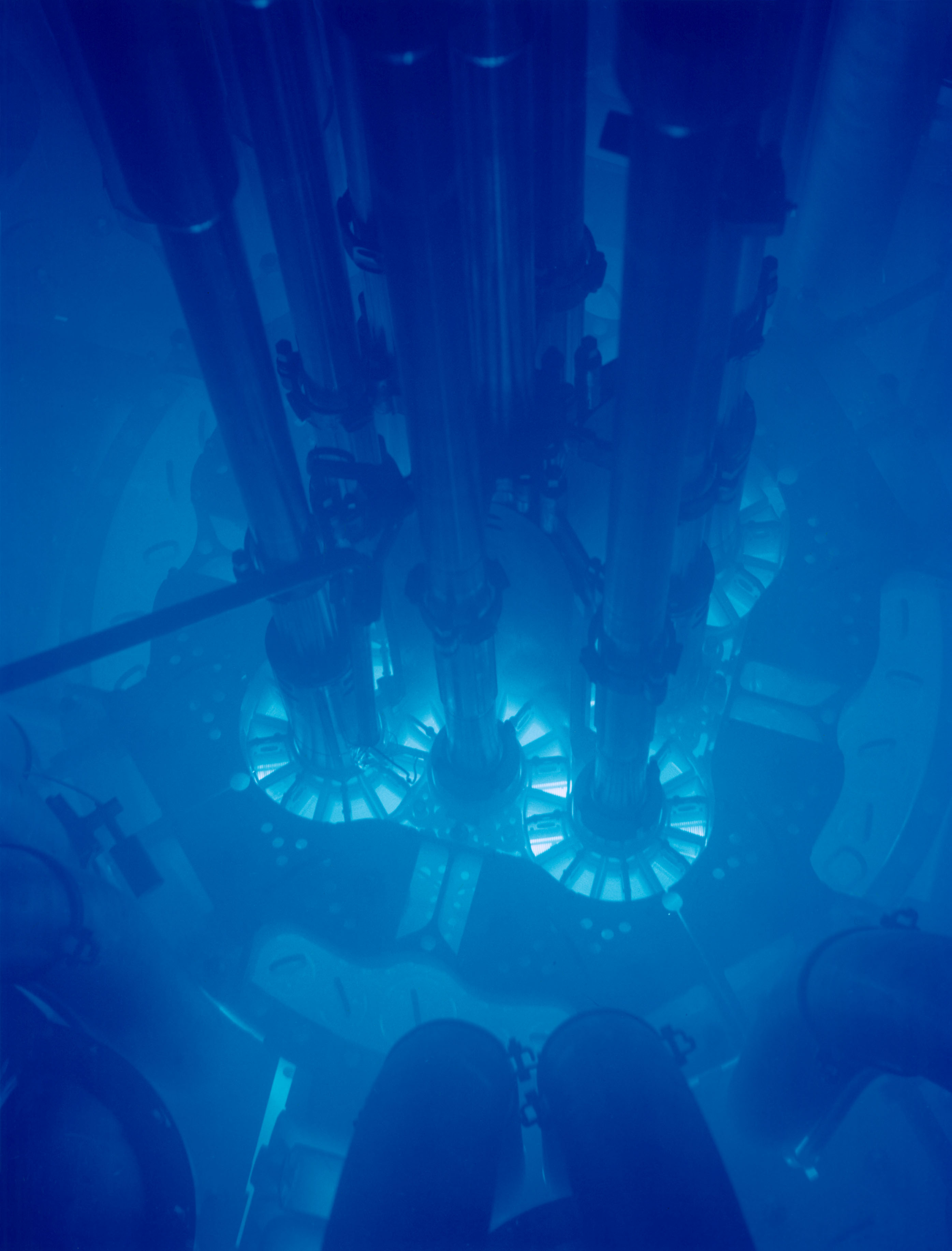
ATR core, powered up. The serpentine arrangement of fuel plates can be seen glowing bright blue. This is due to Cherenkov radiation, which emits photons in the blue and ultraviolet range.

Since 1951, fifty-two reactors have been built on the grounds of what was originally the Atomic Energy Commission's National Reactor Testing Station, currently the location of the U.S. Department of Energy's Idaho National Laboratory (INL). Constructed in 1967, the ATR is the second-oldest of three reactors still in operation at the site. Its primary function is to intensely bombard samples of materials and fuels with neutrons to replicate long-term exposure to high levels of radiation, as would be present after years in a commercial nuclear reactor. The ATR is one of only four test reactors in the world with this capability. The reactor also produces rare isotopes for use in medicine and industry.

== National Scientific User Facility ==
In April 2007, the ATR was designated a National Scientific User Facility, since renamed a Nuclear Science User Facility (NSUF), to encourage use of the reactor by universities, laboratories, and industry. This status is intended to stimulate experiments to extend the life of existing commercial reactors and encourage nuclear power development. These experiments will test "materials, nuclear fuel, and instruments that operate in the reactors." Under this program, experimenters will not have to pay to perform experiments at the reactor, but are required to publish their findings. Through the NSUF system, ATR and partner facilities have hosted 213 awarded experiments from 42 different institutions (universities, national labs and industry), resulting in 178 publications and presentations.

== ATR compared with commercial reactors ==
Test reactors are very different in appearance and design from commercial, nuclear power reactors. Commercial reactors are large, operate at high temperature and pressure, and require a large amount of nuclear fuel. A typical commercial reactor has a volume of 48 cubic metres (1,700 cu ft) with 5,400 kilograms (11,900 lb) of uranium at 288 °C (550 °F) and 177 atm. Because of their large size and stored energy, commercial reactors require a robust "containment structure" to prevent the release of radioactive material in the event of an emergency situation.

By contrast, the ATR requires a smaller containment structure—it has a volume of 1.4 cubic metres (49 cu ft), contains 43 kilograms (95 lb) of uranium, and operates at 60 °C (140 °F) and 26.5 atm (conditions similar to a water heater). The reactor vessel itself, which is made of stainless steel surrounded by concrete that extends more than 20 feet (6.1 m) underground, is hardened against accidental or intentional damage. The entire reactor area is also surrounded by a confinement structure (as opposed to a "containment structure") designed to further protect the surrounding environment from any potential release of radioactivity.

== Reactor design and experimental capabilities ==
The ATR core is designed to be as flexible as possible for research needs. It can be brought online and powered down safely as often as necessary to change experiments or perform maintenance. The reactor is also powered down automatically in the event of abnormal experimental conditions or power failure.

Components of the reactor core are replaced every 7–10 years to prevent fatigue due to exposure to radiation and to ensure experimenters always have a new reactor to work with. The neutron flux provided by the reactor can be either constant or variable, and each lobe of the four-leaf-clover design can be controlled independently to produce up to 10^{15} thermal neutrons per second per square centimeter or 5·10^{14} fast neutrons s^{−1} cm^{−2}. There are 77 different testing locations inside the reflector and another 34 low-intensity locations outside the core, allowing many experiments to run simultaneously in different test environments. Test volumes up to 5.0 inches (130 mm) in diameter and 4 feet (1.2 m) long can be accommodated. Experiments are changed on average every seven weeks, and the reactor is in nominal operation (110 MW) 75% of the year.

Three types of experiments can be performed in the reactor:

1. Static Capsule Experiment: The material to be tested is placed in a sealed tube made of aluminium, stainless steel, or zircaloy, which is then inserted in the desired reactor location. If the tube is less than the full 48-inch reactor height, several capsules may be stacked. In some cases, it is desirable to test materials (such as fuel elements) in direct contact with the reactor coolant, in which case, the test capsule is not sealed. Very limited monitoring and temperature control are available for the static capsule configuration, and any instances would have to be built into the capsule experiment (such as temperature melt wires or an insulating air gap).
2. Instrumented Lead Experiment: Similar to the Static Capsule configuration, this type of experiment allows for real-time monitoring of temperature and gas conditions inside the capsule. An umbilical connects the test capsule to a control station to report test conditions. The control station automatically regulates the temperature inside the test capsule as desired by pumping a combination of helium (conducting) and neon or argon (nonconducting) gases through the capsule. The circulated gas can be examined though gas-liquid chromatography to test for failure or oxidation of the material being tested.
3. Pressurized Water Loop Experiment: More complex than the Instrumented Lead configuration, this type of experiment is available in only six of the nine flux tubes, referred to as Inpile Tubes (IPTs). Test material is isolated from the primary ATR coolant by a secondary coolant system, allowing for precise conditions of a commercial or naval reactor to be simulated. Extensive instrumentation and control systems in this type of experiment generate a large amount of data, which is available to the experimenter in real-time so that changes can be made to the experiment as required.

Research experiments at the reactor include:

- Advanced Graphite Capsule: This experiment will test the effects of radiation on several types of graphite under consideration for the Next Generation Nuclear Plant program that currently have no high-flux temperature data available.
- Advanced Fuel Cycle Initiative / Light Water Reactor: The goal of the AFCI is to transmute longer-life fuels into shorter-life ones which would be able to be used in commercial light water reactors, to reduce the amount of waste that must be stored while increasing the fuel available for commercial reactors.
- Cobalt-60 Production: The least complex of current uses of the Advanced Test Reactor is the production of the ^{60}Co radioisotope for medical uses. Disks of cobalt-59 1 mm -diameter by 1 mm thick are inserted into the reactor (Static Capsule Experiment), which bombards the sample with neutrons, producing cobalt-60. Approximately 200 kilocuries (7,400 TBq) are produced per year, entirely for medical uses.

== Advanced Test Reactor Critical ==
The Advanced Test Reactor Critical (ATRC) performs functions for the ATR similar to those of the ARMF reactors in relation to the MTR. It was a valuable auxiliary tool in operation for three years before the ATR started up. It verified for reactor designers the effectiveness of control mechanisms and physicists predictions of power distribution in the large core of the ATR . Low-power testing in the ATRC conserved valuable time so that the large ATR could irradiate experiments at high power levels. The ATRC is also used to verify the safety of a proposed experiment before it is placed in the ATR. The ATRC started operating on May 19, 1964, and remains in service.
