= Nuclear fuel =

Material fuelling nuclear reactors

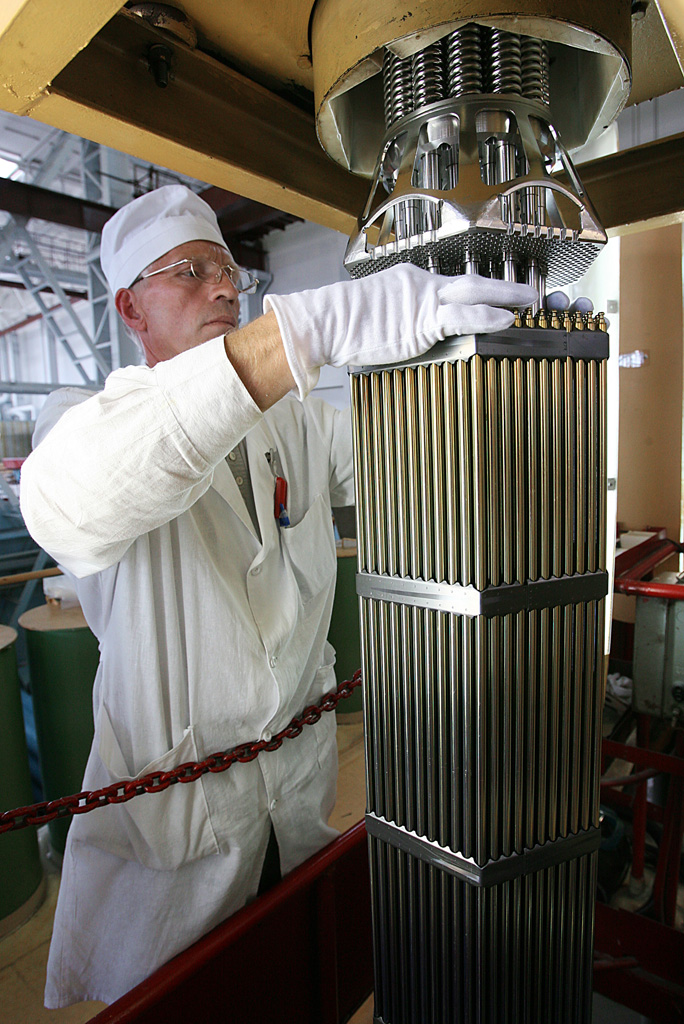
A fuel assembly for a Russian VVER nuclear power plant

Nuclear fuel is any substance which is used by nuclear reactors or other nuclear devices as fuel to generate energy. Nuclear fuel contains fissile material, such as uranium, which undergoes nuclear fission in a reactor. The heat energy released by the fission of nuclear fuel can be converted into electricity in a nuclear power station.

Unlike chemical fuels, which release energy via a chemical reaction, nuclear fuels release energy via a nuclear reaction, and have much higher energy density than chemical fuels. The energy released by the fission of one uranium-235 atom is about 100 million times greater than the energy released by burning one carbon atom in air to produce CO_{2}. A single uranium fuel pellet used in a light-water reactor produces more heat than burning one ton of coal.

== Composition ==
Nuclear fuel used in fission reactors requires a fissile material, which can undergo a fission chain reaction driven by neutrons. Uranium-235 is the only naturally-occurring fissile isotope, found mixed with uranium-238 in natural uranium. The only other two fissile materials used as fuel are plutonium-239 and uranium-233, which are obtained through nuclear transmutation from uranium-238 and thorium-232, respectively.

Nuclear fuel can also contain fertile materials, such as ^{238}U or thorium, which can be converted into fissile material when it absorbs a neutron. A breeder reactor is a reactor that uses a fertile material to produce more fissile material than it consumes. Some reactors incorporate a fissile "seed" surrounded by a "blanket" of elements containing only fertile material called blanket fuel. Fuel elements that do contain fissile material, and thus drive the fission reaction, are called driver fuel.

The primary fuel for nuclear reactors is uranium. Pure uranium metal can be used, as well as many different uranium compounds such as oxides, alloys, nitride, or carbide. The most common fuel is uranium dioxide (UO_{2}), typically enriched to 3–5% uranium-235. Some reactors can also use natural (unenriched) uranium.

== Production ==
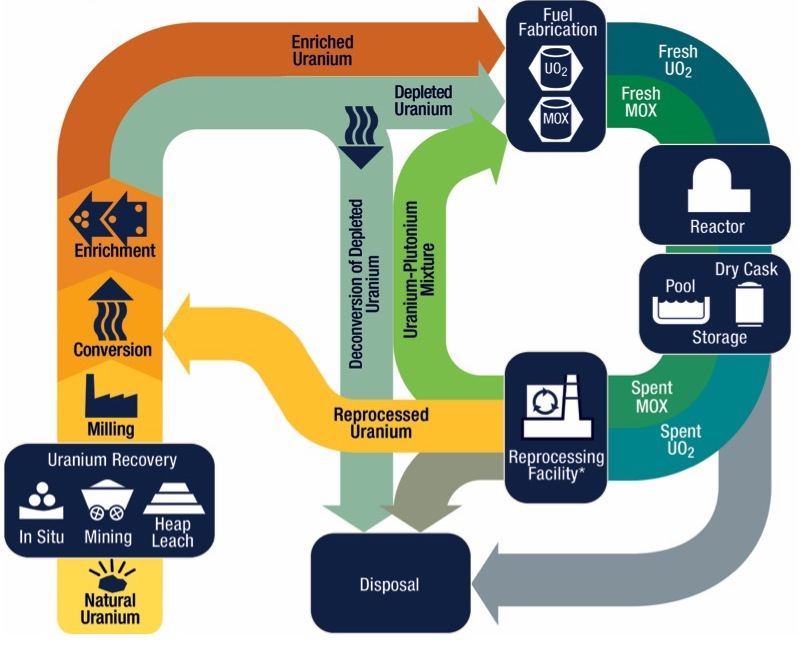
The nuclear fuel cycle describes how nuclear fuel is produced, used, and disposed of

Uranium is the only naturally-occurring fissile material on Earth. However, the fissile isotope ^{235}U is present only in small quantity (0.7% of natural uranium). To make nuclear fuel, uranium is mined as ore, converted into uranium hexafluoride, and enriched to increase the amount of ^{235}U present. The enriched uranium is then converted into oxide or metal form and fabricated into fuel elements. These fuel elements are finally packaged in cladding and shipped to a nuclear power plant for use.

Spent nuclear fuel contains residual fissile and fertile material, as well as bred fissile isotopes such as ^{239}Pu or ^{233}U. These potential fuel materials can be reprocessed into new nuclear fuel and used in a power plant, or can be disposed of as radioactive waste. The entire process of production, use, and recycling or disposal is known as the nuclear fuel cycle.

== Oxide fuel ==
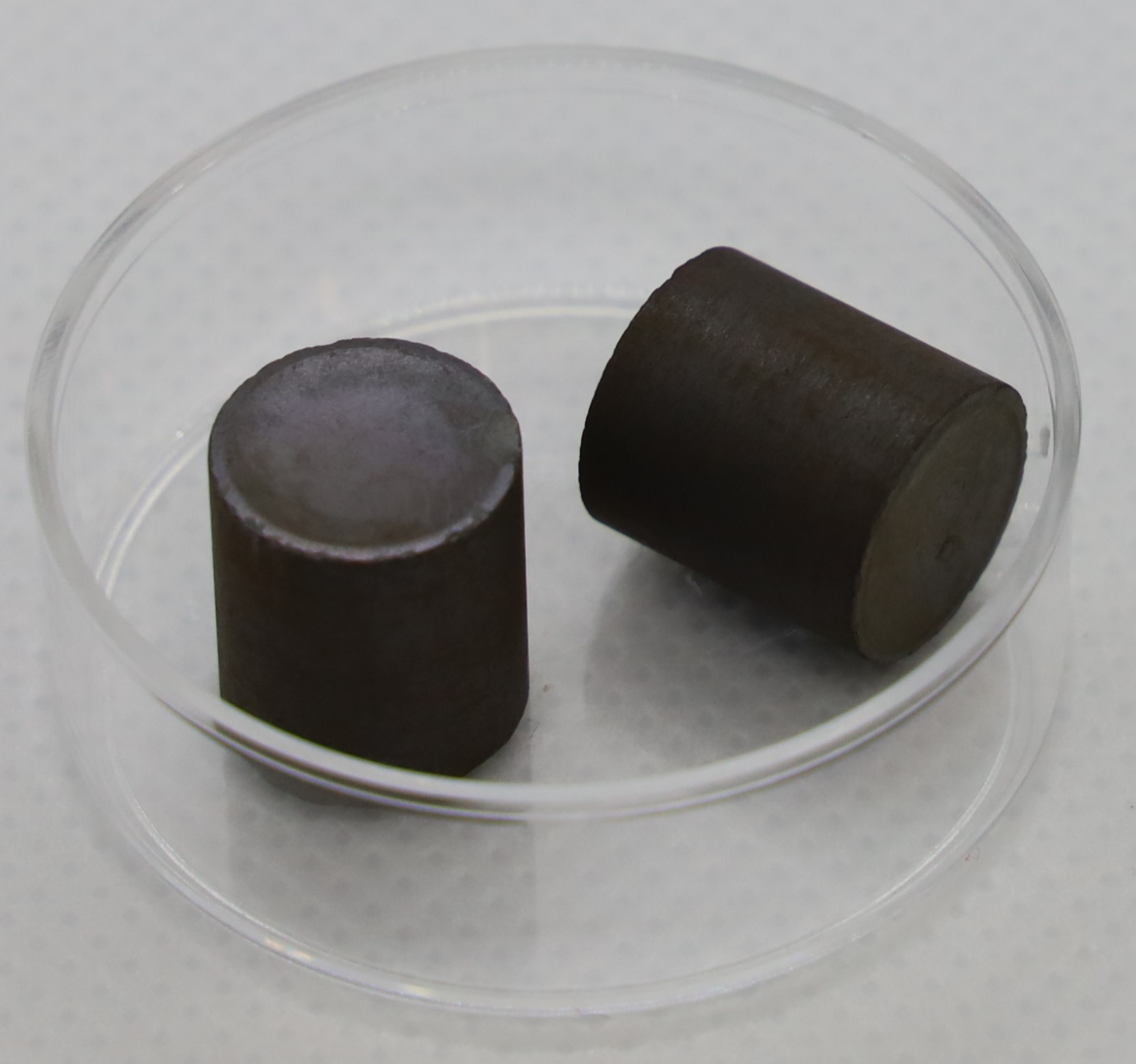
Uranium dioxide fuel pellets are the most common nuclear fuel worldwide

Ceramic metal oxide pellets, typically uranium dioxide, are the standard fuel for almost all reactors worldwide. Light water reactors (LWRs) use low-enriched uranium dioxide, while pressurized heavy-water reactors use natural uranium dioxide. Metal oxides have been the most successful power reactor fuels. In 2019, all commercial nuclear power reactors used oxide fuels.

One major advantage of oxide fuels is their high melting temperatures. Oxide fuels have excellent chemical stability, and exist in a single phase over a broad composition and temperature regime. They are also effective at retaining fission products during operation. Oxide fuels can also be doped with other elements to increase their radiation stability, including their fission gas retention. This increases their burnup and fuel efficiency. All three metal oxides of importance, UO_{2}, PuO_{2}, and ThO_{2}, also all have the same fluorite crystal structure.

=== Uranium dioxide ===
Uranium dioxide (UO_{2}) is a brittle, black, semiconducting solid. As of 2026, UO_{2} fuels more than 90% of nuclear power plants. It has excellent stability and is resistant to corrosion by water and steam. It also features high tolerance to radiation damage, allowing high fuel burnup. There are over 70 years of operating experience with UO_{2} in commercial reactors, so fabrication techniques are well-established. Uranium dioxide is easy to harness for nuclear power because uranium is naturally fissile. However, it has a complex conversion and fabrication process. UO_{2} also has only one crystal structure below its melting point, and thus has no expansion or contraction associated with phase change.

It is chemically stable at room temperature, and does not react with most elements below 500 °C. However, UO_{2} will oxidize to UO_{3} above 200 °C, and to U_{3}O_{8} above 500 °C. It can also self-ignite at small (less than 0.5 μm) particle sizes while at room temperature. UO_{2} melts around 3120 K, which is much higher than the melting point of pure uranium metal (1405 K). One major disadvantage of UO_{2} is its low thermal conductivity, which decreases further with increasing fuel temperature. Low thermal conductivity results in very high temperatures at the center of a fuel pellet.

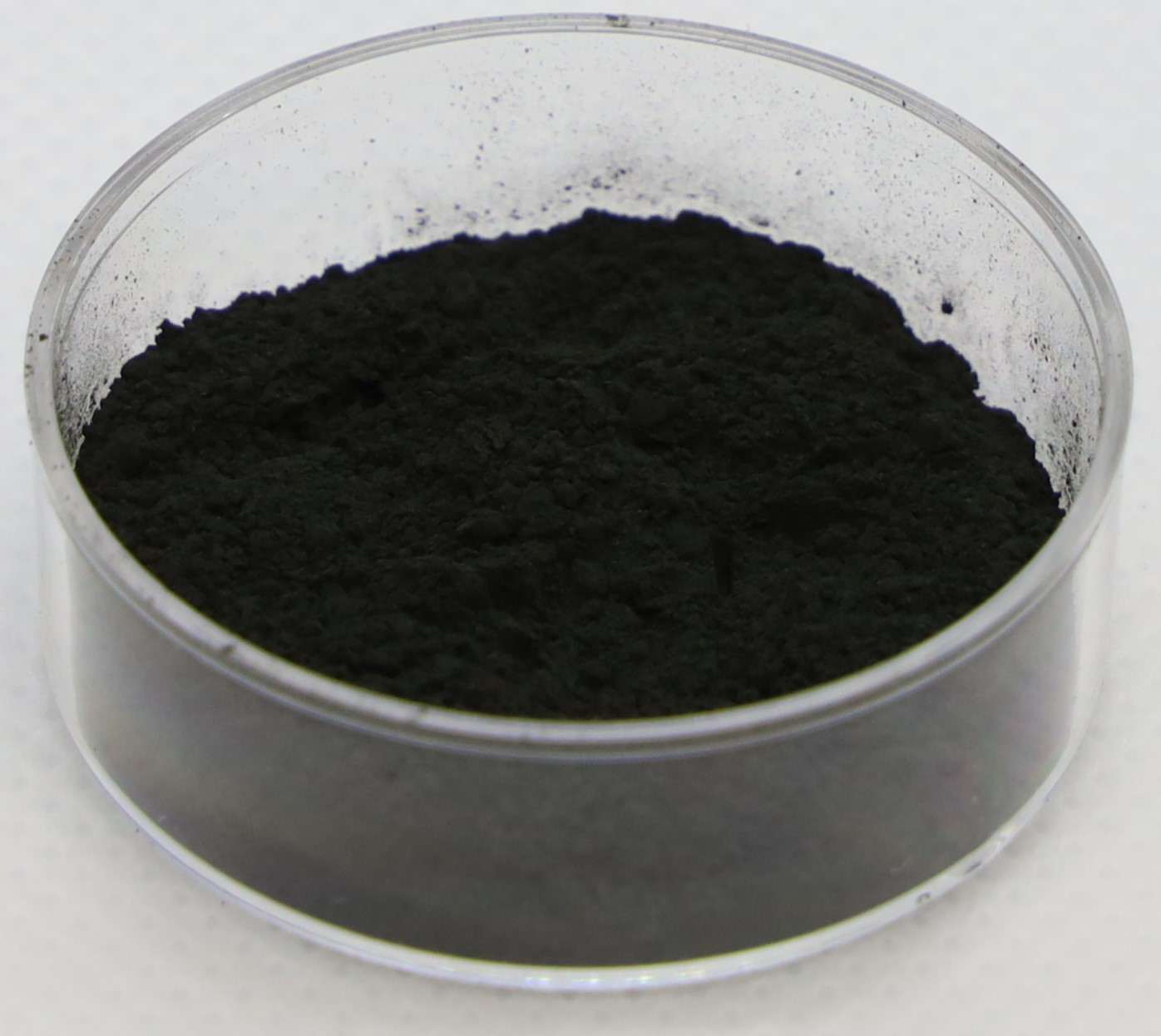
Powdered uranium dioxide, prior to forming and sintering into a fuel pellet

UO_{2} can be fabricated directly from natural uranium, however most UO_{2} fuel pellets are made from low-enriched uranium. Enriched uranium is produced as uranium hexafluoride (UF_{6}), and must be converted into UO_{2} for fuel fabrication. There are three primary conversion methods: the integrated dry process, and two 'wet' processes using either ammonium diuranate (ADU) and ammonium uranyl carbonate (AUC). The dry process is the most commonly used process, and results in significantly less liquid chemical waste than the wet processes.

In the dry process, UF_{6} gas is hydrolyzed with steam to produce uranyl fluoride, which is then reduced with hydrogen gas in a fluidized bed chemical reactor to produce UO_{2}. The resulting UO_{2} powder is then dried in a rotary kiln.

UF_{6} + 2 H_{2}O → UO_{2}F_{2} + 4 HF
UO_{2}F_{2} + H_{2} → UO_{2} + 2 HF

The dry process results in very little chemical waste, as the HF gas can be easily reclaimed and recycled. It is also easy to automate.

The ADU method is the most commonly used process in China. It involves hydrolyzing UF_{6} into uranyl fluoride, followed by reaction with ammonia to produce ammonium diuranate (ADU). The ADU is washed, dried, and calcined to form U_{3}O_{8}, which is then reduced using hydrogen or ammonia to form UO_{2}. The ADU method is cumbersome, involves many steps, and produces significant quantities of radioactive liquid waste. The AUC process, first developed in Germany in the 1960s, is similar but involves ammonium uranyl carbonate instead of ADU. The AUC process produces high-quality UO_{2} particles which do not need to be granulated before pressing, but still produces large quantities of liquid waste. Natural uranium dioxide fuel is typically produced from natural UO_{3} via the ADU process.

Following conversion, the resulting UO_{2} powder is granulated and mixed with binding and lubricating agents, then pelleted and pressed into green ceramic pellets. The pellets are then sintered at high temperature in a furnace, before being precision ground to a tight dimensional tolerance.

The thermal conductivity of uranium dioxide is very low compared with that of zirconium metal, and it goes down as the temperature goes up. Corrosion of uranium dioxide in water is controlled by similar electrochemical processes to the galvanic corrosion of a metal surface.

While exposed to the neutron flux during normal operation in the core environment, a small percentage of the ^{238}U in the fuel absorbs excess neutrons and is transmuted into ^{239}U. ^{239}U rapidly decays into ^{239}Np which in turn rapidly decays into ^{239}Pu. The small percentage of ^{239}Pu has a higher neutron cross section than ^{235}U. As the ^{239}Pu accumulates the chain reaction shifts from pure ^{235}U at initiation of the fuel use to a ratio of about 70% ^{235}U and 30% ^{239}Pu at the end of the 18 to 24 month fuel exposure period.

=== MOX ===
Mixed oxide, or MOX fuel, is a blend of plutonium and natural or depleted uranium which behaves similarly (though not identically) to the enriched uranium feed for which most nuclear reactors were designed. MOX fuel is an alternative to low enriched uranium (LEU) fuel used in the light water reactors which predominate nuclear power generation.

Adding plutonium to oxide fuel increases fissile concentration without requiring further enrichment, while allowing the use of plutonium recovered from spent nuclear fuel. MOX fuels have been used in European and Japanese LWRs, and represent approximately 2% of newly manufactured fuel as of 2026. Mixed-oxide fuels can also utilize thorium when combined with either enriched uranium or plutonium.

Some concern has been expressed that used MOX cores will introduce new disposal challenges, though MOX is a means to dispose of surplus plutonium by transmutation. Reprocessing of commercial nuclear fuel to make MOX was done in the Sellafield MOX Plant (England). As of 2015, MOX fuel is made in France at the Marcoule Nuclear Site, and to a lesser extent in Russia at the Mining and Chemical Combine, India and Japan. China plans to develop fast breeder reactors and reprocessing.

The Global Nuclear Energy Partnership was a U.S. proposal in the George W. Bush administration to form an international partnership to see spent nuclear fuel reprocessed in a way that renders the plutonium in it usable for nuclear fuel but not for nuclear weapons. Reprocessing of spent commercial-reactor nuclear fuel has not been permitted in the United States due to nonproliferation considerations. All other reprocessing nations have long had nuclear weapons from military-focused research reactor fuels except for Japan. Normally, with the fuel being changed every three years or so, about half of the ^{239}Pu is 'burned' in the reactor, providing about one third of the total energy. It behaves like ^{235}U and its fission releases a similar amount of energy. The higher the burnup, the more plutonium is present in the spent fuel, but the available fissile plutonium is lower. Typically about one percent of the used fuel discharged from a reactor is plutonium, and some two thirds of this is fissile (c. 50% ^{239}Pu, 15% ^{241}Pu).

== Metal fuel ==
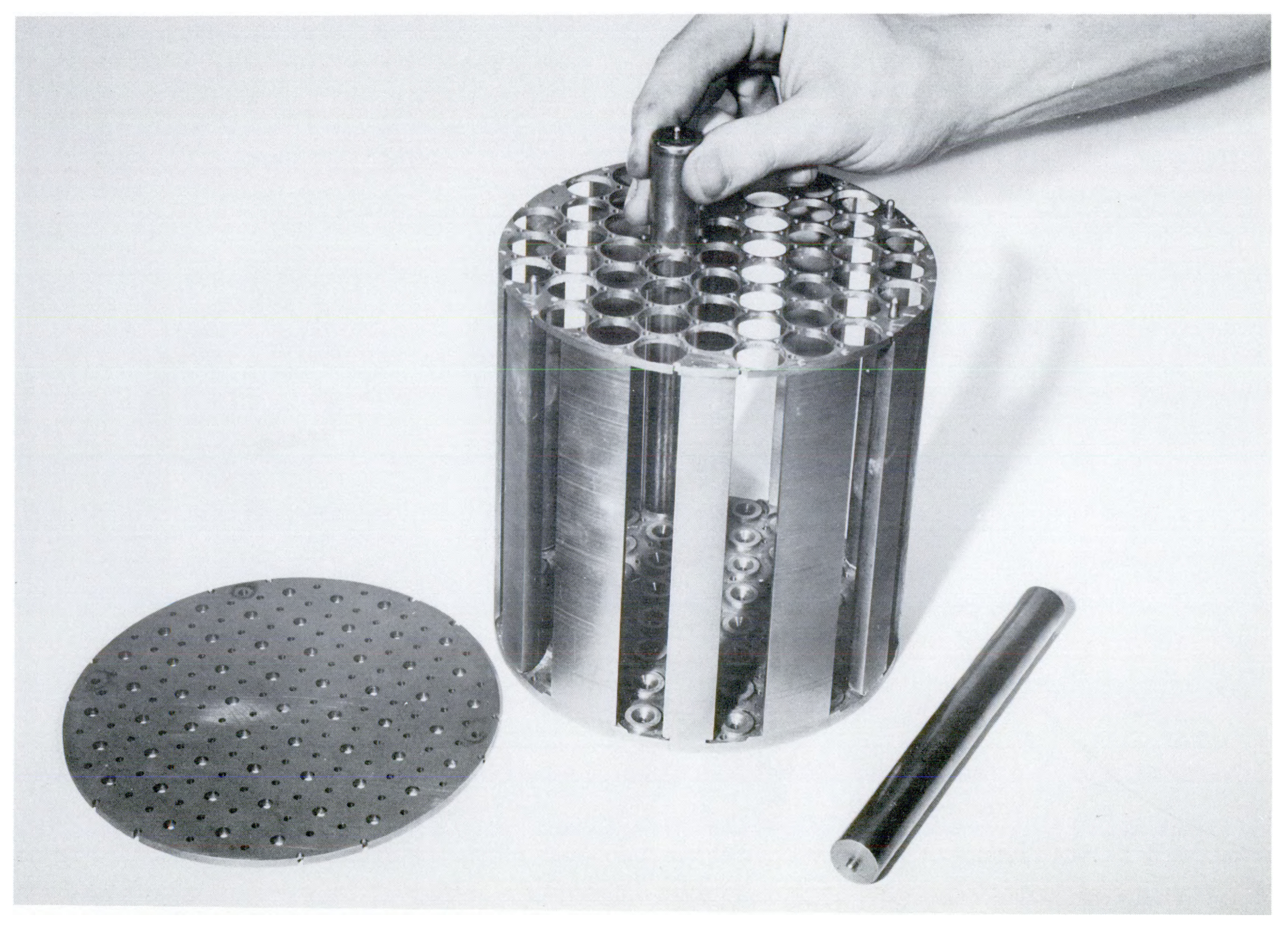
Clementine, the first fast-neutron reactor, used plutonium metal rods clad with carbon steel as fuel

Metal fuels are easy to fabricate, and have high thermal conductivity and fissile atom density. Metal fuels have a long history of use, stretching from the X-10 Graphite Reactor in 1943 to many test and research reactors. Pure uranium or plutonium metal can be used, however metal fuels are typically alloys. Metal fuels can also incorporate minor actinides as part of a closed nuclear fuel cycle. As with oxide fuel, metal fuel is typically contained within a cladding material, both to provide structural support and prevent fission product release into the reactor coolant.

Compared to oxides, metal fuels are easier to manufacture and reprocess, but suffer from greater swelling under irradiation. They have a lower melting point than ceramic fuels, and thus cannot survive equally high temperatures. Metal fuels swell more under irradiation because they retain fission gases better than oxide fuel. Lanthanide fission products also tend to migrate to the surface of the fuel and can react with ferrous cladding materials.

While metal fuels melt at a lower temperature compared to ceramics, their far higher thermal conductivity results in significantly lower peak fuel temperatures, preventing fuel melt. Metal fuel also has a large coefficient of thermal expansion, which serves as an inherent safety feature. As the fuel heats up, the expansion of the metal will increase neutron leakage and slow the reaction. Metals also have a lower Doppler coefficient, preventing reactivity from spiking during cooldown. Compared to ceramics, metal fuels have lower heat capacity, allowing the fuel to be readily cooled during an accident. Thus, even with lower melting temperature, the margin to failure of metal fuels can be significantly higher than ceramics.

Pure uranium metal has the highest possible fissile atom density of any nuclear fuel, however it has very poor irradiation stability. Its poor physical, chemical, and irradiation properties limit its use in reactors. To improve its irradiation characteristics, it is usually alloyed with other elements. The alloys that have been used include uranium-zirconium (U-Zr), uranium zirconium hydride (UZrH), and uranium-molybdenum, as well as intermetallic compounds like uranium-aluminum, or uranium-silicon.

Metal fuels are often used in fast reactors because of their ease of fabrication, high fissile density, and ease of reprocessing. Metal fuel is easily recyclable through melting or pyroprocessing. Early sodium-cooled fast reactors (SFRs) predominantly used metal fuel, notably Experimental Breeder Reactor II (EBR-II). Subsequent issues, especially radiation-induced swelling, led to fast reactor programs switching to oxide fuel instead. As the behavior of metal fuel in EBR-II was better understood, metal fuels capable of high-burnup operation were developed. Better cladding materials, notably HT9, largely solved issues of metal fuel deformation.

Metal fuel development for SFRs largely focuses on U-Zr (commonly U-10%Zr or U-10Zr) or uranium-plutonium-zirconium (U-Pu-Zr) alloys. U-Pu-Zr fuel can also be fabricated with minor actinides for use in transmuting spent nuclear fuel. Zirconium-based alloys exhibit good irradiation stability and chemical compatibility, and are easy to reprocess. In the United States, the Integral fast reactor program developed U-Zr and U-Pu-Zr fuels capable of withstanding high burnup without any fuel failures.

=== TRIGA fuel ===
TRIGA fuel is used in TRIGA (Training, Research, Isotopes, General Atomics) reactors. The TRIGA reactor uses UZrH fuel, which has a prompt negative fuel temperature coefficient of reactivity, meaning that as the temperature of the core increases, the reactivity decreases. Most cores that use this fuel are "high leakage" cores where the excess leaked neutrons can be utilized for research. That is, they can be used as a neutron source. TRIGA fuel was originally designed to use highly enriched uranium, however in 1978 the U.S. Department of Energy launched its Reduced Enrichment for Research Test Reactors program, which promoted reactor conversion to low-enriched uranium fuel. There are 35 TRIGA reactors in the US and an additional 35 in other countries.

== Non-oxide ceramic fuels ==
Ceramics other than oxides, especially carbides and nitrides, have desirable thermal and physical properties. These include higher density and thermal conductivity than oxides, while maintaining a high melting point. Non-oxide ceramics have seen little commercial use and are not as well understood as oxides, but have attracted interest as advanced fuel concepts for non-light-water reactors. They are also more prone to swelling than oxide fuels.

=== Uranium nitride ===
Nitride fuels include uranium mononitride (UN) and uranium-plutonium nitride solid solutions. Nitride fuel exhibits high thermal conductivity, fissile atom density, and thermal stability, as well as a high melting point. Compared with carbide fuel, nitrides have a lower hygroscopicity, and are more compatible with wet chemical treatment techniques such as dissolution in nitric acid.

Uranium nitride fuels were initially examined for space nuclear power, under the Systems for Nuclear Auxiliary Power (SNAP) and SP-100 programs. Nitride fuel was selected for space reactors and fast reactors because of its high uranium density, high thermal conductivity, and good chemical stability. More recently, nitride fuel has emerged as an advanced fuel concept for fast reactors, and have attracted interest for space nuclear reactors and HTGRs.

Nitride fuel is difficult to fabricate commercially, and impurities that cause fuel swelling, such as carbon and oxygen, must be tightly controlled. Fabricating high-density UN fuel also requires sintering at temperatures above 1,900 °C. Powdered UN is also pyrophoric, and requires handling under inert gas. Pure UN reacts with water and steam, which poses an issue for use in LWRs.

The presence of neutron-absorbing nitrogen-14, which comprises 99.6% of natural nitrogen, curtails nitride fuels' neutron economy. Its impact on neutron economy requires expensive isotope separation of nitrogen to reduce the production of unwanted and long-lived carbon-14. Unless ^{15}N is used instead of ^{14}N, a large amount of ^{14}C would be generated from the nitrogen by the (n,p) reaction. As the nitrogen needed for such a fuel would be so expensive it is likely that the fuel would require pyroprocessing to enable recovery of the ^{15}N. It is likely that if the fuel was processed and dissolved in nitric acid that the nitrogen enriched with ^{15}N would be diluted with the common ^{14}N. Fluoride volatility is a method of reprocessing that does not rely on nitric acid, but it has only been demonstrated in relatively small scale installations whereas the established PUREX process is used commercially for about a third of all spent nuclear fuel (the rest being largely subject to a "once through fuel cycle").

All nitrogen-fluoride compounds are volatile or gaseous at room temperature and could be fractionally distilled from the other gaseous products (including recovered uranium hexafluoride) to recover the initially used nitrogen. If the fuel could be processed in such a way as to ensure low contamination with non-radioactive carbon (not a common fission product and absent in nuclear reactors that don't use it as a moderator) then fluoride volatility could be used to separate the ^{14}C produced by producing carbon tetrafluoride. ^{14}C is proposed for use in particularly long lived low power nuclear batteries called diamond batteries.

=== Uranium carbide ===
Carbide fuels, typically uranium carbide (UC) or uranium-plutonium carbides, share high melting points, good mechanical properties, and good radiation resistance. Compared with oxides, carbides have higher fissile atom density and high thermal conductivity. Unlike oxide fuel, irradiation does not liberate oxygen, so fuel-cladding chemical interactions are reduced. UC also does not require isotopic enrichment as nitride fuels do. However, UC displays significantly higher swelling than oxide fuel.

Uranium carbides are highly pyrophoric, and have dissatisfactory fission gas retention. High-density carbide fuels are difficult to fabricate, requiring high temperatures, long sintering times, and inert gas environments to produce, and are seen as commercially unattractive. However, their high fissile density and thermal conductivity make them attractive for space applications. Carbide fuel, potentially with silicon carbide cladding, has attracted interest as a fuel candidate for gas-cooled fast reactors.

Development of carbide fuels initially focused on fast reactors, due to their favorable breeding characteristics and thermal properties. Carbides' high fissile atom density allows for reduced fissile material inventory, which improves breeding rates and lowers the doubling time of a breeder reactor. Carbide fuel also has excellent compatibility with the sodium coolant used in liquid metal-cooled fast breeder reactors.

The anticipated shortage of uranium led to a search for fuel with a lower doubling time than oxide fuel (25 years). Carbide fuel, with its high thermal conductivity and melting point, allows operation at high specific power and a more compact core. These characteristics led to significant development in the 1960s and carbides of uranium, plutonium, and thorium were studied during this period. The development of carbide fuels slowed during the 1970s, likely because it was difficult to fabricate at a low cost. Behavior of carbide fuels under accident conditions was also not significantly investigated.

Mixed thorium-uranium carbides, in the form of coated particles, were also used in high-temperature gas-cooled reactors, such as Peach Bottom Unit 1 and Fort St. Vrain.

While the neutron cross section of carbon is low, during years of burnup, the predominantly ^{12}C will undergo neutron capture to produce stable ^{13}C as well as radioactive ^{14}C. Unlike the ^{14}C produced by using uranium nitrate, the ^{14}C will make up only a small isotopic impurity in the overall carbon content and thus make the entirety of the carbon content unsuitable for non-nuclear uses but the ^{14}C concentration will be too low for use in nuclear batteries without enrichment. Nuclear graphite discharged from reactors where it was used as a moderator presents the same issue.

== Liquid fuels ==
Liquid fuels contain fissile materials in a carrier fluid, either dissolved or as a slurry, and offer several operational advantages compared to traditional solid fuels. Solid fuels suffer from radiation damage and corrosion, while liquid fuels do not. Liquid fuels also eliminate the expensive process of fuel fabrication and allow for simplified reprocessing. Liquid fuels also present several challenges, including corrosion of the reactor vessel.

Liquid-fuel reactors also offer significant safety advantages over solid fuel reactors due to their inherently stable reactor dynamics. Liquid fuels, especially aqueous fuel, tend to have a strong negative fuel temperature coefficient of reactivity. A power excursion in a fluid-fueled reactor heats up the fuel and moderator, and the chain reaction slows quickly. This provides two major benefits: virtually eliminating the possibility of a runaway reactor meltdown, and providing an automatic load-following capability which is well suited to electricity generation and high-temperature industrial heat applications. Some liquid-fueled reactors do not require control rods. In some liquid core designs, the fuel can be drained rapidly into a passively-safe drain tank. This was demonstrated repeatedly as part of the regular shutdown procedure of the Molten-Salt Reactor Experiment from 1965 to 1969.

A liquid core is able to release xenon gas, which normally acts as a neutron absorber (^{135}Xe is the strongest known neutron poison and is produced both directly and as a decay product of ^{135}I as a fission product) and causes structural occlusions in solid fuel elements (leading to the early replacement of solid fuel rods with over 98% of the nuclear fuel unburned, including many long-lived actinides). In contrast, molten-salt reactors are capable of retaining the fuel mixture for significantly extended periods, which increases fuel efficiency dramatically and incinerates the vast majority of its own waste as part of the normal operational characteristics. A downside to letting the ^{135}Xe escape instead of allowing it to capture neutrons converting it to the basically stable and chemically inert ^{136}Xe, is that it will quickly decay to the highly chemically reactive, long lived radioactive ^{135}Cs, which behaves similar to other alkali metals and can be taken up by organisms in their metabolism.

=== Aqueous solutions of uranyl salts ===
Aqueous homogeneous reactors use a solution or slurry of uranyl sulfate or other uranium salt in water. They were among the first nuclear reactors constructed, and several research reactors of this type were built. Historically, AHRs have all been small research reactors, not large power reactors.

=== Molten salts ===
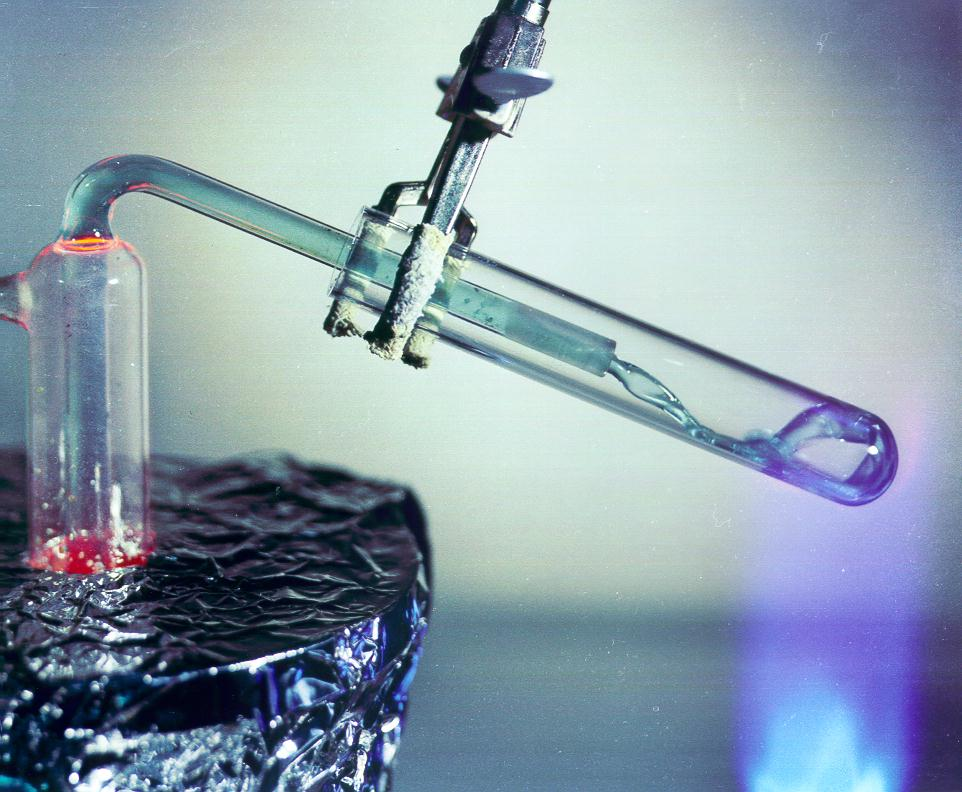
Molten FLiBe salt; its green color comes from dissolved uranium tetrafluoride

Molten salt fuels are mixtures of actinide salts (e.g. thorium/uranium fluoride/chloride) with other salts, used in liquid form above their typical melting points of several hundred degrees C. In some molten salt-fueled reactor designs, such as the liquid fluoride thorium reactor (LFTR), this fuel salt is also the coolant; in other designs, such as the stable salt reactor, the fuel salt is contained in fuel pins and the coolant is a separate, non-radioactive salt.

Molten salt fuels were successfully used in the Aircraft Reactor Experiment and Molten Salt Reactor Experiment (MSRE), and are currently used in the TMSR-LF1 research reactor. The liquid fuel for MSRE was uranium tetrafluoride dissolved in LiF-BeF_{2} mixture (FLiBe). It had a peak operating temperature of 705 °C in the experiment, but could have operated at much higher temperatures since the boiling point of the molten salt was in excess of 1400 °C.

=== Liquid metals or alloys ===
A liquid metal-fueled reactor concept was developed at Brookhaven National Laboratory in the 1950s, fueled on uranium dissolved in liquid bismuth. The proposed dual fluid reactor (DFR) has a variant DFR/m which works with eutectic liquid metal alloys, e.g. U-Cr or U-Fe.

=== Molten plutonium ===
Molten plutonium, alloyed with iron to lower its melting point and encapsulated in tantalum, was used as a fuel in the Los Alamos Molten Plutonium Reactor Experiment (LAMPRE) in the 1960s. LAMPRE experienced three separate fuel failures during operation, however they did not cause any operational issues. The reactor operated between 1961 and 1963, and was expected to be succeeded by the larger LAMPRE-II. However, the program was cancelled and LAMPRE-II was never constructed.

== Common physical forms ==
The standard fuel form for most reactors worldwide consists of uranium dioxide ceramic pellets, sealed into zirconium alloy (zircaloy) cladding tubes called fuel rods. For light-water reactors, the uranium is typically low-enriched uranium, while heavy-water reactors typically use natural (unenriched) uranium.

Uranium dioxide (UO_{2}) powder is compacted to cylindrical pellets and sintered at high temperatures to produce ceramic nuclear fuel pellets with a high density and well defined physical properties and chemical composition. A grinding process is used to achieve a uniform cylindrical geometry with narrow tolerances. These pellets are then stacked into a metal cladding tube. The metal used for the tubes depends on the design of the reactor. Stainless steel was used in the past, but most reactors now use a zirconium alloy which, in addition to being highly corrosion-resistant, has low neutron absorption. The tubes containing the fuel pellets are pressurized with helium and sealed. The finished fuel rods are grouped into fuel assemblies that are used to build up the core of a power reactor.

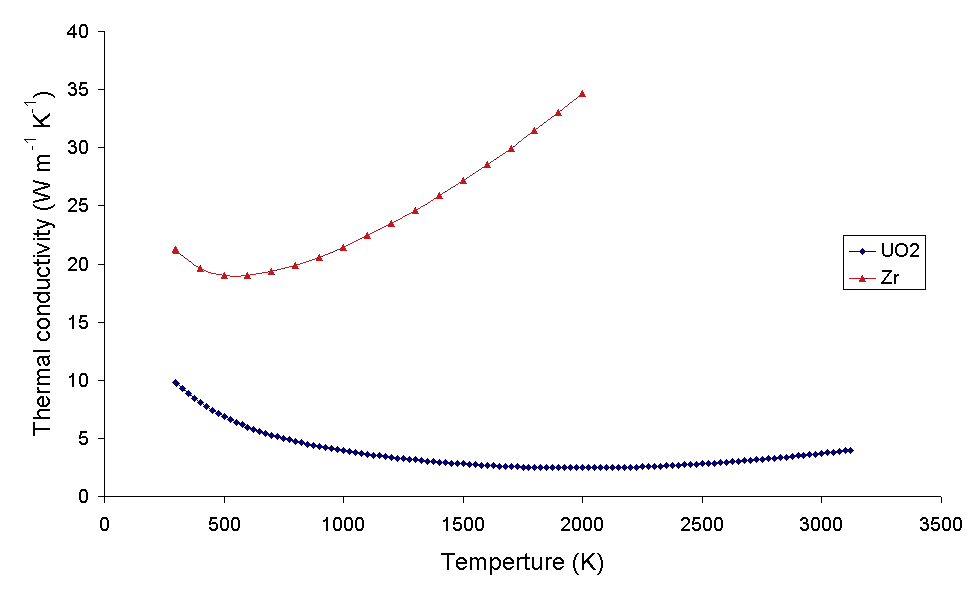
The thermal conductivity of zirconium metal and uranium dioxide as a function of temperature

Cladding is the outer layer of the fuel rods, standing between the coolant and the nuclear fuel. It is made of a corrosion-resistant material with low absorption cross section for thermal neutrons, usually Zircaloy or steel in modern constructions, or magnesium with small amount of aluminium and other metals for the now-obsolete Magnox reactors. Cladding prevents radioactive fission fragments from escaping the fuel into the coolant and contaminating it. Besides the prevention of radioactive leaks this also serves to keep the coolant as non-corrosive as feasible and to prevent reactions between chemically aggressive fission products and the coolant. For example, the highly reactive alkali metal caesium which reacts strongly with water, producing hydrogen, and which is among the more common fission products. (Note: The fission product yields of both ^{135}Cs and ^{137}Cs are roughly 6%, meaning every kilogram of ^{235}U split will result in roughly 35 grams each of ^{135}Cs and ^{137}Cs). Besides those well-known middle to long-lived radioactive caesium isotopes there are other isotopes of caesium like ^{133}Cs (stable) and ^{134}Cs (half life around two years) that are present in "fresh" spent nuclear fuel in non-trivial amounts)

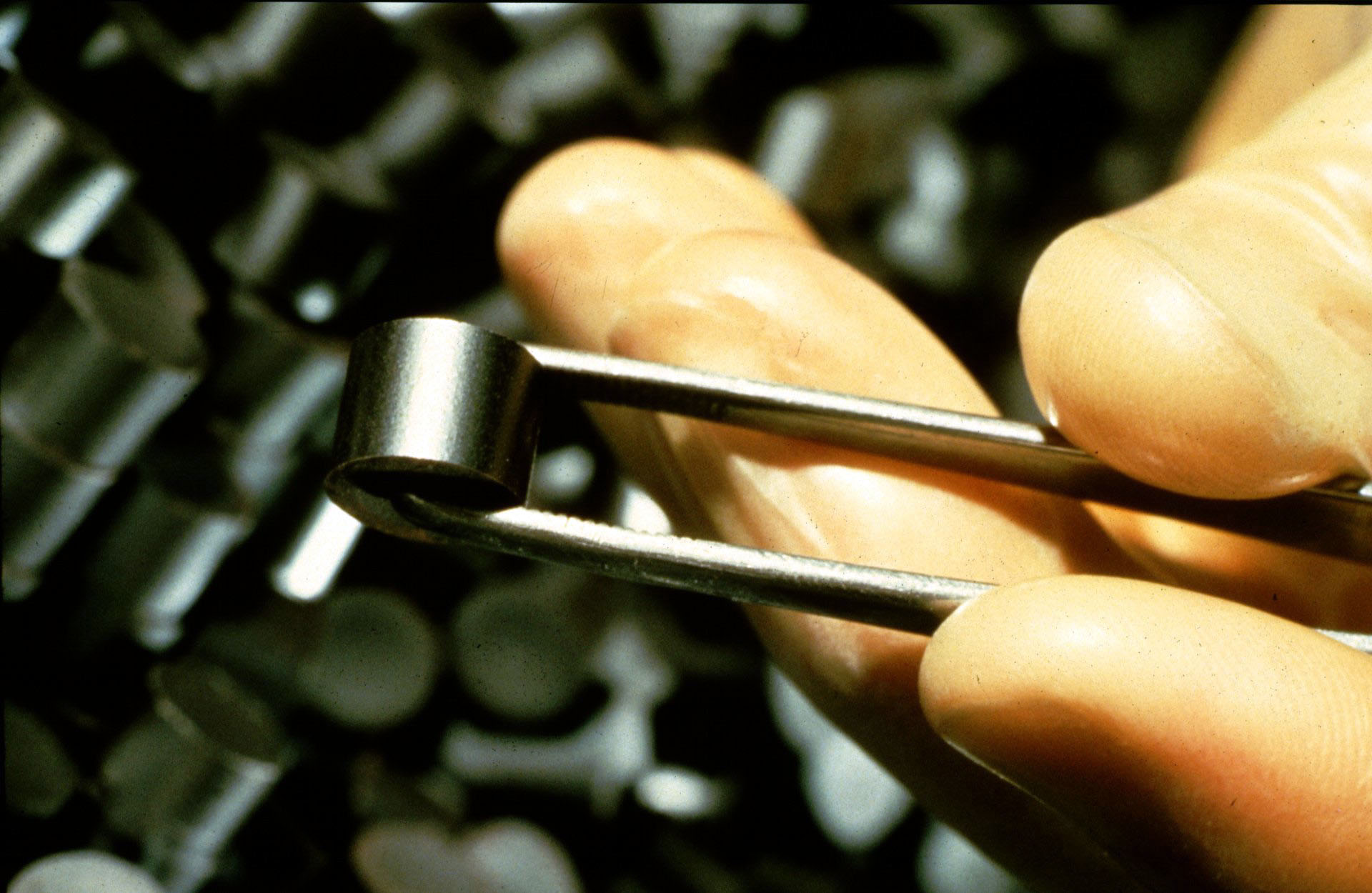
Nuclear Regulatory Commission (NRC) photo of unirradiated (fresh) fuel pellets.

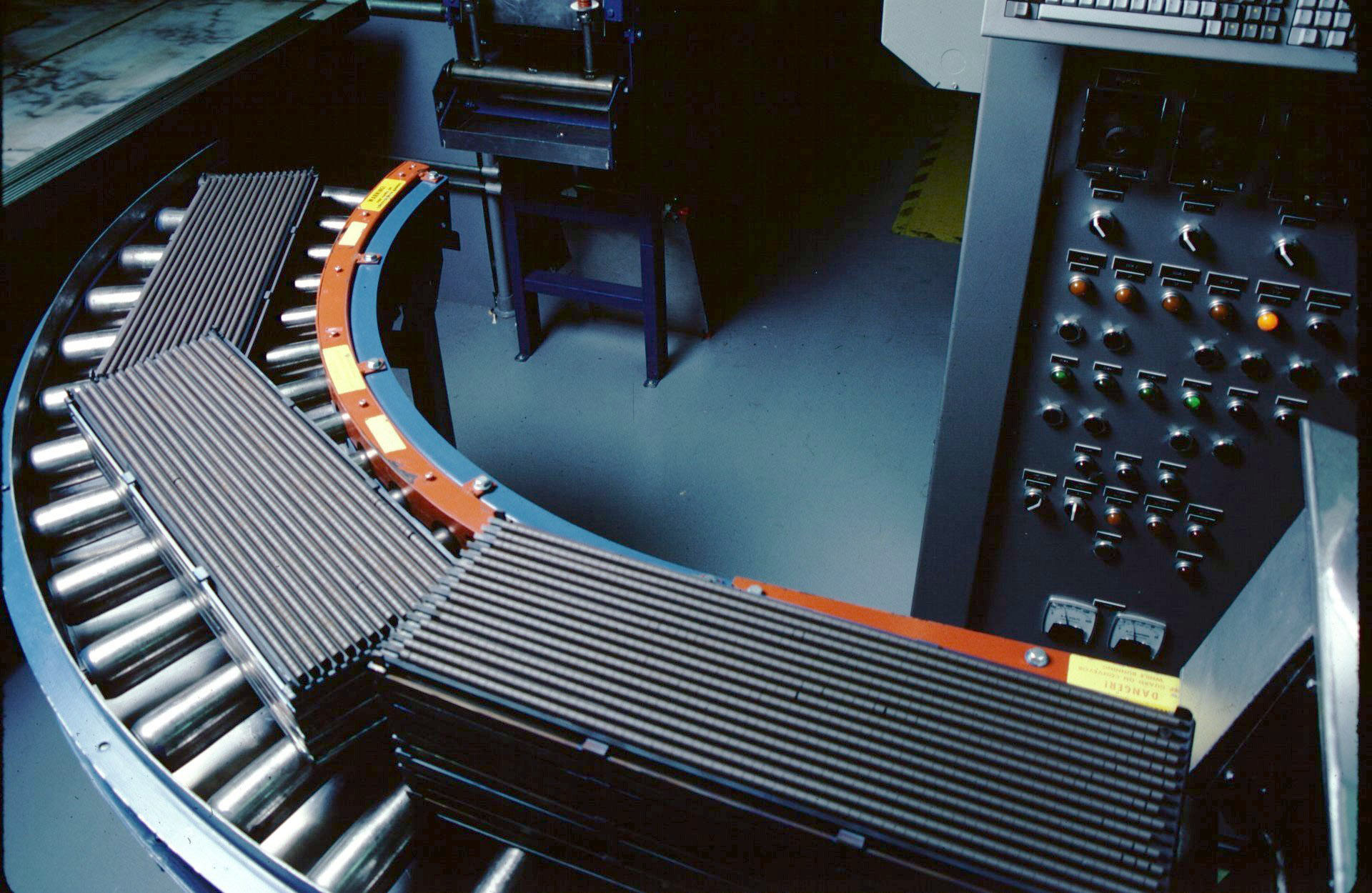
NRC photo of fresh fuel pellets ready for assembly.

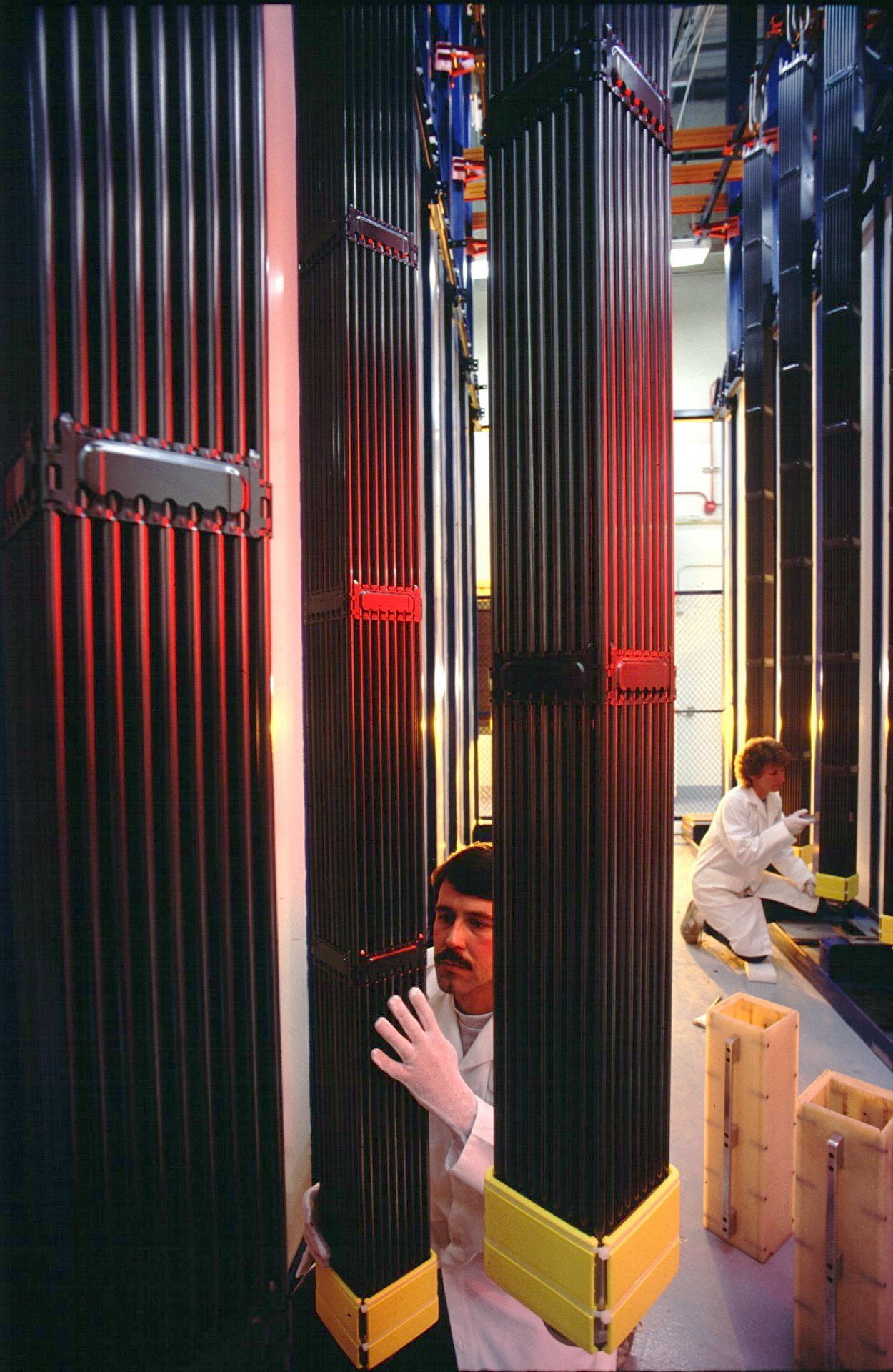
NRC photo of fresh fuel assemblies being inspected.

=== Pressurized water reactor fuel ===
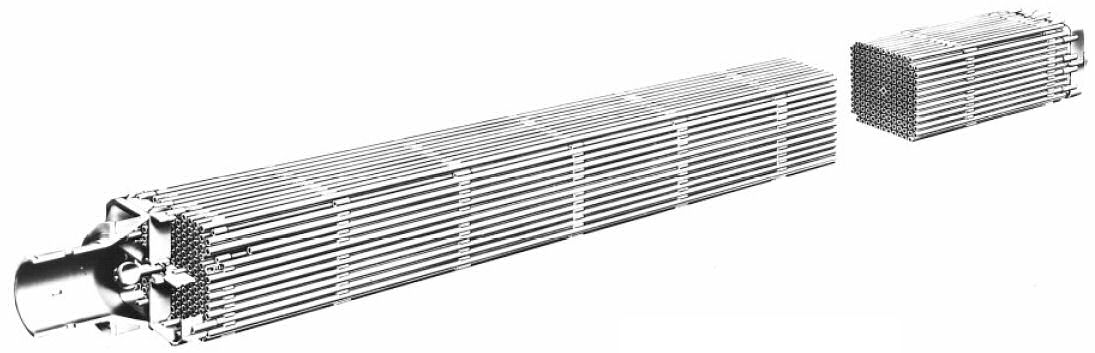
PWR fuel assembly (also known as a fuel bundle) This fuel assembly is from a pressurized water reactor of the nuclear-powered passenger and cargo ship NS Savannah. Designed and built by the Babcock & Wilcox Company.

Pressurized water reactor (PWR) fuel consists of cylindrical rods put into bundles. A uranium oxide ceramic is formed into pellets and inserted into Zircaloy tubes that are bundled together. The Zircaloy tubes are about 1 centimetre (0.4 in) in diameter, and the fuel cladding gap is filled with helium gas to improve heat conduction from the fuel to the cladding. There are about 179–264 fuel rods per fuel bundle and about 121 to 193 fuel bundles are loaded into a reactor core. Generally, the fuel bundles consist of fuel rods bundled 14×14 to 17×17. PWR fuel bundles are about 4 m (13 ft) long. In PWR fuel bundles, control rods are inserted through the top directly into the fuel bundle. The fuel bundles usually are enriched several percent in ^{235}U. The uranium oxide is dried before inserting into the tubes to try to eliminate moisture in the ceramic fuel that can lead to corrosion and hydrogen embrittlement. The Zircaloy tubes are pressurized with helium to try to minimize pellet-cladding interaction which can lead to fuel rod failure over long periods. Over time, thermal expansion and fission gas release cause the fuel pellets to crack and deform into an 'hourglass' shape, which in turn leads to a characteristic 'bamboo'-like deformation of the cladding. These mechanical interactions can stress the cladding, especially as internal rod pressure increases and fuel swelling continues throughout irradiation.

=== Boiling water reactor fuel ===
In boiling water reactors (BWR), the fuel is similar to PWR fuel except that the bundles are "canned". Each fuel bundle is surrounded by a thin zircaloy channel box which directs the flow of water inside each bundle. This is primarily done to prevent local density variations from affecting neutronics and thermal hydraulics of the reactor core. In modern BWR fuel bundles, there are either 91, 92, or 96 fuel rods per assembly depending on the manufacturer. A range between 368 assemblies for the smallest and 800 assemblies for the largest BWR in the U.S. form the reactor core. Each BWR fuel rod is backfilled with helium to a pressure of about 3 standard atmospheres (300 kPa).

=== Canada deuterium uranium fuel ===
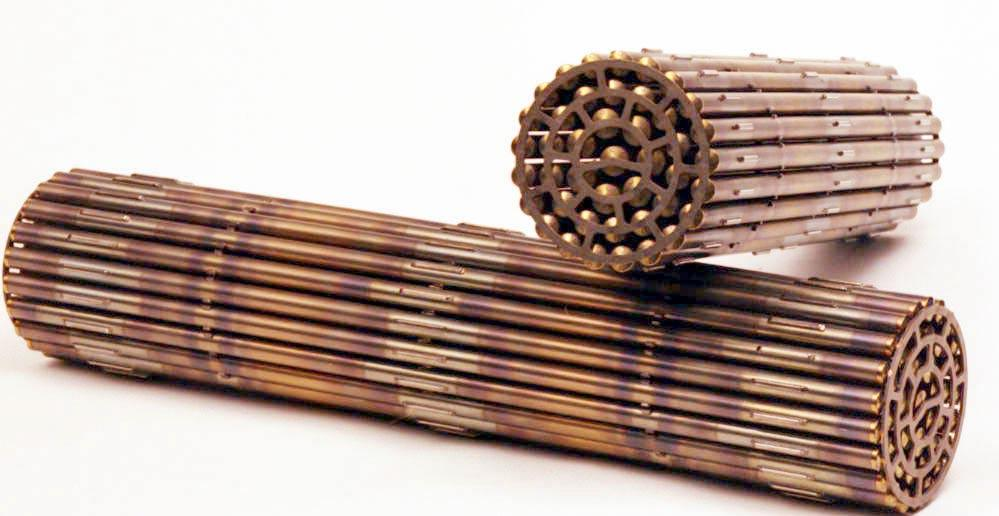
CANDU fuel bundles, each about 50 cm long, 10 cm in diameter.

Canada deuterium uranium (CANDU) fuel bundles are about 0.5 metres (20 in) long and 10 centimetres (4 in) in diameter. They consist of sintered (UO_{2}) pellets in zirconium alloy tubes, welded to zirconium alloy end plates. Each bundle weighs roughly 20 kilograms (44 lb), and a typical core loading is on the order of 4500–6500 bundles, depending on the design. Modern types typically have 37 identical fuel pins radially arranged about the long axis of the bundle, but in the past several different configurations and numbers of pins have been used.

The CANFLEX bundle has 43 fuel elements, with two element sizes. It is also about 10 cm (4 inches) in diameter, 0.5 m (20 in) long and weighs about 20 kg (44 lb) and replaces the 37-pin standard bundle. Each CANFLEX bundle provides increased specific power output compared to a standard CANDU bundle.

Current CANDU designs do not need enriched uranium to achieve criticality (due to the lower neutron absorption in their heavy water moderator compared to light water). CANDU reactors are also capable of directly utilizing spent light-water reactor fuel. However, some newer concepts call for low enrichment to help reduce the size of the reactors. The Atucha nuclear power plant in Argentina, a similar design to the CANDU but built by German KWU was originally designed for non-enriched fuel but since switched to slightly enriched fuel with a ^{235}U content about 0.1 percentage points higher than in natural uranium.

== Less-common fuel forms ==
Various other nuclear fuel forms find use in specific applications, but lack the widespread use of those found in BWRs, PWRs, and CANDU power plants. Many of these fuel forms are only found in research reactors, or have military applications.

=== Gas-cooled reactor fuel ===
Early gas-cooled reactors (GCRs), including the British Magnox and French UNGG designs, were carbon dioxide-cooled, graphite-moderated reactors fueled with natural uranium metal. These dual-purpose reactors were built to produce both electricity and plutonium for nuclear weapons.

Earlier dedicated plutonium production reactors used aluminum fuel cladding, due to its low neutron cross section and good corrosion resistance. Because they were intended to produce electrical power as well, both GCR designs used magnesium alloys, which could operate at higher temperatures. Magnox reactors used magnesium non-oxidizing (magnox) alloy, from which they derived their name, while UNGG reactors used a magnesium-zirconium alloy. The magnesium alloys, while corrosion-resistant to the CO_{2} coolant, had two major disadvantages:

- While better than aluminum, they still could not operate at high temperatures, which limited the operating temperature and thus thermal efficiency of the power plant.
- Magnesium alloys react with water, preventing storage in a spent fuel pool and making early reprocessing necessary after removal from the reactor.

Each fuel element consisted of a solid or hollow cylinder of uranium, sealed inside a cladding tube and pressurized with helium. The cladding surface was finned to improve heat transfer, which had the drawback of making fuel elements expensive to produce.

In the UK, the Magnox design was superseded by the Advanced Gas-cooled Reactor (AGR). AGR fuel used low-enriched uranium dioxide pellets clad in stainless steel. Each fuel assembly consists of a circular array of 36 fuel pins, surrounded by a graphite sheath. AGR fuel assemblies last about 5 years each.

=== Tristructural-isotropic fuel ===
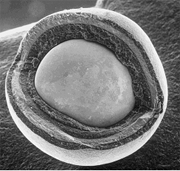
0.845 mm TRISO fuel particle which has been cracked, showing multiple layers that are coating the spherical kernel

Tristructural-isotropic (TRISO) fuel is a type of micro-particle fuel. A particle consists of a kernel of UO_{2} fuel (sometimes UC or UCO), which has been coated with four layers of three isotropic materials deposited through fluidized chemical vapor deposition (FCVD). The four layers are a porous buffer layer made of carbon that absorbs fission product recoils, followed by a dense inner layer of protective pyrolytic carbon (PyC), followed by a ceramic layer of SiC to retain fission products at elevated temperatures and to give the TRISO particle more structural integrity, followed by a dense outer layer of PyC. TRISO particles are then encapsulated into cylindrical or spherical graphite pellets. TRISO fuel particles are designed not to crack due to the stresses from processes (such as differential thermal expansion or fission gas pressure) at temperatures up to 1600 °C, and therefore can contain the fuel in the worst of accident scenarios in a properly designed reactor.

TRISO fuel particles were originally developed in the United Kingdom as part of the Dragon reactor project. Work on coated-particle fuels also took place at the same time in the United States at Peach Bottom Unit 1. The Peach Bottom reactor used a type of coated-particle fuel using only the porous carbon and PyC layers known as bistructural-isotropic (BISO).

Historically, TRISO has been used in high-temperature gas-cooled reactors (HTGRs), both prismatic-block and pebble-bed. The first reactor to use TRISO was the Dragon reactor, while the first commercial station was the Fort Saint Vrain Nuclear Power Plant, a prismatic-block HTGR. As of 2026, TRISO fuel compacts are being used in some experimental reactors, such as the HTR-10 in China and the high-temperature engineering test reactor in Japan, as well as commercially in the 100 MW_{e} HTR-PM pebble-bed HTGR.

In the United States, spherical fuel pebbles containing TRISO particles with a UO_{2} and UC solid solution kernel are being explored for use in the X-energy Xe-100 pebble-bed HTGR design, while Kairos Power is constructing a 50 MW_{e} pebble-bed molten-salt reactor using TRISO fuel. Such pebbles can be coated in additional silicon to become effectively fireproof. TRISO is also being explored for use in the very-high-temperature reactor (VHTR) concept, one of the six classes of reactor designs in the Generation IV initiative that is attempting to reach even higher HTGR outlet temperatures.

=== RBMK fuel ===
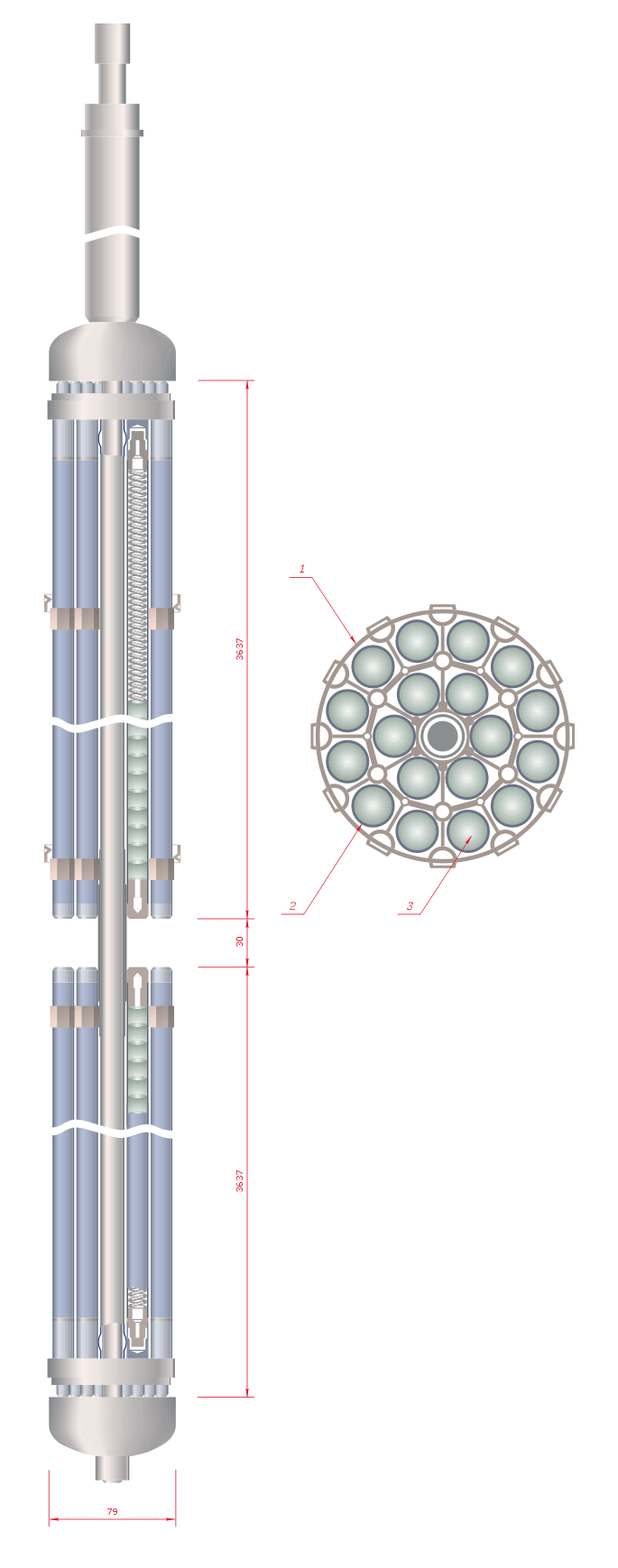
RBMK reactor fuel rod holder 1 – distancing armature; 2 – fuel rods shell; 3 – fuel tablets.

RBMK reactor fuel is used in Soviet-designed and built RBMK-type reactors. RBMK fuel consists of low-enriched uranium dioxide fuel pellets within zirconium alloy cladding. Each assembly also contains an integrated burnable poison, typically erbium oxide, for reactivity control. Fuel elements are also typically fabricated from reprocessed uranium.

Each pressure-tube fuel channel in an RBMK reactor contains two fuel assemblies mounted on a central tube. Each fuel assembly includes 18 fuel element rods, arranged in a concentric circular assembly by spacer grids. The fuel elements are each 3.64 m long and 13.6 mm in diameter. RBMK reactors originally used 2.0% enriched uranium fuel, however this was changed to 2.4% following the Chernobyl accident. The increased enrichment provides better reactivity control, and reduces the RBMK's dangerously high positive void coefficient.

=== Ceramic-metallic fuel ===
Ceramic-metallic (cermet) fuel is a type of micro-particle fuel that consists of ceramic fuel particles (usually uranium oxide) embedded in a metal matrix, which helps retain fission gases and ensures higher thermal conductivity than oxide fuel. This fuel has high heat transport characteristics and can withstand a large amount of expansion. Cermet fuel is hypothesized to be the fuel used in US naval reactors. Cermet fuel was investigated in the 1960s for use in nuclear thermal propulsion. Cermet fuels were also investigated for use with the thorium fuel cycle.

=== Plate-type fuel ===
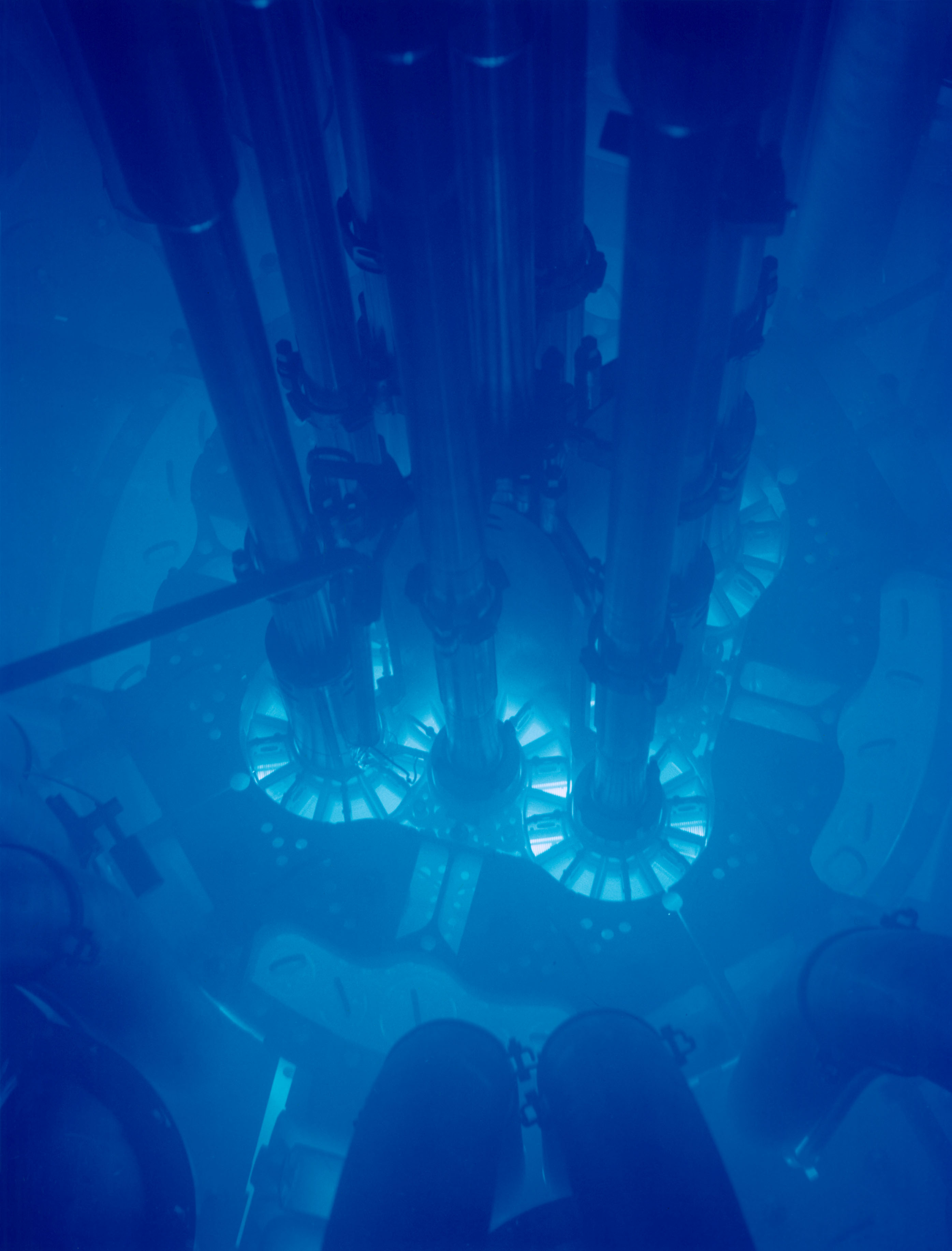
ATR Core The Advanced Test Reactor at Idaho National Laboratory uses plate-type fuel in a clover leaf arrangement. The blue glow around the core is known as Cherenkov radiation.

Plate-type fuel is commonly composed of enriched uranium sandwiched between metal cladding. It is used in several research reactors where a high neutron flux is desired, for uses such as material irradiation studies or isotope production, without the high temperatures seen in ceramic, cylindrical fuel. It is currently used in the Advanced Test Reactor (ATR) at Idaho National Laboratory, and the nuclear research reactor at the University of Massachusetts Lowell Radiation Laboratory. Plate-type fuel has fallen out of favor over the years.

=== Sodium-bonded fuel ===
Metal fuel elements usually consist of a metal fuel pin sealed in a cladding tube, with a thermal bond material between them to improve heat transfer. The most common form is sodium-bonded fuel, where the gap between the fuel pin and the cladding is filled with liquid sodium. Sodium's high thermal conductivity also means that slight variations in fuel geometry are less significant than with oxide fuel. This fuel type is often used for sodium-cooled fast reactors. It has been used in EBR-I, EBR-II, and the Fast Flux Test Facility.

== Accident tolerant fuels ==
Accident tolerant fuels (ATF) are a series of new nuclear fuel concepts, researched in order to improve fuel performance under accident conditions, such as loss-of-coolant accident (LOCA) or reaction-initiated accidents (RIA). These concerns became more prominent after the Fukushima Daiichi nuclear disaster in Japan, in particular regarding LWR fuels performance under accident conditions.

Neutronics analyses were performed for the application of the new fuel-cladding material systems for various types of ATF materials.

The aim of the research is to develop nuclear fuels that can tolerate loss of active cooling for a considerably longer period than the existing fuel designs and prevent or delay the release of radionuclides during an accident. This research is focused on reconsidering the design of fuel pellets and cladding, as well as the interactions between the two.

== Spent nuclear fuel ==
Used nuclear fuel is a complex mixture of the fission products, uranium, plutonium, and the transplutonium metals. In fuel which has been used at high temperature in power reactors it is common for the fuel to be heterogeneous; often the fuel will contain nanoparticles of platinum group metals such as palladium. Also the fuel may well have cracked, swollen, and been heated close to its melting point. Despite the fact that the used fuel can be cracked, it is very insoluble in water, and is able to retain the vast majority of the actinides and fission products within the uranium dioxide crystal lattice. The radiation hazard from spent nuclear fuel declines as its radioactive components decay, but remains high for many years. For example 10 years after removal from a reactor, the surface dose rate for a typical spent fuel assembly still exceeds 10,000 rem/hour, resulting in a fatal dose in just minutes.

== Fuel behavior and post-irradiation examination ==
Post-Irradiation Examination (PIE) is the study of used nuclear materials such as nuclear fuel. It has several purposes. It is known that by examination of used fuel that the failure modes which occur during normal use (and the manner in which the fuel will behave during an accident) can be studied. In addition information is gained which enables the users of fuel to assure themselves of its quality and it also assists in the development of new fuels. After major accidents the core (or what is left of it) is normally subject to PIE to find out what happened. One site where PIE is done is the ITU which is the EU centre for the study of highly radioactive materials.

Materials in a high-radiation environment (such as a reactor) can undergo unique behaviors such as swelling and non-thermal creep. If there are nuclear reactions within the material (such as what happens in the fuel), the stoichiometry will also change slowly over time. These behaviors can lead to new material properties, cracking, and fission gas release.

The thermal conductivity of uranium dioxide is low; it is affected by porosity and burn-up. The burn-up results in fission products being dissolved in the lattice (such as lanthanides), the precipitation of fission products such as palladium, the formation of fission gas bubbles due to fission products such as xenon and krypton and radiation damage of the lattice. The low thermal conductivity can lead to overheating of the center part of the pellets during use. The porosity results in a decrease in both the thermal conductivity of the fuel and the swelling which occurs during use.

According to the International Nuclear Safety Center the thermal conductivity of uranium dioxide can be predicted under different conditions by a series of equations.

The bulk density of the fuel can be related to the thermal conductivity.

Where ρ is the bulk density of the fuel and ρ_{td} is the theoretical density of the uranium dioxide.

Then the thermal conductivity of the porous phase (K_{f}) is related to the conductivity of the perfect phase (K_{o}, no porosity) by the following equation. Note that s is a term for the shape factor of the holes.

K_{f} = K_{o}(1 − p/1 + (s − 1)p)

Rather than measuring the thermal conductivity using the traditional methods such as Lees' disk, the Forbes' method, or Searle's bar, it is common to use Laser Flash Analysis where a small disc of fuel is placed in a furnace. After being heated to the required temperature one side of the disc is illuminated with a laser pulse, the time required for the heat wave to flow through the disc, the density of the disc, and the thickness of the disk can then be used to calculate and determine the thermal conductivity.

λ = ρC_{p}α

- λ thermal conductivity
- ρ density
- C_{p} heat capacity
- α thermal diffusivity

If t_{1/2} is defined as the time required for the non illuminated surface to experience half its final temperature rise then.

α = 0.1388 L^{2}/t_{1/2}

- L is the thickness of the disc

For details see K. Shinzato and T. Baba (2001).

=== Oxide fuel under accident conditions ===
Two main modes of release exist, the fission products can be vaporised or small particles of the fuel can be dispersed.

== Radioisotope decay fuels ==
=== Radioisotope battery ===
An atomic battery (also called a nuclear battery or radioisotope battery) is a device which uses the radioactive decay to generate electricity. These systems use radioisotopes that produce low energy beta particles or sometimes alpha particles of varying energies. Low energy beta particles are needed to prevent the production of high energy penetrating bremsstrahlung radiation that would require heavy shielding. Radioisotopes such as plutonium-238, curium-242, curium-244 and strontium-90 have been used. Tritium, nickel-63, promethium-147, and technetium-99 have been tested.

There are two main categories of atomic batteries: thermal and non-thermal. The non-thermal atomic batteries, which have many different designs, exploit charged alpha and beta particles. These designs include the direct charging generators, betavoltaics, the optoelectric nuclear battery, and the radioisotope piezoelectric generator. The thermal atomic batteries on the other hand, convert the heat from the radioactive decay to electricity. These designs include thermionic converter, thermophotovoltaic cells, alkali-metal thermal to electric converter, and the most common design, the radioisotope thermoelectric generator.

=== Radioisotope thermoelectric generator ===
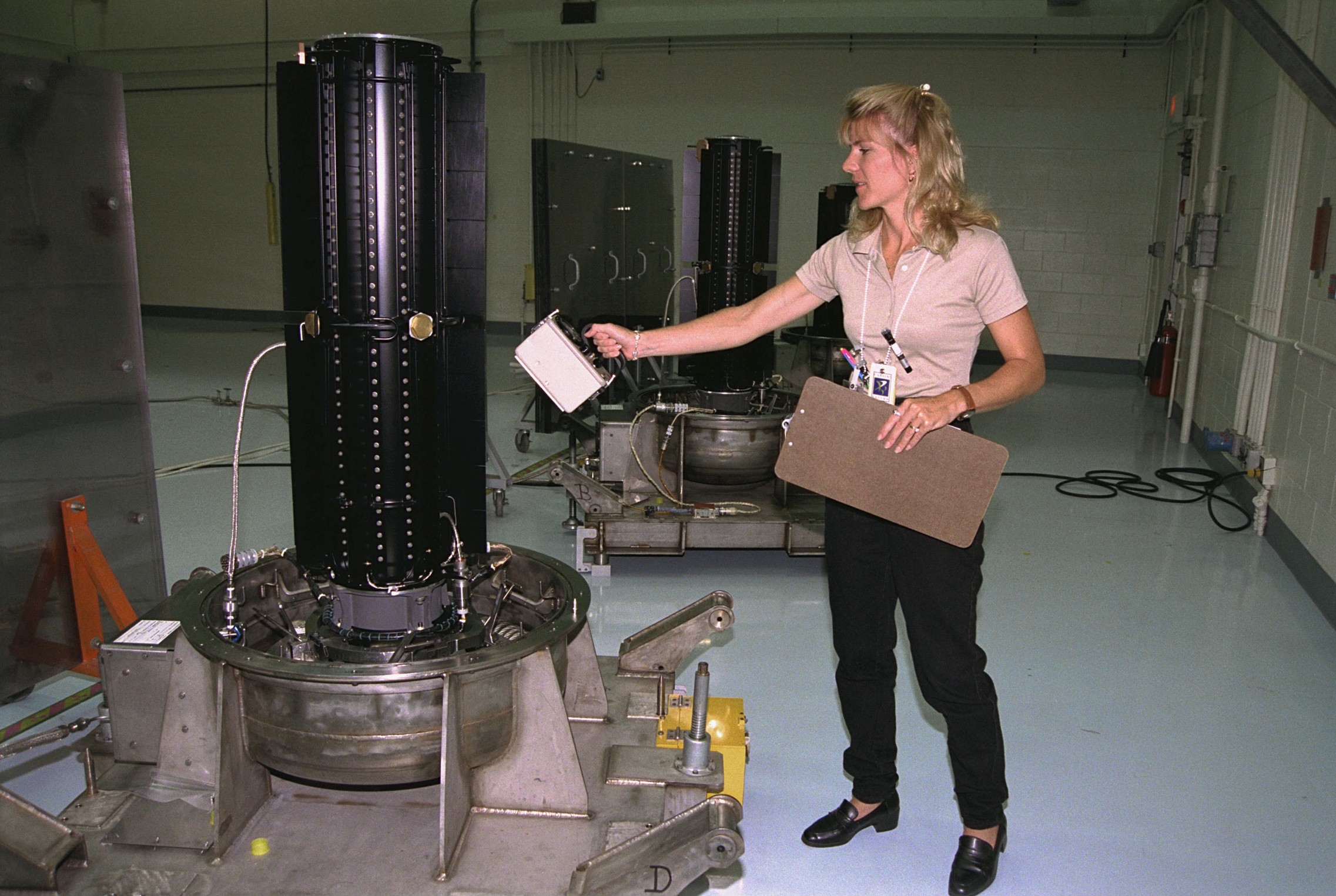
Inspection of Cassini spacecraft RTGs before launch

A radioisotope thermoelectric generator (RTG) is a simple electrical generator which converts heat into electricity from a radioisotope using an array of thermocouples.

^{238}Pu has become the most widely used fuel for RTGs, in the form of plutonium dioxide. It has a half-life of 87.7 years, reasonable energy density, and exceptionally low gamma and neutron radiation levels. Some Russian terrestrial RTGs have used ^{90}Sr; this isotope has a shorter half-life and a much lower energy density, but is cheaper. Early RTGs, first built in 1958 by the U.S. Atomic Energy Commission, have used ^{210}Po. This fuel provides phenomenally huge energy density, (a single gram of polonium-210 generates 140 watts thermal) but has limited use because of its very short half-life and gamma production, and has been phased out of use for this application.

=== Radioisotope heater unit (RHU) ===
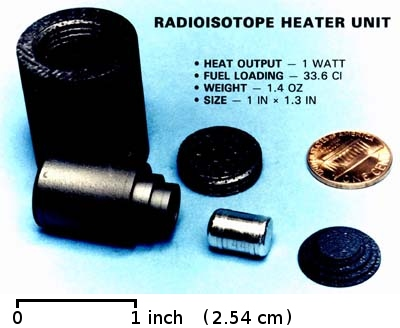
Photo of a disassembled RHU

A radioisotope heater unit (RHU) typically provides about 1 watt of heat each, derived from the decay of a few grams of plutonium-238. This heat is given off continuously for several decades.

Their function is to provide highly localised heating of sensitive equipment (such as electronics in outer space). The Cassini–Huygens orbiter to Saturn contains 82 of these units (in addition to its 3 main RTGs for power generation). The Huygens probe to Titan contains 35 devices.

== Fusion fuels ==
Fusion fuels are fuels usable in hypothetical fusion reactors. They include deuterium (^{2}H) and tritium (^{3}H) as well as helium-3 (^{3}He). Many other elements can be fused together, but the larger electrical charge of their nuclei means that much higher temperatures are required. Only the fusion of the lightest elements is seriously considered as a future energy source. Fusion of the lightest atom, ^{1}H hydrogen, as is done in the Sun and other stars, has also not been considered practical on Earth. Although the energy density of fusion fuel is even higher than fission fuel, and fusion reactions sustained for a few minutes have been achieved, utilizing fusion fuel for power generation remains only a theoretical possibility.

=== First-generation fusion fuel ===
Deuterium and tritium are both considered first-generation fusion fuels, as they are the easiest to fuse with current technology. The three most commonly cited nuclear reactions that could be used to generate energy are:

^{2}H + ^{3}H → n (14.07 MeV) + ^{4}He (3.52 MeV)

^{2}H + ^{2}H → n (2.45 MeV) + ^{3}He (0.82 MeV)

^{2}H + ^{2}H → p (3.02 MeV) + ^{3}H (1.01 MeV)

Deuterium is present in small concentrations in seawater, and can be readily extracted as heavy water. However, tritium is only present in trace quantities and must be manufactured artificially by bombarding lithium with neutrons from either a conventional fission reactor or a fusion reactor. Current proposals for fusion reactors incorporate a blanket containing lithium surrounding the core, to breed tritium for new fuel.

=== Second-generation fusion fuel ===
Second-generation fuels require either higher confinement temperatures or longer confinement time than those required of first-generation fusion fuels, but generate fewer neutrons. Neutrons are an unwanted byproduct of fusion reactions in an energy generation context, because they are absorbed by the walls of a fusion chamber, making them radioactive. They cannot be confined by magnetic fields, because they are not electrically charged. This group consists of deuterium and helium-3. The products are all charged particles, but there may be significant side reactions leading to the production of neutrons.

^{2}H + ^{3}He → p (14.68 MeV) + ^{4}He (3.67 MeV)

=== Third-generation fusion fuel ===
Third-generation fusion fuels produce only charged particles in the primary reactions, and side reactions are relatively unimportant. Since a very small amount of neutrons is produced, there would be little induced radioactivity in the walls of the fusion chamber. This is often seen as the end goal of fusion research. ^{3}He has the highest Maxwellian reactivity of any 3rd generation fusion fuel. However, there are no significant natural sources of this substance on Earth.

^{3}He + ^{3}He → 2 p + ^{4}He (12.86 MeV)

Another potential aneutronic fusion reaction is the proton-boron reaction:

p + ^{11}B → 3 ^{4}He (8.7 MeV)

Under reasonable assumptions, side reactions will result in about 0.1% of the fusion power being carried by neutrons. With 123 keV, the optimum temperature for this reaction is nearly ten times higher than that for the pure hydrogen reactions, the energy confinement must be 500 times better than that required for the D-T reaction, and the power density will be 2500 times lower than for D-T.

== See also ==
- Integrated Nuclear Fuel Cycle Information System
- International Framework for Nuclear Energy Cooperation
- List of countries by thorium resources
- List of countries by uranium reserves
- Nuclear fuel bank
- Reprocessed uranium
- Special nuclear material
- Uranium market
