= ARMF-II =

Advanced Reactivity Measurement Facility II (ARMF-II) was a research reactor which was located at the Argonne National Laboratory, a United States Department of Energy national laboratory, facility located in the high desert of southeastern Idaho between Idaho Falls, Idaho and Arco, Idaho. ARMF-II was nearly identical to ARMF-I.

== History ==
The ARMF-II, a reactor located in a small pool in a building east of the MTR in the Test Reactor Area, was used to determine the nuclear characteristics of reactor fuels and other materials subject to testing in the MTR. Together with the MTR, the reactor helped improve the performance, reliability, and quality of reactor core components. It had a “readout” system which automatically recorded measurements on IBM data cards. This refinement over the ARMF-I meant that operators could process data quickly in electronic computers. Designers of the ARMF-II benefitted from previous experience with the ARMF-I and the Reactivity Measurement Facility.

The Advanced Reactivity Measurement Facilities, ARMF-I and ARMF-II, were nearly identical critical facilities and were used almost exclusively for measuring reactor physics parameters, such as reactor-spectrum cross sections and resonance integral cross sections. They were designed to (a) have large statistical weights for fuels and poisons, (b) be mechanically stable enough to produce reproducible reactivity measurements, and (c) have sensitive instrumentation capable of measuring very small reactivities.

ARMF-II began operation on October 10, 1960 and ceased operation sometime prior to 2000.

== Design ==
ARMF-I and ARMF-II were near identical pool reactors. The greatest difference between the two ARMF reactors was that ARMF-II had a “readout” system which automatically recorded measurements on IBM data cards. This refinement over the ARMF-I meant that operators could process data quickly in electronic computers. ARMF-I and ARMF-II were housed in a 40-foot by 60-foot cinder block building located just east of the MTR canal tunnel; the building was designed from the initial concept for two reactors. These facilities were swimming-pool-type reactors with light-water moderated cores made up of plate-type fuel elements containing high enriched uranium at 93% U-235. The facilities were located at the National Reactor Testing Station near the Materials Testing Reactor (MTR). Being located near the MTR permitted measurements of short-lived fission products and transmuted isotopes. By use of the capsule 'transfer tube' connecting the MTR and ARMF canals, a capsule could be transferred from the MTR hydraulic rabbit to the ARMF and prepared for reactivity measurements in 15 minutes.

== Bibliography ==
- Stacy, Susan M. “Proving the Principle.” Idaho Operations Office of the Department of Energy. Idaho Falls, Idaho. DOE/ID-10799. 2000. Retrieved from: https://factsheets.inl.gov/SitePages/Publications.aspx
- This article incorporates text from the public domain (prepared by or on behalf of the US government) work “Proving the Principle” (2000) which may be found at: https://factsheets.inl.gov/SitePages/Publications.aspx.

== See also ==
- Argonne National Laboratory
- Idaho National Laboratory
- List of nuclear research reactors § United States
