= Astrid =

Female given name

- Gender: Female
- Name day: 27 November

Origin
- Origin: Old Norse
- Region of origin: Fennoscandia

Astrid is a given name of Scandinavian origin, a modern form of the name Ástríðr. Derived from the Old Norse Ássfriðr, a compound name composed of the elements áss (a god) and fríðr (beautiful, fair).

== Variants ==
- Astrit
- Assan (diminutive) (Swedish)
- Asta (diminutive) (Swedish, Norwegian, Danish, Estonian, Finnish, Lithuanian)
- Astrid (Swedish, Dutch, Danish, German, Norwegian, Estonian, French, Spanish)
- Astri (Norwegian)
- Astrida (Lithuanian)
- Astride (French, Portuguese)
- Ástríður (Icelandic)
- Astrithr (North Germanic)
- Astrud (Brazilian Portuguese)
- Ásta (Icelandic)
- Ástride, Astride (Portuguese)
- Sassa (diminutive) (Swedish)

== Notable people ==
=== Arts and culture ===
- Astrid Roelants, Belgian singer known professionally as Ameerah
- Astrid Allwyn (1905–1978), American actress
- Àstrid Bergès-Frisbey, Catalan-French actress
- Astrid Carolina Herrera (born 1963), Venezuelan actress and Miss World 1984
- Astrid Hadad (born 1957), Mexican vocalist and performance artist
- Astrud Gilberto (1940–2023), Brazilian singer
- Astrid Holm (1893–1961), Danish stage and film actress
- Astrid Jorgensen, New Zealand-Australian vocalist, conductor and composer
- Astrid Kannel (born 1967), Estonian television journalist
- Astrid Kirchherr (1938–2020), German photographer and artist, known for her association with The Beatles
- Astrid Lindgren (1907–2002), Swedish author of children's literature, among others Pippi Longstocking
- Astrid Lepa (1924–2015), Estonian actress and director
- Astrid Noack (1888–1957), Danish sculptor
- Astrid North (1973–2019), German soul singer
- Astrid Reinla (1948–1995), Estonian writer
- Astrid Roemer (1947–2026), Surinamese-Dutch writer and teacher
- Astrid S (born Astrid Smeplass in 1996), Norwegian singer and songwriter
- Astrid Sartiasari (born 1982), Indonesian singer
- Astrid Varnay (1918–2006), Swedish-born operatic soprano
- Astrid Villaume (1923–1995), Danish actress
- Astrid Williamson, Scottish musician
- Astrid Zydower (1930–2005), British sculptor

=== Politics and Royalty ===
- Astrid Eiriksdotter (born c. 925), consort of Tryggve Olafsson
- Astrid Gjertsen (1928–2020), Norwegian politician
- Astrid Hanzalek (1928–2019), American politician
- Astrid Krag (born 1982), Danish politician, member of parliament for the Socialist People's Party (SF)
- Astrid Løken (1911–2008), Norwegian entomologist and member of the Norwegian resistance movement during World War II
- Astrid Lulling (born 1929), Luxembourg politician and Member of the European Parliament
- Astrid Njalsdotter (died 1060), Swedish queen, consort of King Edmund the Old
- Astrid Olofsdotter (died 1035), Queen Consort of King Olav II of Norway
- Astrid Schramm (born 1956), German politician
- Astrid Thors (born 1957), Finnish politician
- Princess Astrid of Belgium, Archduchess of Austria-Este (born 1962), daughter of Albert II, sister of current king Philippe I
- Princess Astrid of Norway (1932–2026), sister to King Harald V of Norway
- Queen Astrid of the Belgians (1905–1935), Swedish princess and first wife of King Leopold III of the Belgians
- Princess Astrid of Liechtenstein (born 1968), wife of Prince Alexander of Liechtenstein
- Princess Marie-Astrid of Liechtenstein (born 1987), daughter of Prince Nikolaus of Liechtenstein

=== Science ===
- Astrid Beckmann (born 1957), German physicist
- Astrid Brousselle, Canadian professor of evaluation theories in healthcare economics
- Astrid Cleve (1875–1968), Swedish botanist, chemist, geologist, and researcher
- Astrid Linder, Swedish researcher in motor vehicle safety

=== Sports ===
- Astrid Ayling (born 1951), German and British rower
- Astrid Crabo (born 1971), Swedish badminton player
- Astrid Guyart (born 1983), French fencer
- Astrid Kumbernuss (born 1970), champion German shot putter and discus thrower
- Astrid Lødemel (born 1971), Norwegian alpine skier
- Astrid Sandvik (born 1939), Norwegian skier
- Astrid Strauss (born 1968), freestyle swimmer for East Germany
- Astrid Uhrenholdt Jacobsen (born 1987), Norwegian cross-country skier
- Astrid van Koert (born 1970), Dutch rower

=== Other ===
- Astrid Blume (1872–1924), Danish educator and temperance advocate
- Astrid Medina (born 1977), Colombian coffee producer
- Astrid Perry-Indermaur, Australian activist
- Astrid Holleeder (born 1965), sister to Dutch criminal Willem Holleeder and author
- Astrid Rosing Sawyer (1874–1954), Danish-born Chicago businesswoman, translator

== Fictional characters ==
- Astrid, a Danish countess in Wallace Stegner's 1976 novel The Spectator Bird
- Astrid, a minor character in Adventure Time: Fionna and Cake
- Astrid, a shield-maiden in the TV series Vikings
- Astrid, a skywing elf in the animated TV series The Dragon Prince
- Astrid, an assassin in the video game The Elder Scrolls V: Skyrim
- Astrid, Juliet Darling's best friend in the drama TV series Dirty Sexy Money
- Astrid Beck, a female wizard NPC played by Matthew Mercer in the web series Critical Role
- Astrid Bjorklundson, a minor character in the animated TV series The Loud House
- Astrid Bloom, an antagonist in Emma Frost's comic book series by Marvel Comics
- Astrid Deetz, a character in the Tim Burton's fantasy film Beetlejuice Beetlejuice, a sequel to Beetlejuice (1988)
- Astrid Ellison, a protagonist in the Gone book series by Michael Grant
- Astrid Everdeen (née March), mother of The Hunger Games protagonist, Katniss Everdeen
- Astrid Farnsworth, a protagonist in the sci-fi TV series Fringe
- Astrid Ferrier, the protagonist in the 1967–1968 Doctor Who serial The Enemy of the World
- Astrid Finch, a character in the TV series The Tomorrow People
- Dr. Astrid Greenwood, a protagonist in the video game The Long Dark
- Astrid Hofferson, a protagonist in the How to Train Your Dragon film series
- Astrid Kar, Xenon's mother in Kenneth Johnson's 1999 sci-fi film Zenon: Girl of the 21st Century (film) and its sequels, Zenon: The Zequel and Zenon: Z3
- Astrid Larsson, a character in S.M. Stirling's The Emberverse series
- Astrid Leong, a protagonist in Kevin Kwan's 2013 novel Crazy Rich Asians
- Astrid Levinson, a minor character on NBC's The Office
- Astrid Magnussen, the troubled teen protagonist of Janet Fitch's 1999 novel White Oleander
- Astrid Nielsen, a protagonist in the French TV series Astrid et Raphaëlle played by actress Sara Mortensen
- Astrid O'Hara, a minor character in the Australian sitcom Ja'mie: Private School Girl
- Astrid Peth, the companion in the 2007 Christmas special Voyage of the Damned (Doctor Who)
- Astrid Thomas, a Tremere vampire in the trading card game Vampire: The Eternal Struggle
- Astrid Weissman, sister-in-law to Midge Maisel in the TV series The Marvelous Mrs. Maisel
- Astrid Zexis, an alchemist in Atelier (video game series)

== See also ==
- Astrit
- Astrid (disambiguation)
- Astrud
- Estrid, 11th-century Swedish woman whose saga is immortalized on six or seven runestones
