= SNR-300 =

Fast breeder reactor in Germany, never entered service

Coordinates: 51°45′47″N 6°19′37″E

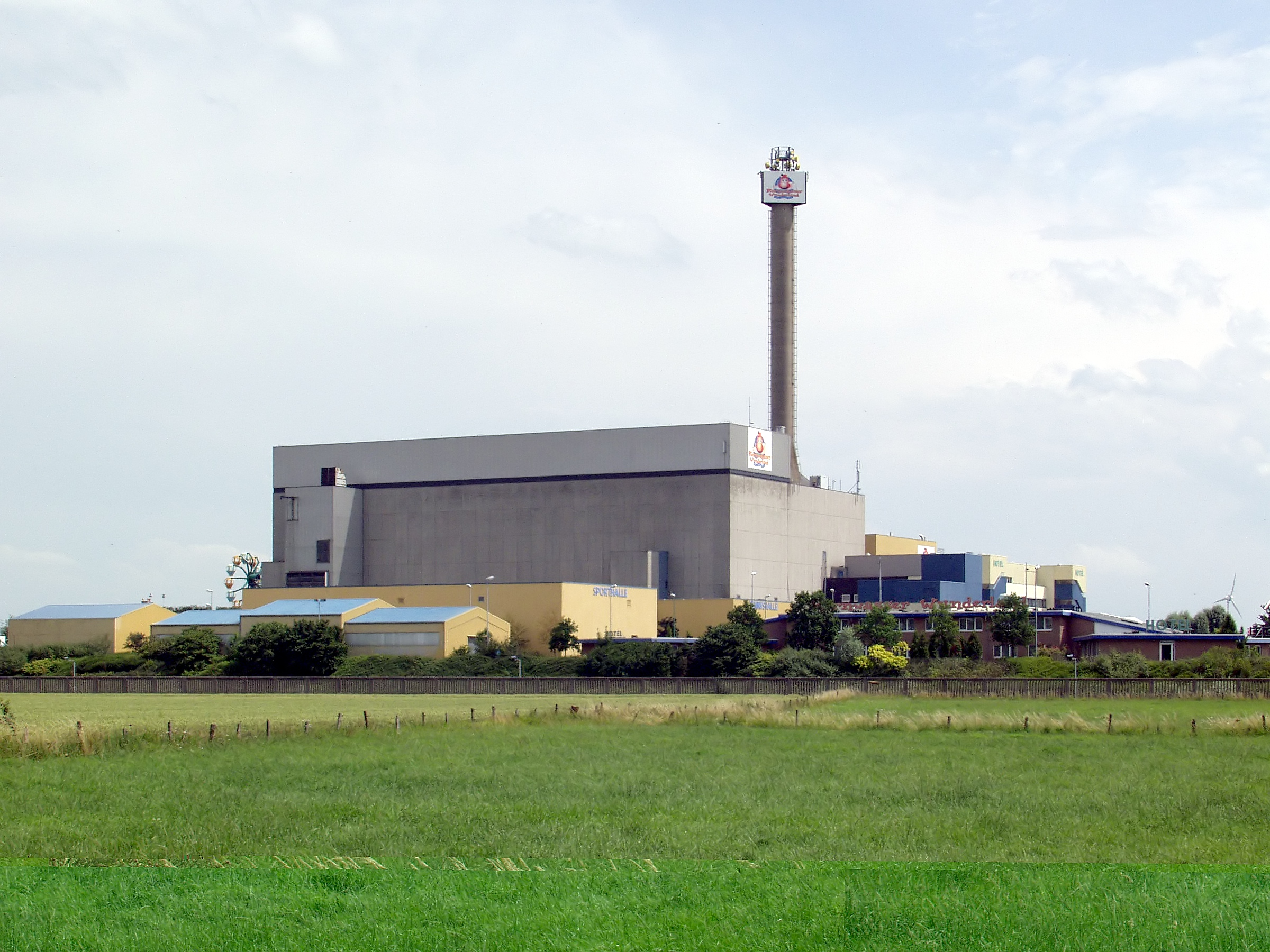
The reactor on the left, the vent stack on the right

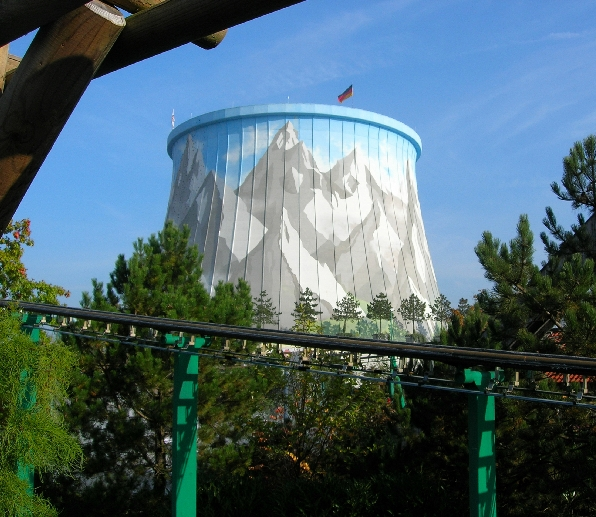
Schneller Brüter Kalkar, fast breeder reactor SNR-300, now an amusement park

The SNR-300 was a fast breeder sodium-cooled nuclear reactor built near the town of Kalkar, North Rhine-Westphalia, Germany. The reactor was completed but never taken online. SNR-300 was to output 327 megawatts. The project cost about 7 billion Deutsche Mark (about €3.5 billion or over $4 billion). Due to safety and political concerns, the project was abandoned in 1991. The high costs of construction and required prospective maintenance rendered its continued operation unviable from an economic point of view. The site is now the location of a theme park, Wunderland Kalkar, which incorporates much of the power plant buildings into the scenery.

== Background ==
In France, CEA and EDF had started to build Phénix in 1968, which was powered up in December 1973. It was a pool-type liquid-metal fast breeder reactor cooled with liquid sodium and a small-scale (gross 264/net 233 MW_{e}) prototype fast breeder reactor, located at the Marcoule nuclear site, near Orange, France. Phénix had to be stopped for refueling every two months. Between 1990 and 1996, it was run sporadically. Despite this, Phénix, as a demonstrator was seen as a technical success.

When the project for the subsequent full-scale power-plant prototype Superphénix was started in 1986, it was generally felt that no more experimental FBT prototypes were needed. Superphénix, being a prototype reactor, demonstrated reliability issues and had a historical capacity factor of less than 14.4%. Many of these problems were solved over time, and by 1996 the prototype was reaching its design operational goals.

The Russian BN-600 reactor is a similar sodium-cooled fast breeder reactor, built at the Beloyarsk Nuclear Power Station, in Russia. Designed to generate electrical power of 600 MW in total, the plant dispatches 560 MW to the Middle Urals power grid. It has been in operation since 1980 and represents an evolution on the preceding BN-350 reactor. In 2014, a larger version of the reactor, the BN-800, began operation and reached full commercial operation in August 2016.

== Planning ==
In late 1972, Germany, Belgium and the Netherlands charged the Siemens subsidiary Interatom to build a fast breeder. The German government wanted to limit energy import, and a breeder facility was required to use the limited resources efficiently as the uranium supply in Germany was limited. The building commenced at the end of the same year.

On 20 May 1975, the Council of the European Communities established the Joint Undertaking 'Schnell-Brüter- Kernkraftwerksgesellschaft mbH' (SBK).

== Timeline ==
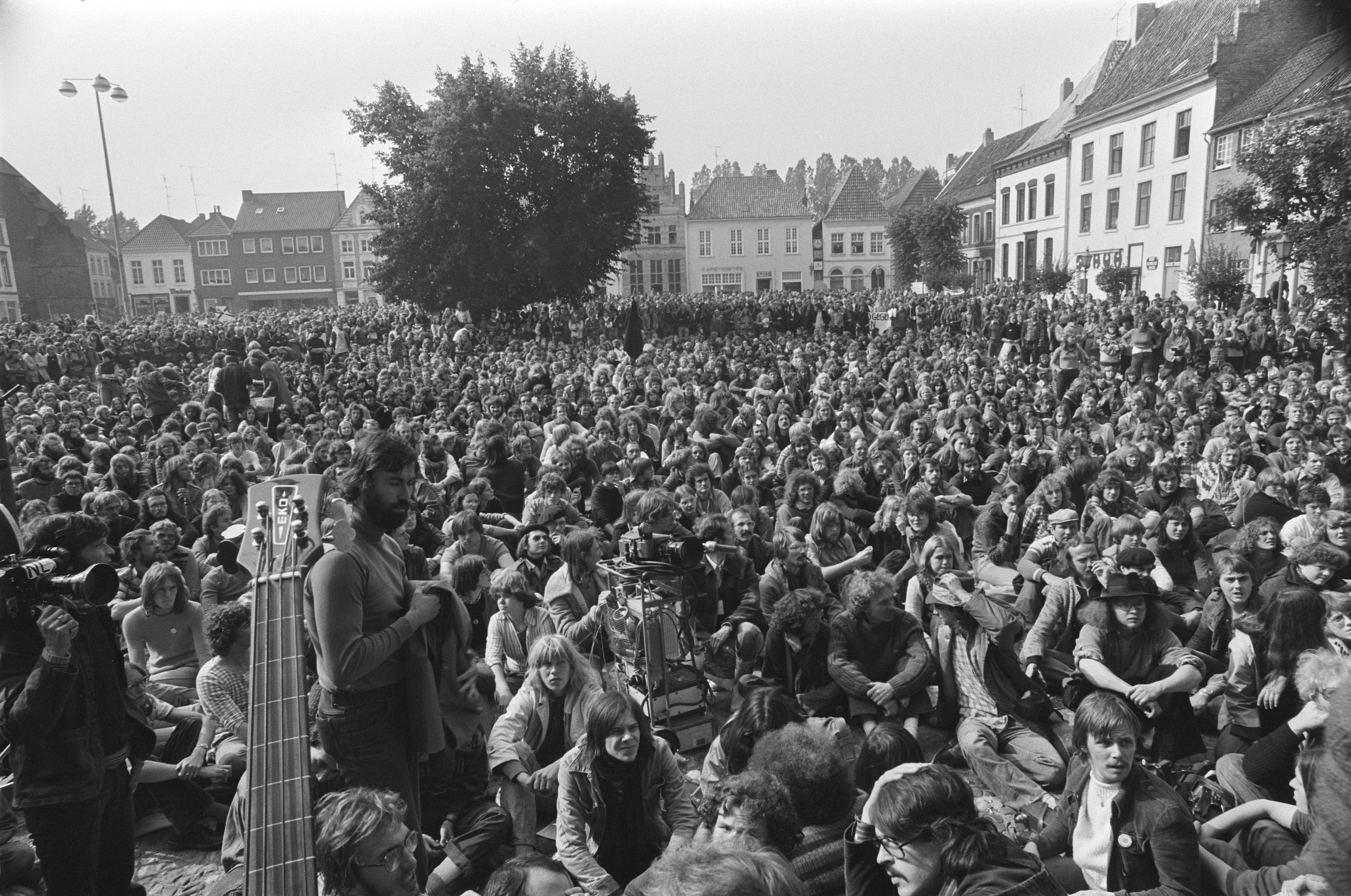
Massive protest in Kalkar, 1977

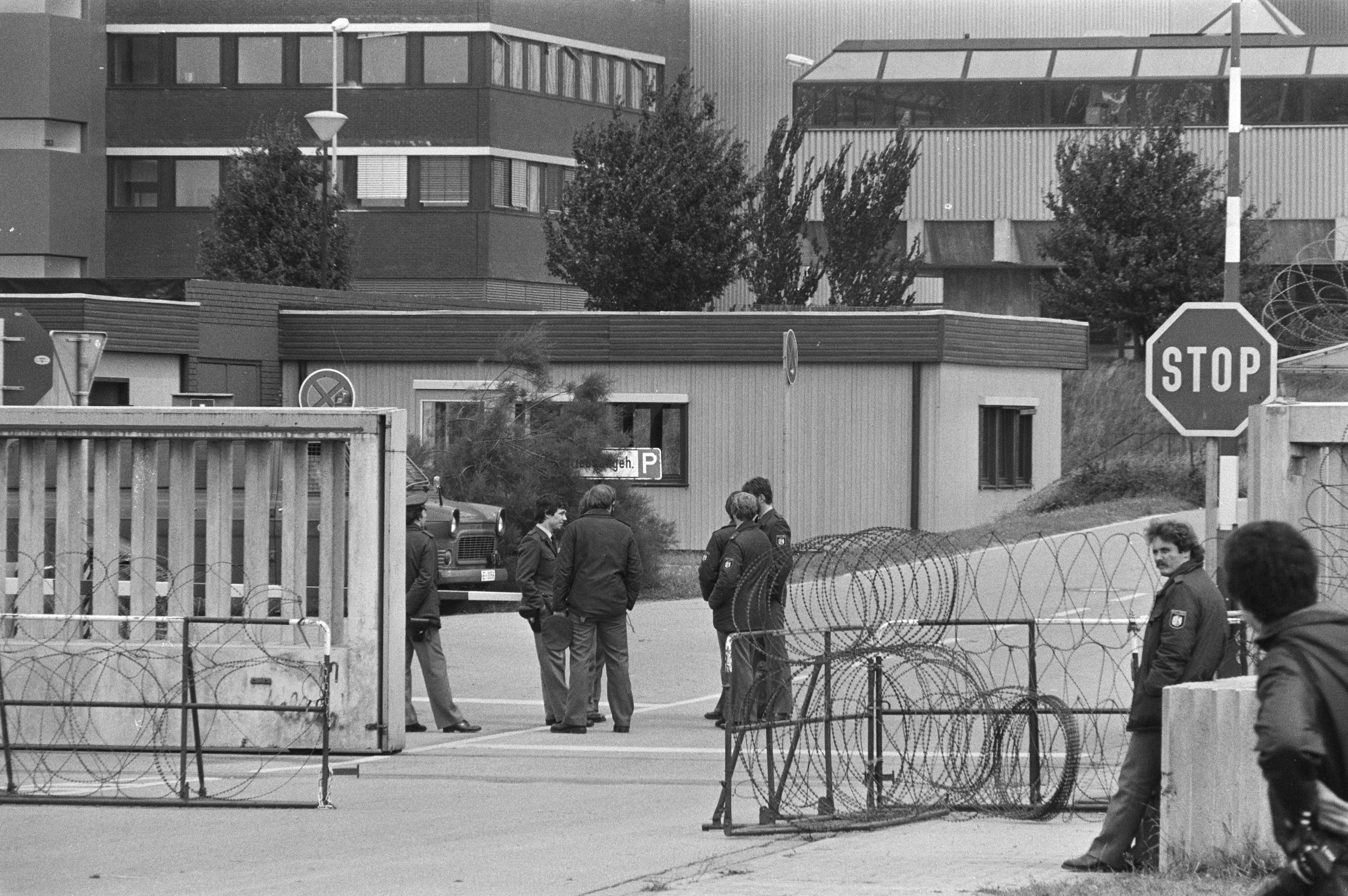
July 25 1981, security at the main gate

- 1972: The project commences.
- April 25, 1973: foundation stone ceremony
- September 28, 1974, protest demonstrations in Kalkar. Farmer Josef Maas was the main plaintiff. The protests and demonstrations that followed received many participants from the Netherlands.
- 1977: Increasing public doubt about the safety of nuclear energy culminates in the first protest, involving about 40,000 people marching in the streets of Kalkar.
- March 28, 1979: Three Mile Island suffers a partial meltdown and a local anti-nuclear movement causes open questioning of the project. This discussion leads to an inquiry by a commission of the Bundestag. Building is interrupted for 4 years as the commission concludes that the safety of the facility needs to be upgraded in light of the difficult to control process of fast breeders, along with concerns about the coolant (sodium, which can explode when in contact with water). The interruption along with the redesign of the safety features raise the costs of the project significantly. The local state government of North Rhine-Westphalia turns against the project.
- June 3, 1979: protest demonstrations in Kalkar
- Summer 1981: protest demonstrations in Kalkar
- October 2, 1982: protest demonstrations in Kalkar
- 1982: The Federal Chancellor of the Federal Republic of Germany Helmut Schmidt (SPD) is followed by Helmut Kohl (CDU).
- 1985: SNR-300 is completed. The reactor is taken into partial operation. The sodium coolant is already running through the coolant loop and has to be kept hot using electric heating elements so it does not solidify. The reactor is ready to receive nuclear materials. In this phase, the running costs are over €5 million per month. The state government (which has authority in matters of nuclear power and environmental issues) blocks the opening of the plant, against the wishes of the federal government. As elections are coming up (Bundestagswahl 25 January 1987), the German government unofficially decides not to take SNR-300 into operation just yet. At this point neither the country government, nor the local state government (MP from 1978 to 1998 was Johannes Rau) want the facility to become operational. Plans for a second facility, SNR-2, planned to produce 1,500 megawatts, are officially cancelled around this time. Farmer Maas retires from his role as main plaintiff.
- 26 April 1986: Chernobyl disaster.
- 1991: The official cancellation of the SNR-300 is offered on 21 March. The demolition of parts of the facility costs another 75 million euros. The unused machinery is put on sale. The reactor core is transferred to storage elsewhere. The breeder material, already bought for the operation of the facility, is transferred to France where it is mixed into MOX fuel, which is used by a number of France's nuclear reactors.
- early 1990s: 12 unused blanket fuel assemblies from SNR-300, containing depleted uranium, were transferred to James Acord and housed at Hanford Nuclear Reservation.

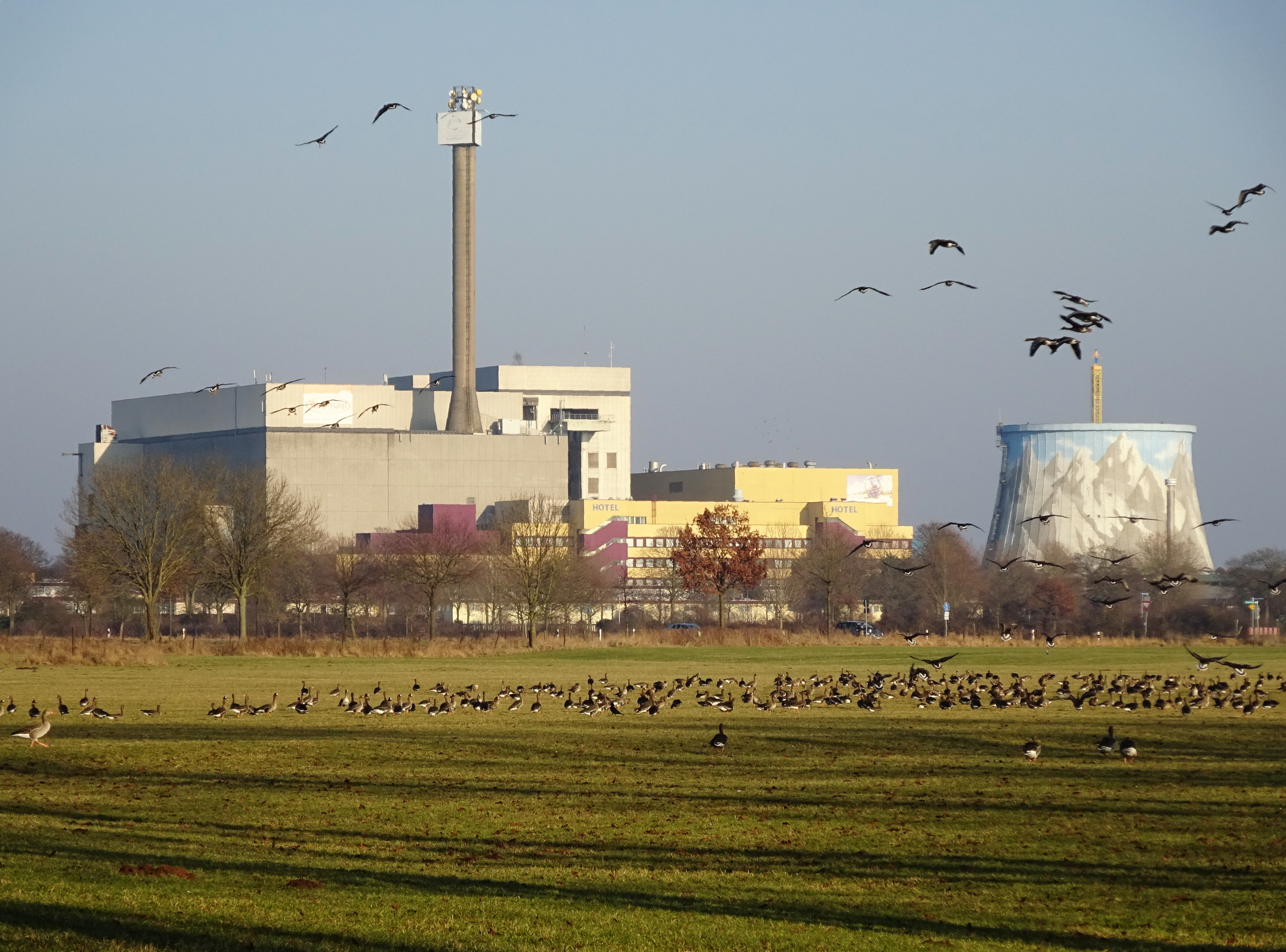
Wunderland Kalkar, 2017

- 1995: The facility is put up for auction by way of an announcement in the newspapers. The Dutch investor/developer Hennie van der Most buys the property for 2.5 million euros. The site is dismantled and transformed into an amusement park named Kernwasser Wunderland ("Nuclear water Wonderland"). It includes a hotel with 400 beds, and all inclusive tickets for families at the funfair.
- 2005: the facility is renamed into Wunderland Kalkar ("Wonderland Kalkar"). The area is enlarged with fields for outdoor events.
- 2022: the amusement park is sold to the Dutch company 'DeFabrique'.
