= ASTRID (reactor) =

Cancelled fast breeder reactor in France

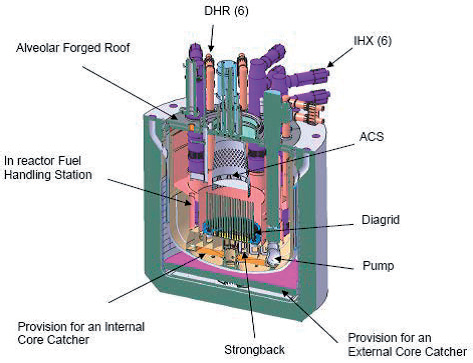
- Design de préconception du bloc réacteur ASTRID.
- Country: France
- Location: Marcoule Nuclear Site
- Coordinates: 44°08′34″N 4°42′32″E
- Status: Closed project
- Operator: CEA

Nuclear power station
- Reactor type: Sodium-cooled fast reactor (SFR)

Power generation
- Units planned: 1 x 600 MW
- Nameplate capacity: 600 MW

ASTRID (Advanced Sodium Technological Reactor for Industrial Demonstration) was a proposal for a 600 MW sodium-cooled fast breeder reactor (Generation IV), proposed by the Commissariat à l'énergie atomique (CEA). It was to be built on the Marcoule Nuclear Site in France. It was the successor of the three French fast reactors Rapsodie, Phénix and Superphénix.

The main goals of ASTRID were the multi-recycling of plutonium, aiming at preserving natural uranium resources, minor actinide transmutation, aiming at reducing nuclear waste, and an enhanced safety comparable to Generation III reactors, such as the EPR. It was envisaged as a 600 MW industrial prototype connected to the grid. A commercial series of 1500 MW SFR reactors was planned to be deployed around 2050.

As of 2012, the project involved 500 people, with almost half among industrial partners. Those included Électricité de France, Areva, Alstom Power Systems, Comex Nucléaire, Jacobs France, Toshiba and Bouygues Construction.

In 2014 Japan agreed to cooperate in developing the emergency reactor cooling system, and in a few other areas. As of 2016, France was seeking the full involvement of Japan in ASTRID development. In November 2018 France informed Japan it will halt joint development.

In August 2019 France cancelled ASTRID and sodium-breeder in general, with an official statement that “In the current energy market situation, the perspective of industrial development of fourth-generation reactors is not planned before the second half of this century. About €735 million had been spent on the project.

== See also ==
- Nuclear power in France
- Nuclear power in Japan
