= Melox =

Melox may also refer to:

- Melox (French: Mélange d'Oxydes), part of the Marcoule Nuclear Site, France
- Melox 2, a planned nuclear plant, at La Hague site France
- Meloxicam, a nonsteroidal anti-inflammatory drug
