= Astrid (application) =

Task management application

- Developer: Astrid Inc.
- Release: 2008
- Operating system: Android, iOS, web
- Platform: Cross-platform
- Type: Task management software
- License: Proprietary

Astrid was a multi-platform to-do list and task management application that was created in San Francisco, CA in 2008. It was identified by the company's octopus icon. The service reminded users of scheduled tasks and was designed for limited integration with Google Calendar. Yahoo! acquired the company on May 1, 2013 and shuttered the Astrid service on August 5, 2013.

== History ==
In 2008, Tim Su and Jon Paris co-founded Astrid in San Francisco, CA.

In 2011, Astrid attend the AngelPad startup accelerator. Later that year, they raised a seed round of venture capital from Google Ventures having had 1.5 million downloads and 250,000 monthly active users.

In May 2013, Astrid co-founder and CEO Jon Paris announced on the company's blog on May 1 that Yahoo! had acquired Astrid.

In an early July 2013 announcement, the public was made aware of Yahoo's scheduled closure of the task management service Astrid.

Yahoo discontinued the service on August 5, 2013. The team at Astrid supplied its customers with a data export tool and recommended former competitors such as Any.do, Sandglaz, Wrike, and Wunderlist.

In 2014, the source code for the Android app was forked to create Tasks.org, an independent to-do list app for Android.

== See also ==
- Astrid
- Astrid (disambiguation)
- List of Yahoo-owned sites and services
