= Astrid (disambiguation) =

Astrid is a female given name.

Astrid may also refer to:

== Places ==
- 1128 Astrid, an asteroid
- Astrid Park, an urban park in Brussels, Belgium

== Technology ==
- Astrid (application), a cross-platform to-do list application
- ASTRID (reactor), a French Sodium-cooled fast reactor built expected to be built to replace the Phénix reactor
- Astrid (satellite), two scientific microsatellites developed by the Swedish Space Corporation
- ASTRID, a research particle storage ring at Aarhus, Denmark

== Other uses ==
- Astrid (band), a band from the Isle of Lewis
- Astrid (brig), a tall ship that sank in July 2013
- Astrid (Antwerp premetro station), a station in the Antwerp premetro network
- Astrid et Raphaëlle, French-Belgian crime drama television series aired in the United States as simply Astrid
- Astrid, an early alias and given name of singer Ameerah
- "Astrid", a 2020 song by musician Glaive
- Astrid, a fictional starship in Ground Control and Ground Control 2: Operation Exodus

== See also ==
- SNCF Class BB 36000 or Astride, a locomotive
