= Sodium-cooled fast reactor =

Type of nuclear reactor cooled by molten sodium

Diagram of a pool-type sodium-cooled fast reactor (SFR)

A sodium-cooled fast reactor (SFR) is a fast neutron reactor cooled by liquid sodium. It offers several advantages over light-water reactors (LWRs), including high thermal efficiency and power density. A fast spectrum allows SFRs to destroy transuranic waste products in the spent fuel of LWRs, significantly reducing the quantity and lifetime of radioactive waste. The primary disadvantage is sodium's chemical reactivity, which requires special precautions to prevent and suppress fires.

An SFR uses liquid metallic sodium to carry heat from the reactor core. Sodium's low melting point and high boiling point allow a sodium-cooled reactor to operate at high temperature while remaining at atmospheric pressure. The elimination of pressurized coolant effectively eliminates the risk of a loss-of-coolant accident, while the higher-temperature operation provides better thermal efficiency than light-water reactors. There are two main design approaches to sodium-cooled fast reactors. In pool-type reactors, the intermediate heat exchanger is contained within the reactor vessel, whereas in loop-type reactors, it is located outside the reactor vessel.

As fast-neutron reactors, sodium-cooled fast reactors require nuclear fuel with a higher enrichment to attain criticality than thermal reactors like LWRs. Some SFR designs are breeder reactors, and can produce more fissile plutonium fuel than they consume. However, concerns over the proliferation risk of plutonium fuel are a significant obstacle to the deployment of fast reactors, including SFRs.

The first SFR, and the first nuclear reactor to generate electricity, was the Experimental Breeder Reactor I (EBR-I), which achieved criticality in 1950. Following the success of EBR-I, several additional experimental SFRs were constructed in the United Kingdom, Japan, and France, and a larger prototype in the US. More than 20 SFRs have been operated globally since 1950. Commercial SFRs have been in operation since 1963 with Fermi 1, and several commercial SFRs are under construction as of 2026, including a CFR-600 in China and the Natrium and Aurora reactors in the United States.

== History ==
The concept of a fast-neutron reactor cooled by liquid metal was first demonstrated at Los Alamos with the construction of the Clementine reactor in 1946. The first nuclear reactor to generate electricity was the Experimental Breeder Reactor I (EBR-I), which achieved criticality in 1950. EBR-I was a 0.2 MW_{e} fast reactor cooled by liquid sodium-potassium alloy, and demonstrated the concept of nuclear breeding. It also established sodium as the coolant of choice for fast reactors. However, the reactor experienced a partial meltdown in 1955, which required the core to be removed and replaced.

Following the success of EBR-I, several additional experimental SFRs were constructed. The United Kingdom Atomic Energy Authority built the Dounreay Fast Reactor (DFR), which achieved criticality in 1962, while the US Atomic Energy Commission (AEC) built a larger 20 MW_{e} prototype SFR, the Experimental Breeder Reactor II (EBR-II). EBR-II is considered the most successful US fast reactor, and demonstrated the feasibility of an SFR power plant. The DFR, as well as the French Rapsodie and Japanese Jōyō test reactors all served as prototypes for larger commercial plants.

=== Commercial SFRs ===
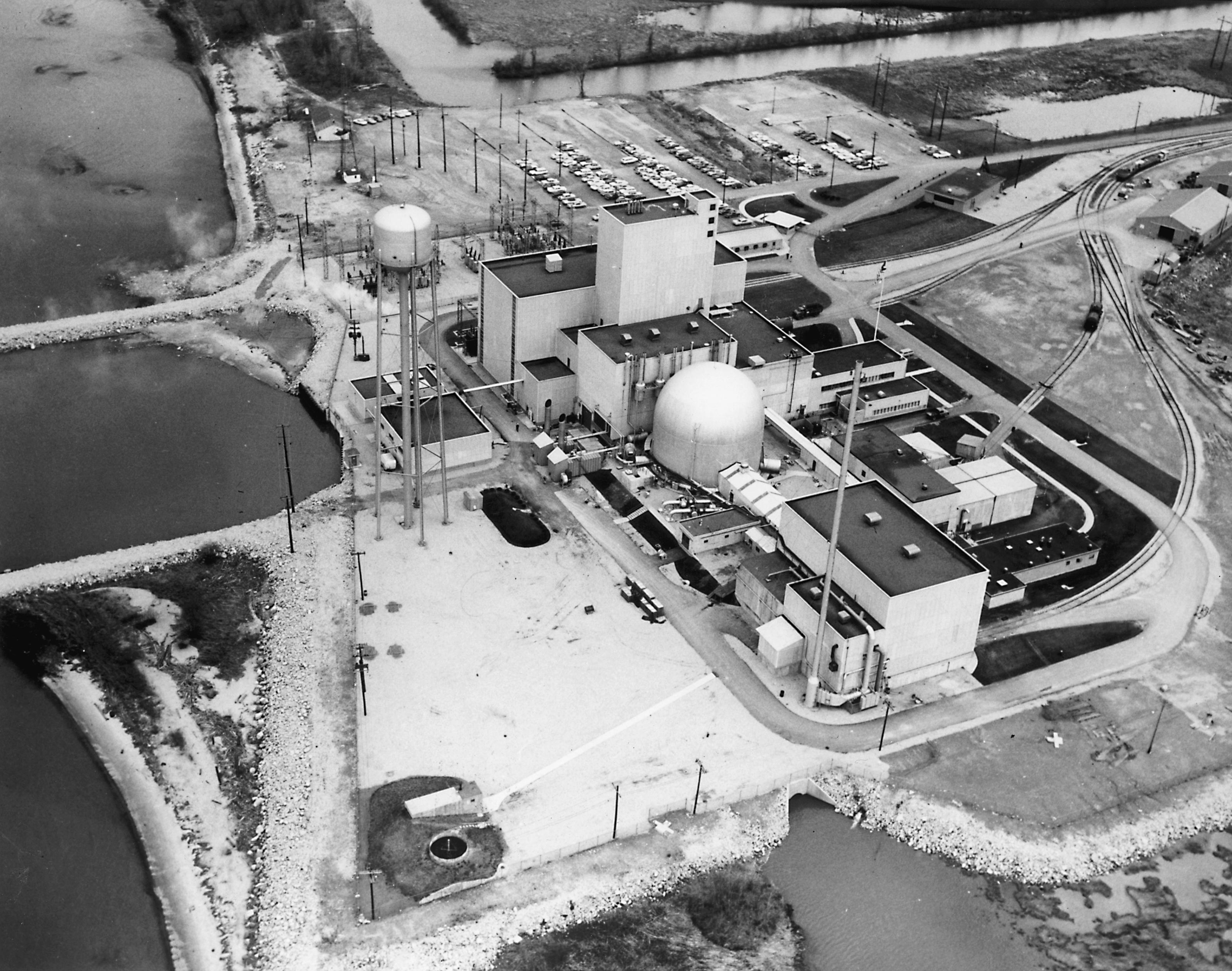
Fermi 1, the first commercial sodium-cooled fast reactor

The first commercial SFR, and first commercial breeder reactor, was the 66 MW_{e} Fermi 1 reactor built in 1963 under the Power Reactor Demonstration Program. This reactor was based on the design of EBR-I, and experienced a similar partial meltdown in 1966. Fermi 1 was shut down for repairs until 1970, after which it operated until 1972.

In the 1960s, the US AEC embarked on a significant program to build commercial liquid metal-cooled fast breeder reactors, eventually being declared the country's highest-priority energy program in 1969. This program culminated in the Clinch River Breeder Reactor Project (CRBRP), which aimed to build a 300 MW_{e} demonstration SFR. The CRBRP experienced significant delays, and became the center of a large political battle of the future of nuclear energy leading to its cancellation in 1983. This decision effectively ended breeder research in the United States.

Following the cancellation of the CRBRP, the US program was refocused on the concept of an Integral Fast Reactor (IFR), an inherently safe SFR that would incorporate on-site fuel reprocessing to close the nuclear fuel cycle. EBR-II was used to investigate the inherent safety characteristics of SFRs as part of the IFR program, and successfully demonstrated safe removal of decay heat via natural circulation in the sodium coolant. However, the IFR program was terminated in 1994 by the Clinton Administration before a demonstration plant could be constructed, and EBR-II was shut down as well.

France constructed the Phénix demonstration SFR in 1973, and the larger commercial Superphénix in 1985. Superphénix was the largest SFR ever constructed, at 1242 MW_{e}. It experienced technical issues and significant political opposition, and was closed in 1998 for political reasons. The closure of Superphénix led to the refocusing of the French nuclear program to light-water reactors instead of fast breeders. Germany constructed the 327 MW SNR-300 fast breeder reactor in 1985, however it suffered significant political backlash and was never taken online. The reactor was officially cancelled in 1991.

Japan invested heavily in sodium-cooled fast breeder reactors beginning in the late 1960s, to reduce its near-total dependence on imported fuels. In the 1960s, it was commonly believed that that uranium supplies would run out relatively quickly, and that breeder reactors were necessary to extend the fuel supply. However, the global supply of uranium never became endangered. Unlike other countries, the Japanese breeder program was noted as having persisted despite the predicted uranium shortage never materializing. Jōyō, an experimental SFR, was constructed starting in 1970 and started operating in 1977.

Following the success of Jōyō, a larger demonstrator, the 280 MW_{e} Monju Nuclear Power Plant, was built between 1986 and 1994. In 1995, while at 43% power for a system start-up test, a broken temperature sensor caused a leak of sodium from the secondary cooling loop. Monju's operator, the government-run Power Reactor and Nuclear Fuel Development Corporation (PNC), took more than 90 minutes to shut down the reactor. The operators failed to stop the reactor immediately and drain the secondary sodium loop, causing over 640 kg of sodium to leak and catch fire. The fire caused no injuries, but caused damage to the cooling system that required several years of repairs. Following the fire, PNC attempted to cover up the incident by tampering with videotapes of the incident response, and fabricated accident information. The exposure of the coverup a few weeks later caused national outrage. Several experts have described the political damage as far more severe than the physical damage. The fire, and especially the subsequent coverup, heavily damaged the Japanese public's confidence in both the breeder program and in nuclear energy.

Monju was shut down until 2010, both due to repairs and a lawsuit aiming to block the restart. Following restart, and just after refueling, the reactor's fuel handling machine fell into the reactor vessel, and could not be retrieved until the following year. The damaged machine was replaced, however the Nuclear Regulation Authority did not permit the reactor to restart, ruling in 2015 that PNC was too incompetent to operate the plant. Monju was closed permanently in 2016. This decision marked the effective end of the breeder program.

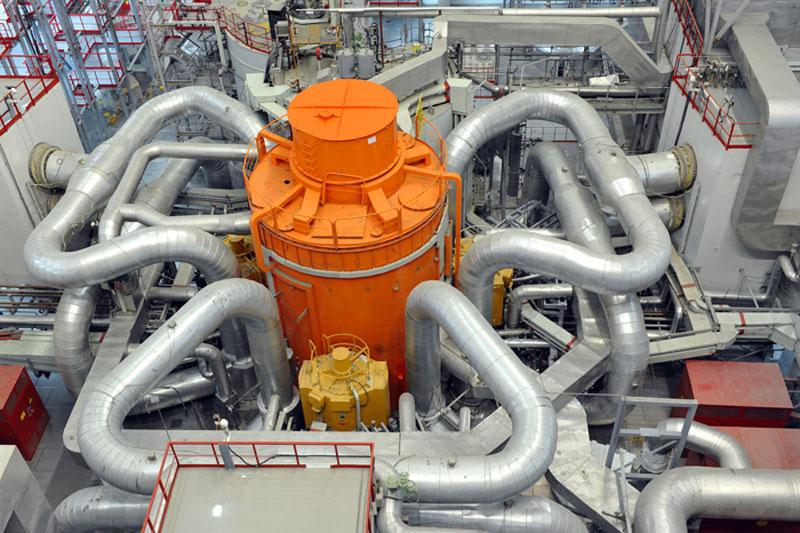
The BN-800 reactor in Russia, a pool-type SFR, has operated successfully since 2014

The Soviet Union constructed multiple commercial SFRs at the Beloyarsk Nuclear Power Station, starting with the BN-350 reactor. The BN-350 operated between 1972 and 1999 and produced both electricity and process heat for desalination. Two additional SFRs, BN-600 and BN-800, came online in 1980 and 2014, and are considered commercially successful. As of 2024, the BN-800 reactor has a capacity factor above 80% and has successfully demonstrated the burning of surplus plutonium.

Strong interest in the breeder cycle was driven primarily by an expected shortage of uranium resources. However, this shortage never materialized and the light-water reactor eventually dominated the market while the construction of SFRs stalled. An exception is India, which lacks significant uranium resources and has pursued breeder reactors as part of India's three-stage nuclear power programme. The second stage of this plan calls for the construction of commercial SFR plants that can breed fissile plutonium and uranium-233 for use in heavy-water reactors. The experimental Fast Breeder Test Reactor, based on the French Rapsodie design, was constructed starting in 1972 and has remained operational since 1985. A demonstration-scale reactor, the 500 MWe Prototype Fast Breeder Reactor, started construction in 2004 and was completed in 2024 following significant delays. The reactor reached criticality in April 2026.

Concerns over nuclear weapons proliferation, particularly over the use of plutonium fuel, increased significantly in the 1970s following India's 1974 nuclear test. In the United States, proliferation considerations surrounding plutonium abounded during the Carter Administration, leading to the abandonment of US reprocessing in 1977. This position was further strengthened in the 1990s by the Clinton Administration, which shut down the Fast Flux Test Facility and largely abandoned fast reactor development.

Later SFR designs emphasized modular construction and passive safety features. The US Department of Energy ran an Advanced Liquid-Metal Reactor (ALMR) program in the 1980s and 1990s, resulting in the General Electric-designed PRISM reactor, a small modular SFR. PRISM introduced the use of factory-fabrication and multi-module plants to reduce the cost of building new reactors.

=== Generation IV SFRs ===
Following the ALMR, the Department of Energy founded the Generation IV International Forum (GIF) to commercialize advanced nuclear technologies. The GIF selected six reactor concepts for further development, including the Sodium-cooled Fast Reactor. The GIF specifically emphasized the waste-management and resource utilization abilities of the SFR as desirable.

China National Nuclear Corporation (CNNC) started building the first CFR-600 breeder reactor in 2017 at Xiapu, which finished in 2023. A second unit started construction in 2020.

US company TerraPower developed a type of travelling-wave SFR and planned to build a 600 MW_{e} demonstration unit with China National Nuclear Corporation in 2015. However, the project was cancelled in 2019 and the company shifted to developing a conventional pool-type SFR, Natrium, combining their travelling-wave reactor with the GE-Hitachi PRISM design. The reactor incorporates a molten-salt thermal energy storage system that allows it to vary its power output between 500 MWe and 100 MWe, while remaining at a constant 840 MWth thermal power output.

In 2020, TerraPower received an $80M grant from the US Department of Energy (DOE) for development of the Natrium SFR under the Advanced Reactor Demonstration Program. The Department of Energy later awarded $2 billion for the project by 2022. The company selected Kemmerer, Wyoming as the site for its first deployment in 2021, as Kemmerer Power Station Unit 1. TerraPower submitted a construction permit application to the Nuclear Regulatory Commission in 2024, and non-nuclear construction later that year. The NRC issued the construction permit for Kemmerer Unit 1 on March 4, 2026, and nuclear construction began on April 23.

In 2023, ARC Clean Technology Canada signed a memorandum of understanding with the Government of Alberta to support the deployment of the company's 100 MW_{e} ARC-100 modular SFR. The ARC-100 reactor completed a pre-licensing review with the Canadian Nuclear Safety Commission in 2025, and the company plans to construct its first unit at the Point Lepreau Nuclear Generating Station by 2029, in partnership with New Brunswick Power.

Oklo Inc. designed a 75 MWe pool-type SFR, the Aurora Powerhouse. The first unit, Aurora-INL, broke ground at Idaho National Laboratory in 2025 under DOE authorization. The company also plans to build a private fuel recycling facility in Tennessee, that will use electrochemical refining and pyroprocessing to recycle spent nuclear fuel.

== Design ==
=== Sodium coolant ===
A sodium-cooled fast reactor uses liquid metallic sodium to carry heat from the core. Sodium is an excellent heat-transfer fluid, and features a low melting point and high boiling point, allowing a sodium-cooled reactor to operate at high temperature while remaining at atmospheric pressure. The elimination of pressurized coolant effectively eliminates the risk of a loss-of-coolant accident, while the higher-temperature operation provides better thermal efficiency than light-water reactors.

Sodium boils at 892 °C (1,638 °F), which provides a margin-to-boiling of approximately 400 °C (752 °F), compared to 15 °C (59 °F) in a pressurized water reactor (PWR). At the same time, the difference in inlet and outlet temperatures is approximately 150 °C (302 °F) for an SFR and 30 °C (86 °F) in an LWR. The higher outlet temperature allows for a thermal efficiency around 40%, while the much larger temperature difference enables SFRs to easily rely on natural circulation for decay heat removal.

Sodium has a small neutron cross section compared to water, and is a poor neutron moderator. Water is a much stronger neutron moderator because the hydrogen atoms found in water are much lighter than metal atoms, and therefore neutrons lose more energy in collisions with hydrogen atoms. This makes it difficult to use water as a coolant for a fast reactor because the water tends to slow (moderate) the fast neutrons into thermal neutrons (although concepts for reduced moderation water reactors exist). The lack of moderation allows a sodium-cooled reactor to operate on a fast neutron spectrum, which provides significantly better neutron economy as well as higher core power density compared to a thermal reactor. The use of fast neutrons also enables the breeding of plutonium from uranium-238, as well as the transmutation of transuranic waste products from spent nuclear fuel. This reduces both the radiotoxicity and heat generation from nuclear waste, and significantly reduces its lifetime.

The largest issue with sodium coolant is its highly exothermic reaction with water or atmospheric oxygen. For this reason, the reactor vessel is filled with an inert gas, typically argon. Should a steam generator tube fail in a sodium-cooled reactor, pressurized steam would contact the hot sodium coolant and the resulting reaction could damage reactor components. Sodium has only one stable isotope, sodium-23, which is a weak neutron absorber. When it does absorb a neutron it produces sodium-24, which has a half-life of 15 hours and decays to stable isotope magnesium-24. This process emits penetrating gamma radiation, and means that the primary sodium coolant must be surrounded by shielding. While its short half-life means it is not an environmental pollutant, a leak of the primary cooling system and subsequent sodium fire would expose personnel to airborne radioactive sodium. To prevent a sodium-water reaction with the primary coolant, and to prevent radioactive sodium from entering the steam generation system, an intermediate loop must be used that uses a secondary sodium loop to transfer heat from the primary coolant to the steam generator.

Sodium rapidly oxidizes in contact with air, creating intense heat that can cause fires. Sodium fires occur either by producing sodium oxide or sodium peroxide, with the former being more common:

4Na + O_{2} → 2Na_{2}O
2Na + O_{2} → Na_{2}O_{2}

To mitigate the possibility of a radioactive sodium fire, the primary cooling system is enclosed within gas-tight cells filled with a reduced oxygen atmosphere. The primary sodium equipment is typically located underground as a secondary precaution. Piping is also double-walled, and enclosed within insulation to lessen potential leakage rates. An atmosphere with an oxygen content of 2% or less will quench sodium fires. The secondary cooling system is similarly contained within inert-gas cells or in cells filled with air. It can use cells filled with air since there is no radiological hazard associated with secondary sodium leaks. Concrete, which is used as a structural material, is porous and contains residual water. Sodium that contacts concrete will react with the water within. All rooms containing sodium piping are lined with steel plating to prevent sodium from contacting structural concrete.

Many sodium leaks and fires have occurred, and significant experience has been gained in dealing with them. As of 2012, no personal injuries have ever occurred as a result of sodium leaks or fires in an SFR.

=== Pool or loop type ===
Schematic diagram showing the difference between the pool and loop designs of a liquid metal fast breeder reactor

Because the primary sodium coolant will become radioactive during operation, an intermediate cooling loop is needed to separate radioactive sodium from the water in the power generation loop. There are therefore two main design approaches to sodium-cooled fast reactors, pool-type and loop-type.

In a pool-type SFR, the intermediate heat exchanger (IHX) is contained in the primary reactor vessel, surrounded by liquid sodium. This means that the radioactive primary sodium never leaves the reactor vessel. Because the only sodium leaving the vessel is the intermediate coolant, a pool-type SFR eliminates the risk of a radioactive sodium fire. The large inventory of sodium surrounding the core also allows for easier passive cooling. However, because the primary sodium pump and intermediate heat exchanger are located within the sodium pool, maintenance becomes much more difficult than a loop-type reactor. The US EBR-II, French Phénix/Superphénix and others used this approach, and it is used by India's PFBR and China's CFR-600.

In a loop-type SFR, the intermediate heat exchanger is located outside the primary reactor vessel, and the primary sodium is pumped out of the reactor vessel into the IHX. Such a design is generally simpler than a pool-type SFR, and leads to a smaller reactor vessel. Maintenance is also easier on a loop-type SFR because the primary pump and IHX are located outside the sodium pool. However, a loop-type SFR allows primary sodium to leave the reactor vessel, which introduces the possibility of a radioactive sodium fire. A smaller reactor vessel also contains a smaller sodium inventory, which can also reduce the safety margin for emergency cooling. The American Fermi 1, French Rapsodie, British PFR, Japanese Monju plant, and others used this approach.

=== Fuel ===
As fast-neutron reactors, sodium-cooled fast reactors require nuclear fuel with a higher enrichment to attain criticality than thermal reactors like light-water reactors. While LWRs use fuel containing between 3–5% fissile ^{235}U, SFRs require fuel with between 9–23% fissile material, including ^{235}U or ^{239}Pu. The most common fuel for SFRs is uranium-plutonium mixed-oxide fuel. Thorium-bearing fuel can also be used in an SFR to breed uranium-233. However, uranium and plutonium are preferred due to their higher breeding ratio and thus better economics.

Sodium-cooled fast reactors can use both ceramic and metallic fuel. These materials must withstand high burnup and provide high fissile atom density while withstanding high temperature and irradiation conditions. Metal fuel was used in early SFR prototypes, but issues with severe swelling under irradiation led to most SFRs using oxide fuel. As of 2025 the majority of existing SFRs use oxide fuel. Research on better metal fuels progressed rapidly during the US Integral Fast Reactor program in the 1980s. Metallic fuels capable of withstanding high burnup were developed as a result. In addition to oxides, other ceramics such as carbide and nitride fuel are under development. These compounds have high thermal conductivity, high fissile atom density, and high melting points. However, they also experience high irradiation swelling. Nitride fuel also has poor high-temperature stability compared to oxide fuel.

Oxide fuel became the most common SFR fuel because of its demonstrated ability to withstand high burnup. It also has a high melting point, however it possesses low thermal conductivity that results in high fuel temperatures. Metal fuel has the highest fissile atom density, which results in a high breeding ratio and thus a shorter doubling time than oxide fuel. Metal fuel has a lower melting point than ceramic fuels, but its significantly higher thermal conductivity largely compensates. Metal fuels have attracted significant interest for future SFRs because they are significantly easier to fabricate and reprocess compared to ceramic fuels. They are typically alloys of uranium, plutonium, and zirconium (U-Zr or U-Pu-Zr).

SFR fuel is typically formed into cylindrical pellets or rods, which are then stacked together inside fuel pins and bundled into assemblies. SFRs require high specific power and high fissile atom density, so their fuel is packed into thin tubes called fuel pins (as opposed to thicker tubes found in LWRs termed fuel rods).

Each fuel pin consists of a stack of one or more pellets sealed in a metal cladding tube. The cladding provides structure and serves to separate the fuel from the coolant. This prevents the radioactive fission products from entering the primary coolant loop. Each pin also contains a long open space, called the gas plenum, to allow gaseous fission products to collect and for the fuel to expand. The gap between the fuel and the cladding is filled with helium. For fuel materials that swell, like metal fuel, a larger gap is necessary to allow expansion. To maintain good heat transfer, the gap is then filled with liquid sodium. Each pin is then typically wrapped with a spacer wire to prevent pins from touching each other and to minimize vibration.

Water-based reactors typically use zirconium alloys for their fuel cladding. However, zirconium absorbs too many neutrons at fast-neutron energies to be used in an SFR. Instead, the cladding materials of choice are austenitic stainless steels due to their corrosion resistance and good high-temperature mechanical strength. Ferritic steels like HT9 are also used.

Since SFRs require high fuel density, fuel assemblies typically use a 'tight' triangular or hexagonal arrangement unlike the square lattice used in LWRs. Each assembly is composed of multiple fuel pins within a hexagonal outer tube, with a spacer wire or grid plate keeping the pins apart. The lower part of the assembly contains a nozzle for sodium coolant to enter. Above each assembly is shielding and a handling socket.

=== Advantages ===
All fast reactors have several advantages over the current fleet of light-water reactors in that the waste streams are significantly reduced. When a reactor runs on fast neutrons, the plutonium isotopes are far more likely to fission upon absorbing a neutron. Thus, fast neutrons have a smaller chance of being captured by the uranium and plutonium, but when they are captured, have a much bigger chance of causing a fission. Compared to a light-water reactor, SFRs can utilize 50 times as much energy from natural uranium fuel. This results in fewer neutron captures producing transuranic waste, and the transuranic isotopes produced can be fissioned by fast neutrons. The result is that the inventory of transuranic waste is nonexistent from fast reactors. Because the transuranic waste products are responsible for the several-thousand-year lifetime of nuclear waste, destroying these isotopes in an SFR allows the waste to decay down to natural levels after only a few hundred years.

Another advantage of liquid sodium coolant is that sodium melts at 98 °C (208 °F) and boils above 892 °C (1,638 °F), while the reactor operating temperature is around 500 °C (932 °F). This results in a 400 °C (752 °F) margin until the coolant begins to boil. By comparison, the margin to boiling is only 15 °C (59 °F) in a PWR. Despite sodium's low specific heat relative to water, this enables the absorption of significant heat in the liquid phase, while maintaining large safety margins. The high thermal conductivity of sodium effectively creates a reservoir of heat capacity that provides thermal inertia against overheating. Combined with the much higher temperatures achieved in the reactor, this means that the reactor in shutdown mode can be passively cooled. This was demonstrated at EBR-II in April 1986, when the operators intentionally shut down the reactor's cooling systems with the reactor at full power, and the reactor successfully shut itself down via its inherent reactivity coefficient and maintained decay heat removal through natural circulation. A similar test was also performed at the larger Fast Flux Test Facility while at 50% power.

Sodium need not be pressurized since its boiling point is much higher than the reactor's operating temperature, and sodium does not corrode steel reactor parts, and in fact, protects metals from corrosion. The high temperatures reached by the coolant (the Phénix reactor outlet temperature was 833K (560°C)) permit a higher thermodynamic efficiency than in water cooled reactors. The fact that the sodium is not pressurized implies that a much thinner reactor vessel can be used (e.g. 2 cm thick). A small leak of sodium will also drip down before disappearing in to the atmosphere, while at the high pressures used in light-water reactors, any leaking coolant will explosively flash to steam. The use of a liquid metal also enables the use of electromagnetic pumps to circulate the coolant, which contain no moving parts.

Reactors of this type are also self-controlling, as fast-neutron reactors typically have a negative temperature coefficient of reactivity due to their small core size. If the temperature of the core increases, the core will expand slightly, which means that more neutrons will escape the core, slowing down the reaction. Furthermore, Doppler broadening at higher temperatures results in fewer neutrons available for fission, further decreasing the reaction rate.

=== Disadvantages ===
The primary disadvantage of sodium is its chemical reactivity, which requires special precautions to prevent and suppress fires. In addition, neutron capture causes it to become radioactive; albeit with a half-life of only 15 hours. The radioactivity of sodium requires the use of an intermediate sodium loop, while its chemical reactivity requires precautions such as lining the walls and floors of sodium-containing areas with stainless steel, and the use of double-wall tubes. Sodium at high temperatures ignites in contact with oxygen. Such sodium fires can be extinguished by powder, or by replacing the air with nitrogen. A Russian breeder reactor, the BN-600, reported 27 sodium leaks in a 17-year period, 14 of which led to sodium fires. If sodium comes into contact with water it reacts to produce sodium hydroxide and hydrogen, and the hydrogen can burn in contact with air.

Unlike water, sodium coolant is opaque, and thus visual inspections cannot be made under liquid sodium. Fuel handling in an SFR requires careful positioning, and the structural integrity of internal components is harder to verify. However, techniques such as ultrasonic imaging can be used to examine structures under sodium. The opacity of sodium coolant has not posed an issue to SFR operation. Maintenance on sodium-cooled reactors is also made more difficult by the need to keep the sodium molten at 200 °C (392 °F).

Unlike a light-water reactor, a fast-neutron reactor like an SFR is not in its most reactive configuration during normal operation. In the event of fuel melt, the fuel reactivity could increase. Furthermore, a large-core SFR can have a positive void coefficient in the center of its core. However, other design features can be used to produce a negative coolant temperature reactivity coefficient even in a large-sized reactor.

Fuel-cladding chemical interactions (FCCI), which can compromise the integrity of the fuel rods, also must be accommodated. In an SFR, FCCI is eutectic melting between the fuel and the cladding; uranium, plutonium, and lanthanum (a fission product) inter-diffuse with the iron of the cladding. The alloy that forms has a low melting temperature, causing the cladding to reduce in strength and even rupture. One possible solution is to have an inert matrix, using, e.g., magnesium oxide. Magnesium oxide has an order of magnitude lower probability of interacting with neutrons (thermal and fast) than elements such as iron.

== Fuel cycle ==
The SFR's fast spectrum makes it possible to use available fissile and fertile materials (including depleted uranium) considerably more efficiently than thermal spectrum reactors with once-through fuel cycles. An SFR core produces more high-energy neutrons per fission compared to a light-water reactor core, which enables both better fissile fuel utilization as well as the breeding of plutonium fuel from depleted uranium. Fast neutrons are able to fission actinides like americium and neptunium, allowing SFRs to reduce the volume and toxicity of radioactive waste.

The transuranic actinide elements (minor actinides) are responsible for the significant radiotoxicity of spent nuclear fuel after about 250 years. The destruction via transmutation of these actinides would reduce the storage time required to reduce its activity to the same level as natural uranium from over 100,000 years down to 500 if 99% of minor actinides are destroyed. Fast reactors like SFRs are considered the best tool for transmutation of minor actinides due to their high neutron flux and better neutronic properties compared with thermal reactors. However, the radioactivity and associated heat generation of minor actinides means that actinide-bearing fuel requires special handling and fabrication procedures.

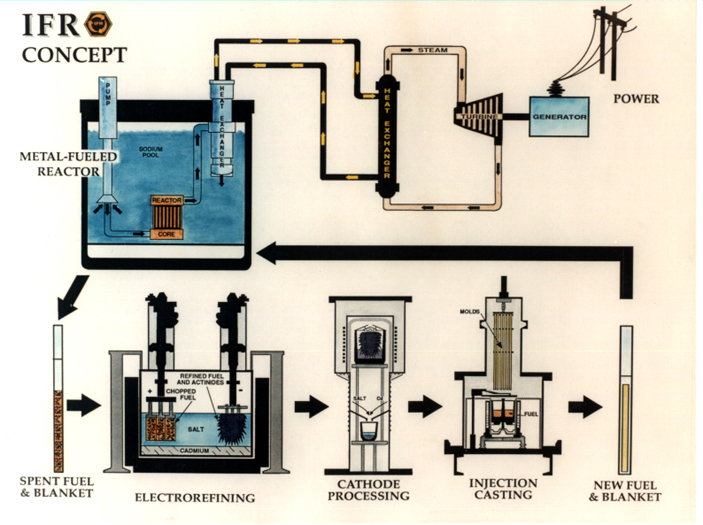
The Integral Fast Reactor, a concept combining an SFR with onsite pyrometallurgical reprocessing and fuel fabrication to achieve a closed fuel cycle

The Integral Fast Reactor (IFR) was a concept for a nuclear power plant combining an SFR with onsite reprocessing and fuel fabrication. Because of the proliferation risks of separating plutonium during reprocessing, the IFR would have used pyrometallurgical reprocessing (pyroprocessing) that separates plutonium and minor actinides together, making the plutonium unsuitable for nuclear weapons. Integrated pyroprocessing and remote metal fuel fabrication were both demonstrated successfully at EBR-II, however the IFR program was cancelled by the Clinton Administration in 1994.

Under the Generation IV initiative, the primary mission of SFR development is the management of plutonium and other actinide waste products. Work under the Gen IV initiative is focused on a closed fuel cycle, where fuel is reprocessed and recycled after leaving the reactor. With nuclear fuel recycling, SFRs are capable of producing 50 times as much energy from natural uranium as a light-water reactor. SFRs with a closed fuel cycle could therefore extend the existing nuclear fuel supply by several thousand years. The development of Gen IV SFRs has focused on a small modular (50–150 MWe) SFR using uranium-plutonium-minor-actinide-zirconium metal alloy fuel, utilizing a fuel cycle based on pyroprocessing in facilities integrated with the reactor, and a medium to large (600–1,500 MWe) loop-type SFR with mixed oxide (MOX) fuel, utilizing advanced aqueous reprocessing at a central location serving multiple reactors.

== Non-proliferation ==
Concerns over the proliferation risk of plutonium fuel are a significant obstacle to the deployment of fast reactors, including SFRs. Concerns have risen since the construction of most nuclear reactors in the 1960s and 1970s. Plutonium is particularly concerning because it can be chemically separated from spent fuel during reprocessing, unlike uranium enrichment which requires the use of difficult and expensive isotope separation techniques. The proliferation issues surrounding plutonium led the US to abandon its reprocessing program. This, in turn, led to the curtailment of fast reactor development in the US.

Abundant uranium resources and an enhanced focus on non-proliferation has slowed or shut down development of SFRs compared to light-water reactors. In France, public fear over the proliferation risks of plutonium provoked significantly greater opposition to SFRs such as Superphénix than to LWRs. However, as of 2025, no country possessing nuclear weapons has used civilian nuclear power generation to produce them. Countries such as Iran and to a certain extent South Africa chose instead to develop uranium enrichment technologies. Several experts have identified that the proliferation risks of small modular SFRs are not significantly different from those of other reactor types.

Plutonium, which is useful as a fuel in nuclear weapons, must be appropriately managed. Sodium-cooled fast reactors can destroy plutonium and can play an important role in proliferation resistance. Proliferation resistance is the ability to contain plutonium in a form with high enough radioactivity to deter separation into weapons-useable material. It is determined by both the design of a reactor and its fuel, and the method of reprocessing its spent fuel. Because of its ease of use in nuclear weapons, pure plutonium should not be recovered from spent fuel. The PUREX process, which is the most common form of reprocessing, has largely fallen out of favor for this reason. Other reprocessing technologies that do not separate plutonium from the minor actinides, such as pyroprocessing, have been under development.

In a closed fuel cycle, new fuel is fabricated from plutonium and the minor actinides, mixed with unenriched (natural) uranium. Keeping plutonium and the minor actinides combined at all times ensures that the new fuel remains highly radioactive and serves as a barrier to unauthorized handling or diversion. The widespread use of fast-neutron reactors, such as SFRs, with a closed fuel cycle would also reduce or eliminate the need for uranium enrichment. Reducing the spread of enrichment technologies would significantly strengthen the non-proliferation regime.

SFRs can be run using enriched uranium, without using plutonium. However, this largely removes the advantages of fast reactors, namely being able to burn up nuclear waste or eliminate the need for enrichment. SFRs require reprocessing to take advantage of these benefits, however reprocessing plants tend to be expensive and complex to construct. As of 2023, only a few countries such as France, Russia, and India have reprocessing plants.

== Economics ==
SFRs are capable of reducing the requirement for uranium ore by approximately 50 times compared to light-water reactors (LWRs), and can extract energy from LWR spent fuel. For countries like Japan, which imports most of its fuel, SFRs can increase energy security by significantly reducing fuel imports. Furthermore, the separation and destruction of long-lived minor actinide waste from the short-lived fission products significantly reduces the cost of constructing and maintaining nuclear waste disposal sites.

However, these fuel-cycle benefits are largely outweighed by the increased construction and operation costs linked to the use of sodium coolant. As of 2002 none of the SFRs constructed were economical to build or operate. Design studies have identified several areas for significant cost reduction to levels comparable with or cheaper than advanced LWRs. These features include reducing the number of primary loops, integration of the pump and heat exchanger, and improved materials for construction. The use of modular design and construction is expected to significantly alter the economics of SFRs.

The capital costs and economic performance of SFRs using a closed fuel cycle is difficult to ascertain due to the small number of commercial-scale SFRs and reprocessing facilities worldwide. The construction costs of SFRs are significantly higher than LWRs due to the limited construction and operating experience with these types of reactors. Furthermore, SFRs require more and unique equipment and technologies than LWRs due to their sodium coolant. Increased construction and operational experience is expected to reduce the costs of SFRs significantly, possibly achieving parity with conventional LWRs. The economic performance of reprocessing is based on the commonly-used PUREX process, while pyroprocessing could be cheaper when fully commercialized.

SFRs require reprocessing to take advantage of most of their benefits, including destruction of long-lived nuclear waste. However, reprocessing plants tend to be expensive to construct, and few countries possess commercial reprocessing as of 2026. These challenges are magnified in countries without existing nuclear energy generation. The deployment of small modular SFRs in these countries is perceived to be less likely than for other reactor types.

== List of sodium-cooled fast reactors ==
Model	Country	Thermal power (MW)	Electric power (MW)	Year of commission	Year of decommission	Notes
ASTRID	France		600	Never built		2012–2019, cancelled after €735 million spent
Aurora-INL	United States		75	Under construction		
BN-350	Soviet Union		350	1973	1999	BN-350 used to power a water desalination plant.
BN-600	Soviet Union		600	1980	Operational	Expected to operate until 2040
BN-800	Russia	2100	880	2015	Operational	
BN-1200M	Russia	2900	1220	Under construction		
CEFR	China	65	20	2012	Operational	
CFR-600	China	1500	600	2023	Operational	Two reactors being constructed on Changbiao Island in Xiapu County. The second CFR-600 reactor will open in 2026.
CFR-1000	China		1200	After 2030 (est.)		Awaiting approval for construction
CRBRP	United States	1000	350	Never built		1970-1983, cancelled after $8 billion spent
DFR	United Kingdom	60	14	1962	1977	
EBR-1	United States	1.4	0.2	1950	1964	
EBR-2	United States	62.5	20	1965	1994	
Fast Flux Test Facility	United States	400		1978	1993	Not for power generation
FBTR	India	40	13.2	1985	Operational	
Fermi 1	United States	200	69	1963	1975	
Jōyō	Japan	150		1971	Under repair	Expected to be restarted at the end of 2026
Kemmerer 1	United States	840	345	Under construction		Incorporates a thermal energy storage system that can temporarily supply up to 500 MW_{e}
Monju	Japan	714	280	1995/2010	2010	Suspended for 15 years. Reactivated in 2010, then permanently closed
PFBR	India		500	2026		Criticality achieved, awaiting connection to grid
PFR	United Kingdom	500	250	1974	1994	
Phénix	France	590	250	1973	2010	
Rapsodie	France	40	24	1967	1983	
SEFOR	United States	20		1969	1972	
SNR-300	Germany		327	1985	1991	Never critical/operational
Superphénix	France	3000	1242	1986	1997	Largest SFR ever built.

== See also ==
- Gas-cooled fast reactor
- Lead-cooled fast reactor
- Nuclear power as renewable energy
