= CFR-600 =

Nuclear reactor in Fujian province, China

China Fast Reactor 600 (CFR-600)
- Generation: Generation IV
- Reactor concept: Fast breeder reactor
- Status: Under construction
- Location: Xiapu County, Fujian province, China
- Coordinates: 26°48′13″N 120°09′18″E

Main parameters of the reactor core
- Fuel (fissile material): UO_{2} (initial stage); MOX (later stage)
- Neutron energy spectrum: Fast
- Primary coolant: Liquid sodium

Reactor usage
- Power (thermal): 1500 MW_{th}
- Power (electric): 600 MW_{e} gross

The CFR-600 (Xiapu fast reactor pilot project) is a sodium-cooled pool-type fast-neutron nuclear reactor in Xiapu County, Fujian province, China, on Changbiao Island. It is a generation IV demonstration project by the China National Nuclear Corporation (CNNC). Construction started in late 2017. These first reactor started operations in 2023 The reactor will have an output of 1500 MW thermal power and 600 MW electric power. The fuel will be supplied by TVEL, subsidiary of Rosatom, according to the agreement signed in 2019.

The CFR-600 is part of the Chinese plan to reach a closed nuclear fuel cycle. Fast neutron reactors are the main future nuclear power technology in China.

A larger commercial-scale reactor, the CFR-1000, is also planned.

On the same site, the building of a second 600 MW fast reactor CFR-600 was started in December 2020 and four 1000 MW CAP1000 are proposed.

Such breeder reactors have the possibility to be used to produce weapons grade plutonium for nuclear weapon manufacturing purposes.

== Reactors ==
Unit	Type	Model	Net capacity	Gross capacity	Thermal capacity	Construction Start	Operation Start	Notes
Xiapu-1	FBR	CFR-600	642 MWe	682 MWe	1882 MWt	2017-12-29		
Xiapu-2	FBR	CFR-600	642 MWe	682 MWe	1882 MWt	2020-12-27		
Phase II
Xiapu-3	PWR	Hualong One	1000 MW	1215 MW	3400 MW			
Xiapu-4	PWR	Hualong One	1000 MW	1215 MW	3400 MW			

== Controversy ==
Al Jazeera reported in 2021 that the reactors are controversial because they produce weapons-grade plutonium, offering a dual military and civilian use. China has stopped annual voluntary declarations to the International Atomic Energy Agency [IAEA] on its stocks of plutonium.

== See also ==
- Nuclear power in China
- China Experimental Fast Reactor (CEFR)
- BN-600 reactor
- BN-1200 reactor
- Integral fast reactor
- List of nuclear reactors#China
