= Wunderland Kalkar =

Amusement park in Kalkar, Germany

Coordinates: 51°45′51″N 6°19′34″E

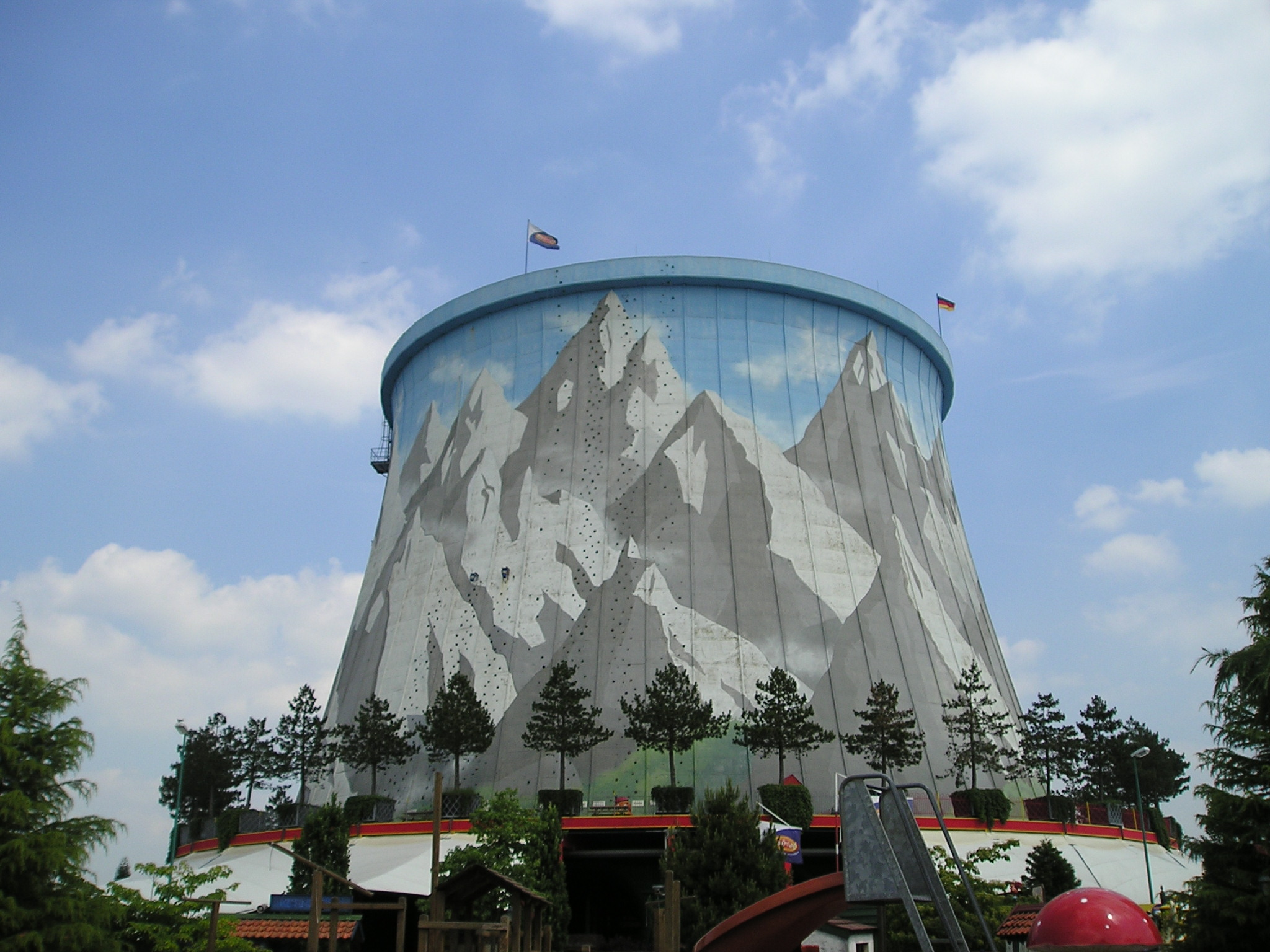
The climbing wall, up the side of the former cooling tower at Wunderland Kalkar.

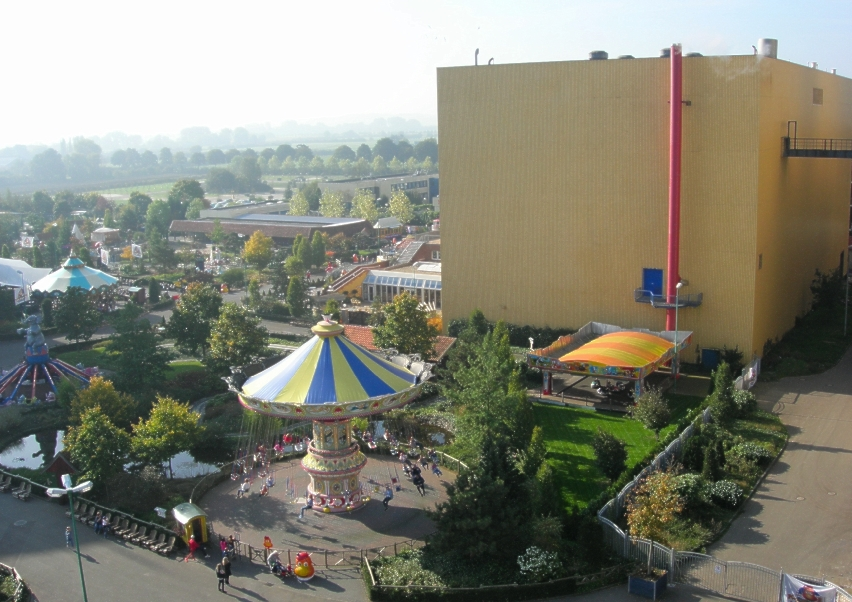
Carousel

Wunderland Kalkar is an amusement park in Kalkar, North Rhine-Westphalia, Germany. It is built on the former site of SNR-300, a nuclear power plant that never went online because of construction problems and protests. The park was constructed by Dutch entrepreneur Hennie van der Most, who purchased the site for a rumored price of US$3 million. Wunderland Kalkar receives around 600,000 visitors each year.

Many of the facilities constructed for the plant have been integrated into the park and its attractions, including the cooling tower, which features a swing ride and a climbing wall. The park also features four restaurants, eight bars, and six hotels.
