= Aurora nuclear reactor =

Proposed fuel-recycling commercial reactor

Aurora Powerhouse
- Generation: IV
- Reactor concept: Sodium-cooled fast reactor
- Status: Under construction
- Location: Idaho National Laboratory
- Coordinates: 43°33′11.63″N 112°39′24.8″W

Main parameters of the reactor core
- Fuel (fissile material): HALEU metallic fuel
- Fuel state: Solid
- Neutron energy spectrum: Fast
- Primary coolant: Liquid sodium

Reactor usage
- Primary use: Electricity and fuel recycling
- Power (electric): 75 MW_{e}
- Operator/owner: Oklo Inc.

The Aurora Powerhouse is a small modular reactor design developed by Oklo Inc. It is a 75 MW pool-type sodium-cooled fast reactor. Its first commercial unit is under construction at Idaho National Laboratory under the auspices of the United States Department of Energy's Reactor Pilot Program.

== First proposal ==
The first proposed reactor to use the Aurora Powerhouse name was a fast-neutron microreactor with heat pipe cooling similar to the NASA Kilopower reactor. It was to provide 1.4 MW_{e} and operate at extremely low burnup, allowing it to operate for its entire 20 year lifetime without refueling. It was to use heat pipe cooling and a supercritical carbon dioxide power conversion system. According to Oklo, the reactor would have had a "large negative temperature reactivity coefficient", lack pumps and valves, use heat pipes for heat removal, have no nuclear refueling intervals and associated core exposure, and have its core buried underground. In presenting its safety design to the Nuclear Regulatory Commission, Oklo quoted a study of the EBR-II, which is a different reactor technology, as being "inherently protected without requiring emergency power, safety systems, or operator intervention".

The reactor would have been fueled by recycled high-assay, low-enriched uranium (HALEU) fuel originally fabricated for EBR-II, and if completed, would have become "the first fuel-recycling commercial reactor in the United States". The DOE's Idaho National Laboratory (INL) said it would provide 10 tons of HALEU for the test reactor which corresponded to most of the available supply. Reprocessing would have occurred at INL's Materials and Fuels Complex (MFC) and possibly also the Idaho Nuclear Technology and Engineering Center (INTEC), neither of which were operational facilities as of early 2020. Oklo received a site use permit from the Department of Energy in 2019, and submitted its application for a combined license to the United States Nuclear Regulatory Commission (NRC) in 2020.

On January 6, 2022, the NRC denied Oklo's combined license application due to lack of information regarding several key topics for the Aurora reactor.

== Second proposal ==
The second reactor to use the Aurora Powerhouse name is a different design based on the Experimental Breeder Reactor II (EBR-II). This design is a pool-type sodium-cooled fast reactor, producing a power output of 75 MW_{e}. The reactor vessel will be situated below ground. The first commercial unit, Aurora-INL, will use the same site use permit as the original proposal and broke ground on September 22, 2025. As a part of the Reactor Pilot Program, the Aurora-INL is to be licensed under the DOE rather than the NRC.

It will use the same metallic HALEU fuel originally fabricated for EBR-II. This fuel is planned to be fabricated at Oklo's Aurora Fuel Fabrication Facility, which is under construction at INL as of 2026.

In June 2026, Oklo and Siemens Energy confirmed that the steam turbine and generator for Aurora-INL were in active production, and were on track for reactor startup in 2028. The facility's Preliminary Documented Safety Analysis, the third of four authorizations required for operation, was approved on June 11, 2026.

== See also ==
- List of small modular reactor designs
- Nuclear renaissance in the United States
- Nuclear reprocessing
