= Centraco =

Centre nucléaire de traitement et de conditionnement

Coordinates: 44.1365°N 4.7070°E

Centraco ("Centre nucléaire de traitement et de conditionnement", a French "nuclear installation for the treatment and conditioning" of radioactive waste), is a factory operated by the society for packaging radioactive waste and industrial effluents (fr:Cyclife France, formerly fr:SOCODEI). Located on the Marcoule nuclear site in an area of 11 hectares in the Codolet commune (Gard), this nuclear facility is operational since 1999.

== Types of radioactive waste ==
Nuclear waste treated by Centraco are very low, low and intermediate activity (TFA, FMA). They come from the nuclear industry (mainly from EDF and Areva), research centers (Atomic Energy Commission, CEA), and small producers such as hospitals and universities.

Types of waste treated in the plant:

- Metallic objects from maintenance operations in controlled area and the dismantling of nuclear power plants;
- Burnable (i.e., incinerable) waste, mainly gloves and overalls;
- Liquid waste such as cleaning solutions, oils, solvents, resins, and sludges from nuclear installations.

== Waste treatment ==
The main goal is to minimize the waste volume before it is conditioned and packaged. The Centraco plant consists of two main units dealing with waste by type:

- The melting of metals
- The incineration plant for burnable waste and liquid effluents.

Residues from each unit are mixed with a conditioning matrix and then packaged. The final volume of waste is reduced by a factor of 10.

=== The incineration plant ===
The furnace of the incineration plant consists of three chambers:

- A primary chamber with a temperature of 900 – 1000 °C
- A secondary chamber with a temperature of 1100 – 1200 °C
- A tertiary chamber.

Solid waste is fed into the primary chamber. Liquid waste is injected either in the primary chamber, or in the secondary chamber according to their chemical composition and thermal power output.

The ashes and slags are collected and immobilized within a cementitious matrix. They are then packed in metal drums and shipped to the National Agency for Radioactive Waste (ANDRA).

The incinerator has a rated capacity of 5000 tons of waste / year.

An explosion on September 12, 2011, caused the death of an employee, and injured four others. This happened in a furnace at the site of reprocessing nuclear waste at Marcoule. It was an "industrial accident" and not "nuclear accident".

=== The furnace ===
The smelter includes an induction furnace for the manufacture of ingots and metal ferrules. The metals are melted in the furnace at 1600 °C. Impurities are removed manually, then the molten metal is poured into a ladle and is then cast into ingots, or centrifuged to form a tube.

The ingots, cylinders of about 1.5 ton, are considered as final waste products of low and intermediate activity and then sent to the Storage Center of Aube (Centre de Stockage de l'Aube, CSA) in Soulaines-Dhuys for long-term storage (300 years) on surface.

The steel tubes are recycled for manufacturing gamma radiation shields for medium-level waste (MLW) such as inner shells, or internal shielding, for γ-irradiating drums, allowing so the reuse of part of the metallic waste.
