= Astrit =

- Gender: Male

Origin
- Region of origin: Albania, Kosovo

Astrit is an Albanian masculine given name and may refer to:

- Astrit Ajdarević (born 1990), Albanian footballer
- Astrit Bushati (born 1962), Albanian footballer
- Astrit Fazliu (born 1987), Kosovar-Albanian footballer
- Astrit Hafizi (born 1953), Albanian footballer and coach
- Astrit Haraqija (born 1972), Kosovan politician
- Astrit Patozi (born 1964), Albanian politician
- Astrit Selmani (born 1997), Kosovan footballer
- Astrit Ziu (born 1946), Albanian footballer

== See also ==
- Astrid
