= Oklo Inc. =

American nuclear technology company

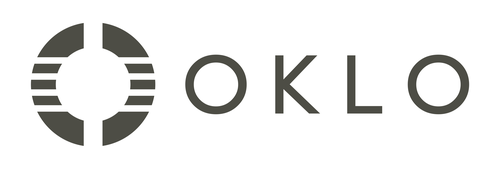
- Type: Public
- Traded as: NYSE: OKLO
- Industry: Nuclear power
- Founded: 2013; 13 years ago
- Founders: Jacob DeWitte; Caroline DeWitte
- Headquarters: Santa Clara, California, U.S.
- Products: Nuclear reactors; Radioisotopes
- Number of employees: Over 200 (2026)
- Subsidiaries: Atomic Alchemy
- Website: oklo.com

Oklo Inc. is a publicly traded American nuclear power company based in Santa Clara, California. The company develops a small modular nuclear reactor, the Aurora Powerhouse, and intends to sell both electricity and radioisotopes produced by their Aurora reactors. The company's name is derived from Oklo, a region in the country of Gabon, Africa, where self-sustaining nuclear fission reactions occurred approximately 1.7 billion years ago.

Founded in 2013 by Jacob and Caroline DeWitte, Oklo Inc. focuses on fast-fission power plants. OpenAI co-founder Sam Altman served as Chairman of the Board of Directors, but stepped down in April 2025 to "avoid a conflict of interest ahead of talks between his company and the nuclear start-up on an energy supply agreement."

== Aurora Powerhouse ==
The Aurora Powerhouse is a 75 MW_{e} small modular reactor designed by Oklo. It is a compact sodium-cooled fast reactor, modeled after Experimental Breeder Reactor II (EBR-II), and uses metallic HALEU fuel. The Aurora Powerhouse is intended for off-grid applications, including data centers, remote communities, industrial sites, and military bases. Oklo's business model is aimed at developing, building, and operating nuclear power plants to sell power to customers, with the Aurora Powerhouse being its flagship product.

Around 20 fast reactors have been tested since the 1950s. As a liquid metal-cooled fast reactor, the Aurora Powerhouse will offer several advantages over light-water reactors regarding its operation and safety. The Aurora reactor features strongly negative reactivity feedback coefficients that arise from the system's physics. These inherent feedback mechanisms will reduce reactor power in response to temperature excursions without requiring any operator intervention or active safety systems. This was demonstrated in the Shutdown Heat Removal Test series at the EBR-II, a sodium fast reactor operated between 1964 and 1994 that inspired much of the design of the Aurora powerhouse.

The Aurora Powerhouse was initially designed as a 1.5 MW_{e} heat pipe-cooled microreactor. Oklo's application for a combined construction and operating license for this version of the Aurora powerhouse was initially denied by the Nuclear Regulatory Commission (NRC) on January 6, 2022. The NRC cited a lack of information provided by Oklo during the application process and that Oklo could re-submit in the future. Oklo has remained engaged with the NRC since that decision through pre-application activities and readiness work intended to support a future combined license application. In 2025, Oklo reported completing the NRC's pre-application readiness assessment for Phase 1 of its Aurora combined license process. Oklo began pre-construction of its first Aurora powerhouse at Idaho National Laboratory in 2025 and aims to begin commercial operations of the plant by 2028. Oklo has an around 15 GW order book through an agreements with Meta and a Master Power Agreement with Switch and has signed letters of intent with Diamondback Energy and Wyoming Hyperscale to provide electricity for Diamondback's Permian Basin operations and Wyoming Hyperscale's data center campus over 20-year periods.

In May 2025, Oklo was among several advanced nuclear developers picked for DOE's Reactor Pilot Program as part of a federal initiative to power AI data centers with nuclear energy through fast-track deployment at U.S. Department of Energy sites, including Idaho National Laboratory. A number of SMR construction site projects have received NRC approval, including several for Oklo Inc. Oklo is currently working under Department of Energy oversight in INL as part of the Reactor Pilot Program and will demonstrate viability under DOE before working with the NRC to take the Aurora-INL to commercial operations, expected in 2028.

Since 2023, design documents, including the Principal Design Criteria for the Aurora Powerhouse (ML25220A124), have been accepted for review and remain under active evaluation. Oklo has signed a DOE Other Transaction Agreement and the DOE Idaho Operations Office has approved the Nuclear Safety Design Agreement (NSDA) for Oklo's fast-fission power plant at INL. In 2026, Oklo has stated it expects Aurora-INL to start operations in 2028.

== Fuel recycling ==
Oklo intends to recycle the spent nuclear fuel produced by its Aurora reactors. In 2025, it announced that it would build a first-of-its-kind fuel recycling facility in Oak Ridge, Tennessee. On 26 May, 2026, Oklo was selected by the Department of Energy (DoE) for advanced talks to join the Surplus Plutonium Utilization Program. The program converts designated surplus plutonium material into fuel for advanced reactors, and Oklo is pairing it with a partnership with European developer newcleo that could bring up to $2 billion in project capital, subject to definitive agreements.

== Atomic Alchemy ==
Oklo also intends to produce radioisotopes through its nuclear fuel recycling process. These radioisotopes have a wide range of applications, including medical diagnostic imaging and cancer treatment; industrial uses like non-destructive testing and process control; and energy applications including radioisotope thermoelectric generators, nuclear batteries and fusion research. In May 2024, the company announced a partnership with Idaho-based radioisotopes company Atomic Alchemy. Later in 2024, Oklo announced it would acquire Atomic Alchemy, and completed the purchase in March 2025.

On September 12, 2025, Atomic Alchemy submitted an application to construct a radioisotope production facility to the NRC. The facility, Meitner-1, would house four isotope production reactors and be located at Idaho National Laboratory. However, in December 2025, the company withdrew its construction permit application, following Atomic Alchemy's selection by the Department of Energy's Reactor Pilot Program.

As part of the program, Oklo is constructing a pool-type isotope production reactor, the Groves Isotope Test Reactor, near Lockhart, Texas. Groves is a pilot-scale project built as a test platform for future production-scale reactors. The Groves reactor achieved criticality on August 5th, 2026, having been constructed within less than a year.

== Funding and investment ==
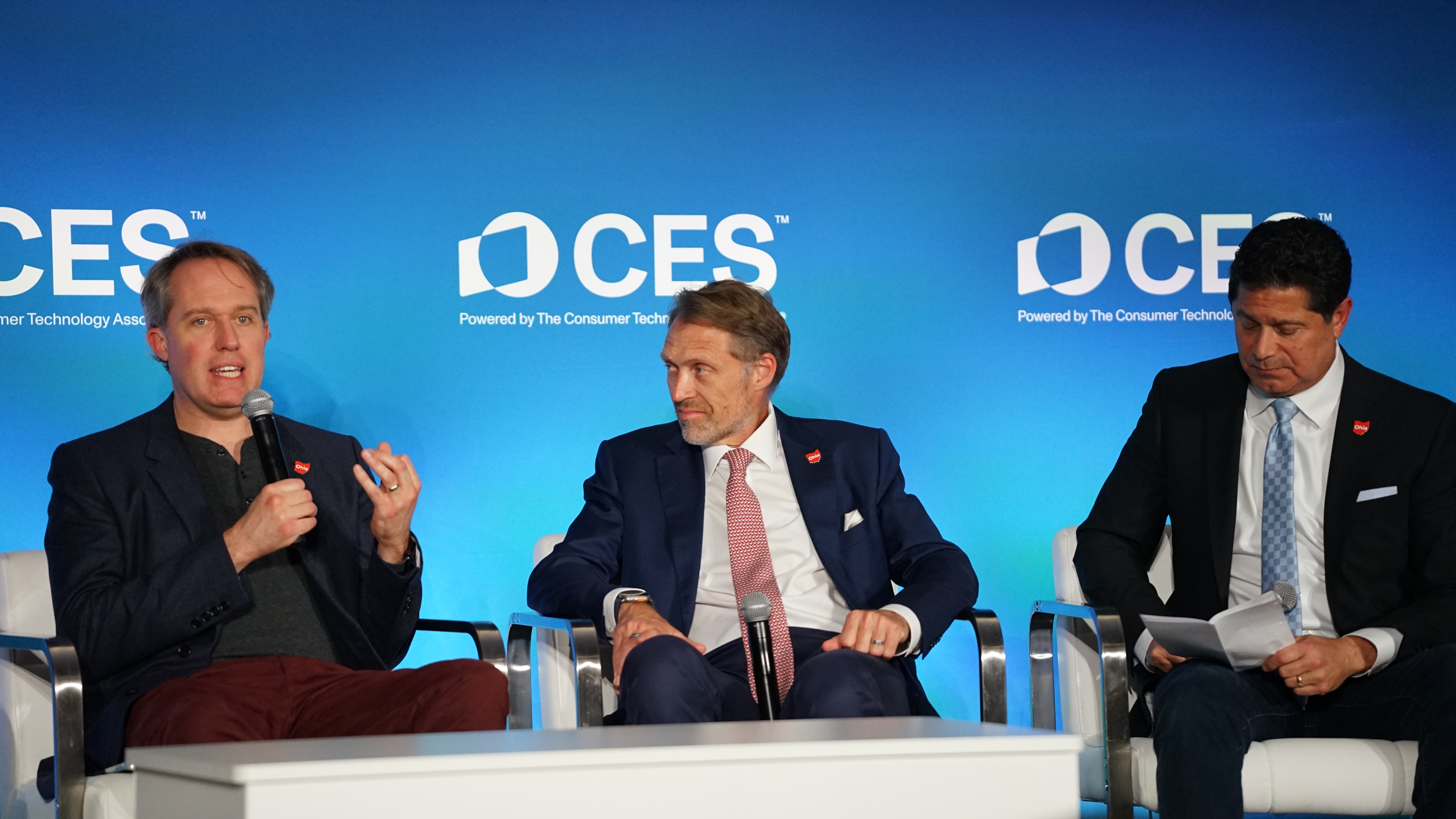
Jacob DeWitte, JoeBen Bevirt, J.P. Nauseef at CES 2026

The company has received venture capital from various investors, including Hydrazine Capital, founded by Sam Altman with Peter Thiel as its sole limited partner; Facebook co-founder Dustin Moskovitz; Ron Conway of SV Angel; Kevin Efrusy of Accel Partners; and Tim Draper of Draper Associates. In July 2023, it was announced that the company planned to go public via a special purpose acquisition company (SPAC) at a value of $850 million. On May 10, 2024, Oklo merged with AltC Acquisition Corp, a SPAC founded and led by Sam Altman, receiving $306 millions in gross proceeds.
