= China Experimental Fast Reactor =

Nuclear reactor in China

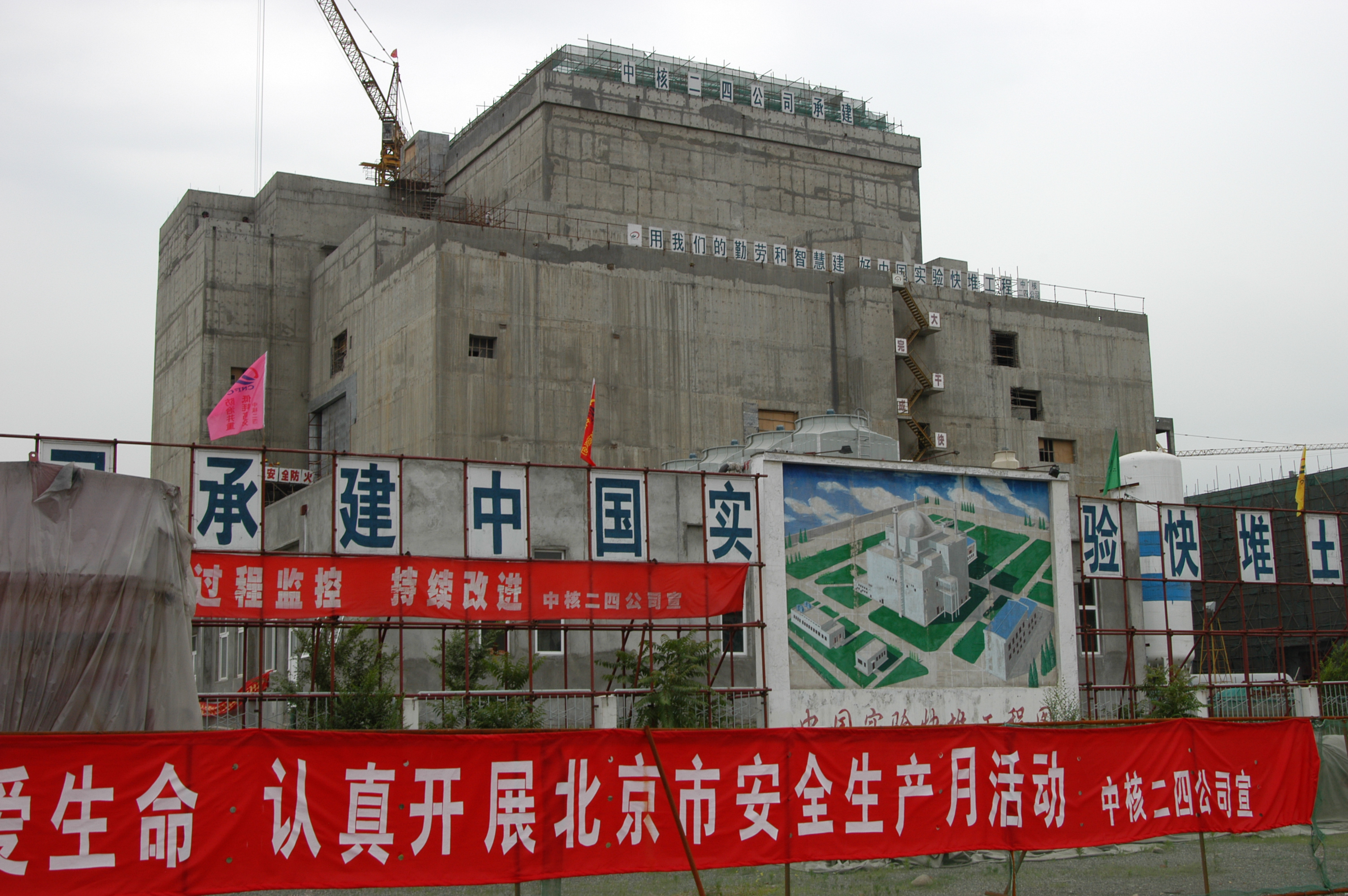
- CEFR under construction on June 4, 2004
- Official name: 中国实验快堆
- Country: People's Republic of China
- Coordinates: 39°44′27″N 116°01′49″E
- Status: Operational
- Commission date: October 31, 2012.
- Owner: China Institute of Atomic Energy

Nuclear power station
- Reactor type: Fast-neutron reactor
- Cooling source: Sodium

Power generation
- Units operational: 65 MW (thermal), 20 MW (electric)
- Nameplate capacity: 20 MW

The China Experimental Fast Reactor (CEFR) is China's first fast nuclear reactor, and is located outside Beijing at the China Institute of Atomic Energy. It aims to provide China with fast-reactor design, construction, and operational experience, and will be a key facility for testing and researching components and materials to be used in subsequent fast reactors. The reactor achieved first criticality on July 21, 2010 and started generating power a year later on July 21, 2011. In October 2012 Xinhua announced that the CEFR has passed official checks. The CEFR was brought to full power at 5.00pm on 15 December 2014 and operated at this level continuously for three full days.

CEFR is a 65 MW thermal, 20 MW electric, sodium-cooled, pool-type reactor with a 30-year design lifetime and a target burnup of 100 MWd/kg. The CEFR was built by Russia's OKBM Afrikantov in collaboration with OKB Gidropress, NIKIET and Kurchatov Institute.

The CEFR project was approved by the Chinese State Council in 1992, with final approval given in 1995. The China Experimental Fast Reactor is one of the major energy projects under 863 Program, the national high-tech research and development program. The China Institute of Atomic Energy (CIAE) is the organizer of the project's construction.

Japan's Atomic Energy Agency (JAEA) reported that the reactor stopped generating electricity in October 2011 following an accident; however, the director of the China Institute of Atomic Energy (CIAE) denied that any accident had occurred.

== See also ==
- Nuclear power in China
- CFR-600
