= Astrid Brousselle =

Canadian academic in healthcare economics

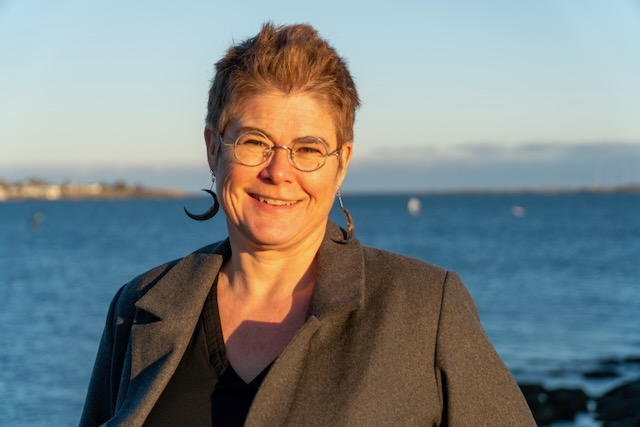

Academic background
- Education: University of Montreal

Academic work
- Discipline: Healthcare evaluation theories, healthcare methods, healthcare system analysis
- Institutions: McGill University; University of Sherbrooke; University of Victoria

Astrid Brousselle is a Canadian professor specializing in evaluation theories and methods in health and healthcare system analysis. Since 2017, she has been at the University of Victoria as a director and professor, in the School of Public Administration.

== Early life and education ==
Astrid Brousselle obtained a B.Sc. in economics, a M.Sc. in health administration, and a Ph.D. in public health (2002) from the University of Montreal with a specialization in evaluation theories and methods.

== Career ==
After obtaining her PhD, she completed a postdoc at McGill University, continuing to study evaluation theory. After this, she was appointed to an Assistant Professor position within the Department of Health Administration at the University of Montreal. She held a Canada Research Chair in Evaluation and Health Care System Improvement at University of Sherbrooke from 2011 to 2016. She also served as the vice-director of research for the Community Health Sciences Department and co-director of the Health: Population, Organizations, and Practices research group while at the University of Sherbrooke. Prior to joining the University of Victoria School of Public Administration in 2017, she spent the 2013-2014 academic term within the Faculty of Human and Social Development at that institution.

Astrid Brousselle has published more than 90 scientific articles and in 2009 published a book in French titled L’Évaluation: Concepts et Méthodes, for which she has won two prizes. Her current research focuses on planetary health. She developed diverse approaches and tools for contributing to planetary health and, in 2026, she published a book Foundations of Evaluation for Planetary Health (Open Access, University of Victoria Libraries). She also often communicates with the general public and health care practitioners through interviews and op-eds, covering topics such as healthcare budgets, medicare in Quebec, public health, and climate action in British Columbia.
