= Phénix =

French nuclear power plant

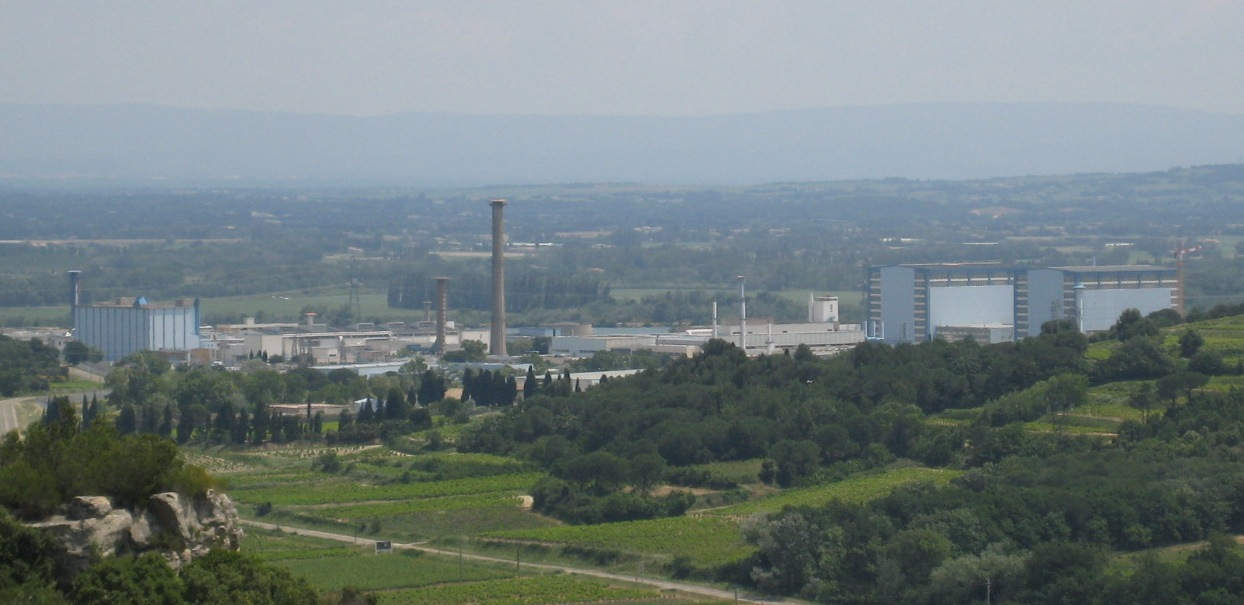
- Official name: Phénix
- Country: France
- Location: Marcoule
- Coordinates: 44°08′36″N 4°42′42″E
- Status: Closed
- Construction began: 1968
- Commission date: 13 December 1973
- Decommission date: 1 February 2010
- Operators: CEA; EDF

Nuclear power station
- Reactor type: FBR
- Reactor supplier: CEM
- Cooling source: Sodium

Power generation
- Make and model: CEM
- Units decommissioned: 1 x 250 MW
- Nameplate capacity: 250 MW
- Capacity factor: 27.0%
- Annual net output: 591 GW·h

Phénix (French for phoenix) was a small-scale (gross 264/net 233 MW_{e}) prototype fast breeder reactor, located at the Marcoule nuclear site, near Orange, France. It was a pool-type liquid-metal fast breeder reactor cooled with liquid sodium. It generated 590 MW of thermal power, and had a breeding ratio of 1.16 (16% more plutonium produced than consumed), but normally had to be stopped for refueling operations every two months. Phénix continued operating after the closure of the subsequent full-scale prototype Superphénix in 1997. After 2004, its main use was investigation of transmutation of nuclear waste while also generating some electricity. Phénix was shut down in 2009.

The decommissioning project started in 2005. Between 2009 and 2011, the non-nuclear equipment and turbine hall were dismantled. The decommissioning license was expected for 2015. Finalising of the decommissioning process is expected between 2031 and 2043.

== History ==
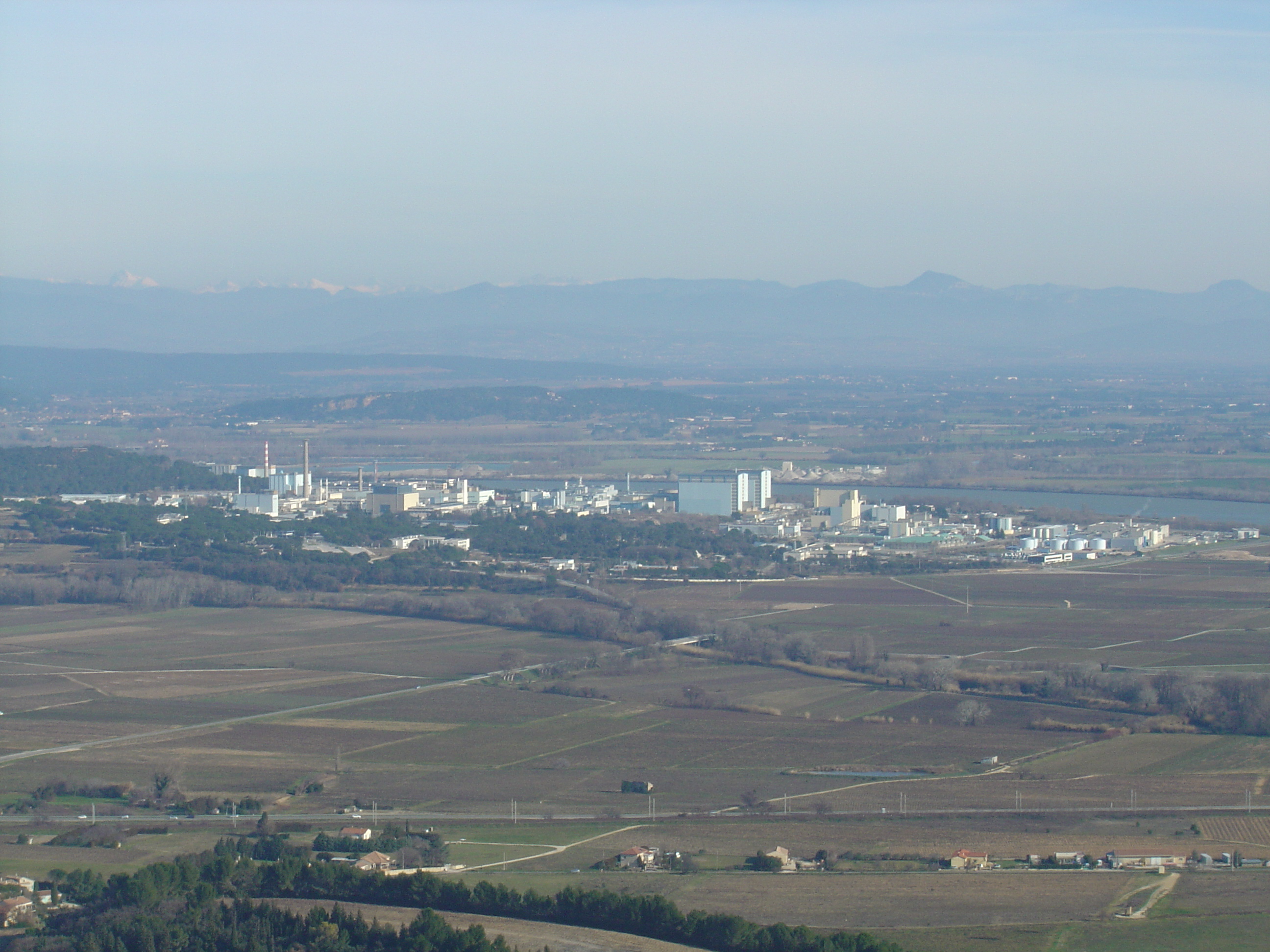
The Marcoule site, with the Phénix reactor on the very left side (red-white chimney) (2013)

Construction of Phénix began in November 1968. The first connection to the French national electricity grid was in December 1973.

Plans for a French fast reactor date as far back as 1958's Rapsodie, and followed up in 1964 for a larger design with a power output of 1 GWe. Construction of the Rapsodie facility started in 1962 and went critical on 28 January 1967. It did not have power producing systems, but its 22 MW of thermal output (MWth) would translate to perhaps 9 MW of electrical output (MWe). Experiments on core configurations were carried out in the Masurca facility starting in 1966, and design of a larger power-producing facility was already well underway.

During the 1960s, interest in nuclear power was reaching a crescendo. For France, with little uranium supply of their own, large scale generation would be subject to supply constraints, especially given that nuclear power was experiencing a boom in construction that suggested the available supply would be limited even on a worldwide basis. In France's plans, breeders would serve the twin purposes of producing fuel for their conventional light water reactor fleet, as well as producing that fuel from the waste fuel from those reactors, thereby reducing the amount of nuclear waste they would have to dispose of. Only a small number of breeders, estimated to be around 20, would be required to fuel the fleet of about 200 light water reactors.

France began construction of the Phénix demonstration plant in November 1968, only a year after Rapsodie went critical. It was fueled with 931 kg of highly enriched plutonium, around 77% Pu-239. The fuel load is capable of running for about 90 days maximum, but in practice it normally ran for two month periods. Due to its design, refueling required the reactor to be shut down. As a result, it had a low capacity factor (CF), on the order of 65%. As a prototype plant, a high CF was not a design goal, although any practical design would have to improve this. Phénix demonstrated a breeding ratio of 1.16, meaning it produced 16% more fuel than it consumed, while also producing 233 MWe in normal operation.

Phénix ran without problems through the 1970s and '80s, but in the early 1990s it began to demonstrate a number of unexplained behaviours, including large power transients. This had serious safety implications, and the reactor was repeatedly shut down, spending most of the period from 1991 to 1994 being studied while offline. The long offline period required it to be recertified, so the plant also underwent a significant refurbishment between 1994 and 2002. It was finally recertified in June 2003, but only at a reduced power of 130 MWe.
