= Astrid Beckmann =

German mathematician and physicist (born 1957)

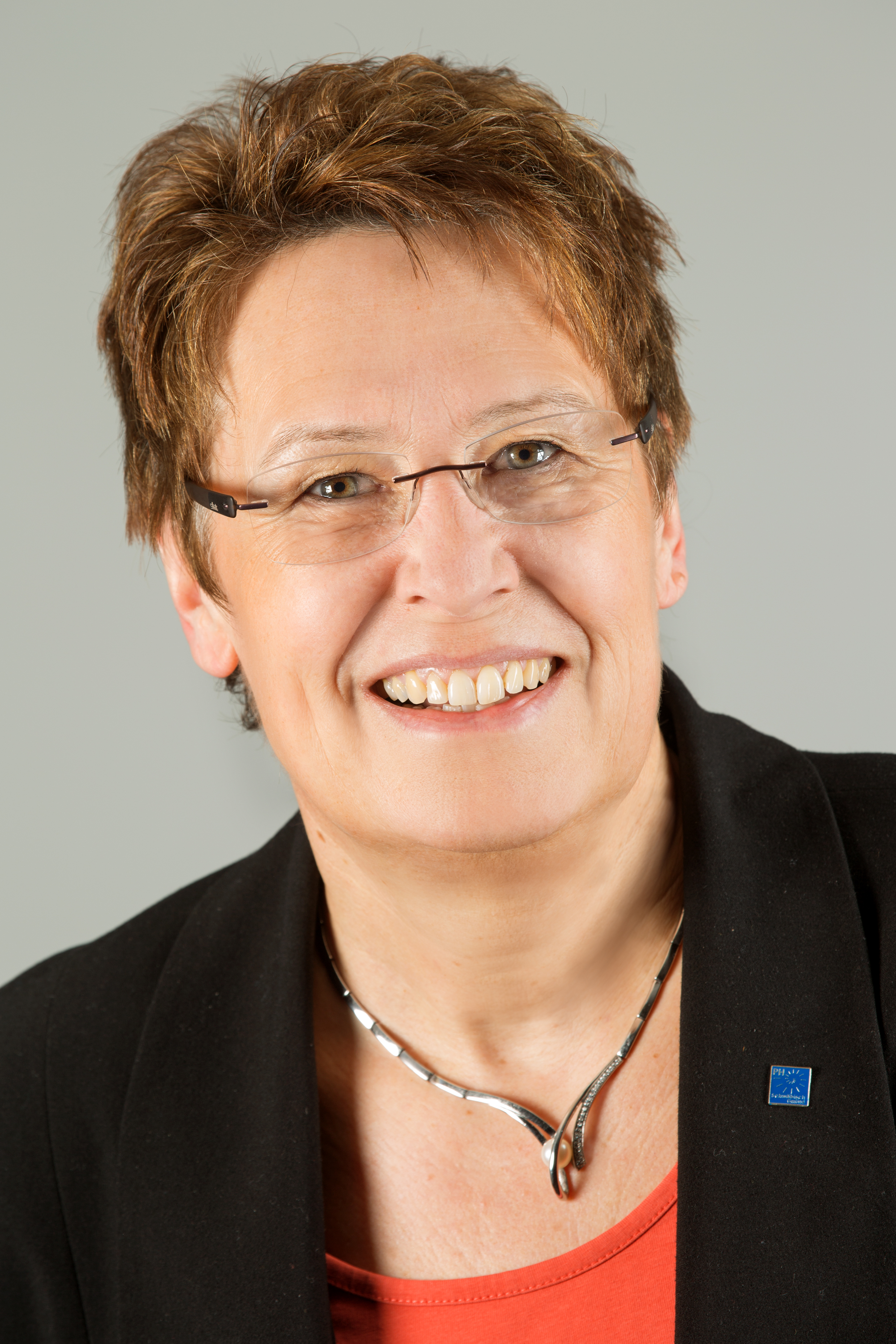
- Beckmann in 2015
- Born: Astrid Rautenberg; 20 December 1957 (age 68); Berlin, West Germany

Academic background
- Education: Free University of Berlin; University of Giessen

Academic work
- Discipline: Mathematician
- Sub-discipline: Mathematics education
- Institutions: Pädagogische Hochschule Schwäbisch Gmünd

Astrid Beckmann (née Rautenberg, born 20 December 1957) is a German physicist, a professor of mathematics and mathematics education, and was a long-serving university president. Beckmann served as president of the Pädagogische Hochschule Schwäbisch Gmünd from 2010 to 2018. She also taught at the University of Ulm.

== Life and career ==
Beckmann was born in Berlin. While at school, she recorded one first-place finish and one second-place finish in the national German math competition Bundeswettbewerb Mathematik. Upon finishing her school studies in 1976, she read mathematics and physics at the Free University of Berlin. Beckmann then wrote her physics thesis, which dealt with resistance measurements on metallic compounds, at the Helmholtz Center for Materials and Energy (HZB). Having successfully completed her teacher training in Darmstadt, she took up a position as a physicist in the Institute of Physics at Goethe University Frankfurt. During her time in Frankfurt's "crystal lab". Beckmann tackled issues relating to materials research with a focus on rare earth compounds.

In 1989, Beckmann obtained a doctorate in mathematics at the University of Giessen with a thesis on teaching geometry proofs to 12- to 15-year-old students (supervised by Heinz Schwartze and Günter Pickert). She then continued her work in the field of mathematics education, initially with the help of a scholarship from the Hessen State Ministry for Higher Education, Research and the Arts. From 1994 to 2003, she taught mathematics and physics in Lemgo and at Leibniz University Hanover. She completed her postdoctorate at this latter institution in 2003 in mathematics education. Beckmann's thesis addressed the development of a model concept for interdisciplinary teaching, with a focus on mathematics in connection to physics, language and computer science.

Following a brief period as an associate professor at Leibniz University Hannover, Beckmann was appointed Professor of Mathematics and Mathematics Education at the University of Education Schwäbisch Gmünd in 2003. She headed the Institute of Mathematics and Computer Science from 2003 to 2005 and was vice-president for Research, Development, and International Relations between 2005 and 2008.

Beckmann was unanimously elected president of the University of Education Schwäbisch Gmünd in 2009 and occupied this post from 2010 to 2018. Beckmann was deputy chair of the State Rectors' Conference for Universities of Education (LRK) from 2011 to 2015, subsequently taking over as chair between April 2015 and 2017. As a member of the LRK board, she also represented the Universities of Education in the Senate of the German Rectors' Conference (HRK).
