= Astrud =

Astrud may refer to:

- Astrud (band), Spanish pop-rock group
- "Astrud", song on Time and Tide by Basia
- Astrud Gilberto (1940–2023), Brazilian samba and bossa nova singer
- Astrud Aurelia, American drag performer
