= Marcoule Nuclear Site =

Nuclear facility in France

Marcoule Nuclear Power Plant
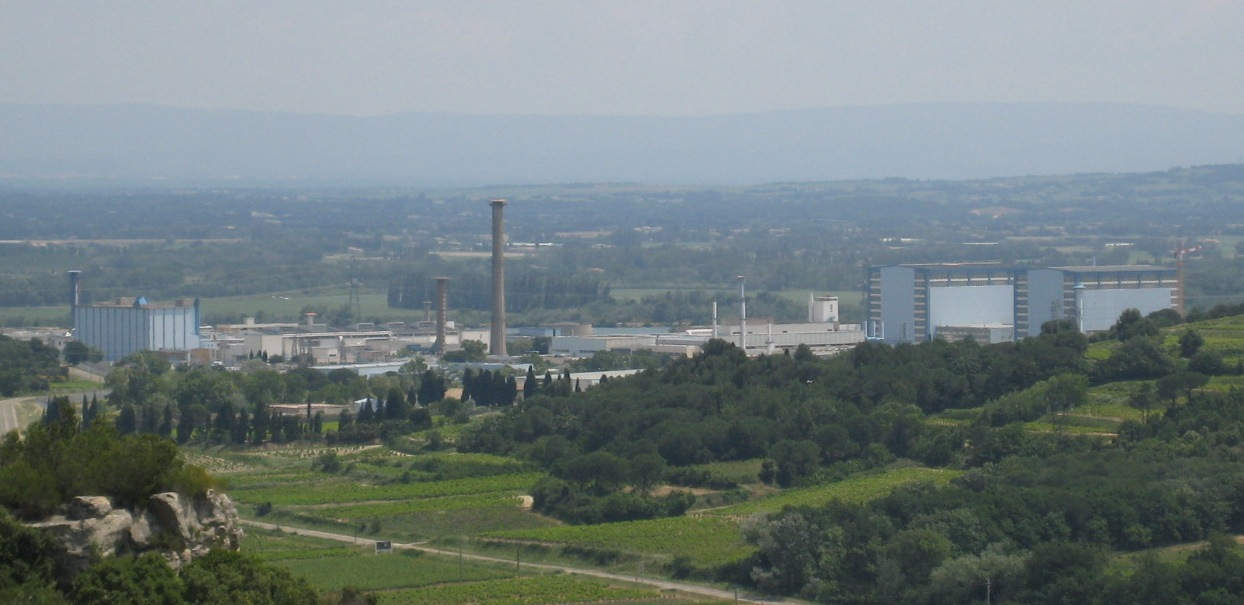
- Country: France
- Location: Chusclan and Codolet communes
- Coordinates: 44°8′36″N 4°42′34″E
- Status: Decommissioned
- Construction began: 1952
- Commission date: 7 January 1956; 70 years ago
- Decommission date: 20 June 1984; 42 years ago
- Operator: EDF/CEA

Nuclear power station
- Reactor supplier: SACM

Power generation
- Make and model: Rateau
- Units decommissioned: 1 x 2 MW; 2 x 38 MW

External links
- Commons: Related media on Commons

Marcoule Nuclear Site (French: Site nucléaire de Marcoule) is a nuclear facility in the Chusclan and Codolet communes, near Bagnols-sur-Cèze in the Gard department of France, which is in the tourist, wine and agricultural Côtes-du-Rhône region. The plant is around 25 km north west of Avignon, on the banks of the Rhone.

Operational since 1956, Marcoule is a gigantic site run by the atomic energy organization Commissariat à l'Énergie Atomique (CEA) and Areva NC and is known as CEA VALRHO Marcoule. The first industrial and military plutonium experiments took place in Marcoule. Diversification of the site was started in the 1970s with the creation of the Phénix prototype fast breeder reactor, which was operational until 2009, and is nowadays an important site for decommissioning nuclear facilities activities.

As of 2016, the Phénix reactor was planned to be succeeded by the sodium-cooled fast reactor ASTRID (Advanced Sodium Technical Reactor for Industrial Demonstration), foreseen to become operational in the 2030s. However, in 2019 the ASTRID project was closed.

Since 1995, the Melox ("Mélange d'Oxydes", Mixture of Oxides) factory has been producing MOX from a mix of uranium and plutonium oxides. MOX is used to recycle plutonium from nuclear fuel; this plutonium comes from the La Hague site.

The ATelier Alpha et Laboratoires pour ANalyses, Transuraniens et Etudes de retraitement (ATALANTE) is a CEA laboratory investigating the issues of nuclear reprocessing of nuclear fuel and of radioactive waste.

== Reactors ==
The site housed a number of the first generation French UNGG reactors, all of which have been shut down. Since then, it has also operated two heavy water reactors to produce tritium. Cooling for all of the plants comes from the Rhône river.

Unit	Type	Net power	Total power	Construction start	Construction finish	Full operation	Shut down
Marcoule G1	UNGG	2 MW		1955	07.01.1956		15.10.1968
Marcoule G2	UNGG	39 MW	43 MW	01.03.1955	22.04.1959	22.04.1959	02.02.1980
Marcoule G3	UNGG	40 MW	43 MW	01.03.1956	04.04.1960	04.04.1960	20.06.1984
Celestin 1	Tritium breeder					1967	2009
Celestin 2	Tritium breeder					1968	2009
Phénix	Fast breeder	130 MW	142 MW	01.03.1968		14.07.1974	01.02.2010

== 2011 explosion ==
On 12 September 2011, there was an explosion in an oven used to melt metallic waste of a "weak and very weak" level of radioactivity, killing one person, and injuring four. The explosion happened in the Centraco centre, used by Socodei, a sister company of Électricité de France. A safety cordon was set up around the plant by fire officers because of the risk of leakage.

== CEA VALRHO Marcoule ==
The CEA in Marcoule have numerous laboratories and research institutes which carry out research into;

- Nuclear reactor waste recycling
- Future nuclear reactor technology (including a fourth generation prototype reactor to be ready by 2030)
- Nuclear decommissioning technology

A science museum for the general public, Visiatome Marcoule, devoted to energy issues is located by the Marcoule site.

While most facilities are located at the main Marcoule site, a small number of facilities at Pierrelatte (located close at the Tricastin Nuclear Site) do also belong to the Marcoule Nuclear Site.

In 2007 over 500 million euros was spent supporting the work of the 30 laboratories.

== Gallery ==
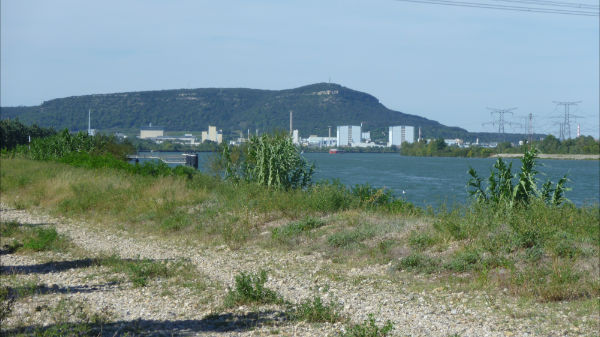
Marcoule Nuclear Site

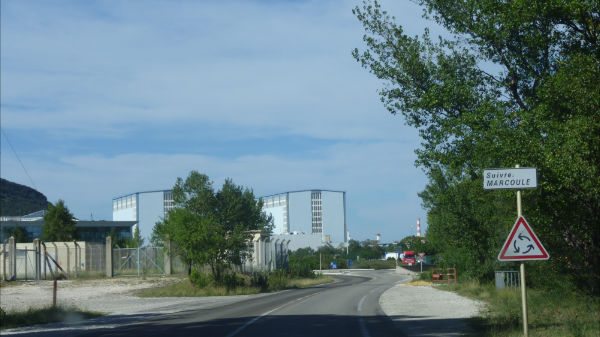
Reactors G2 & G3

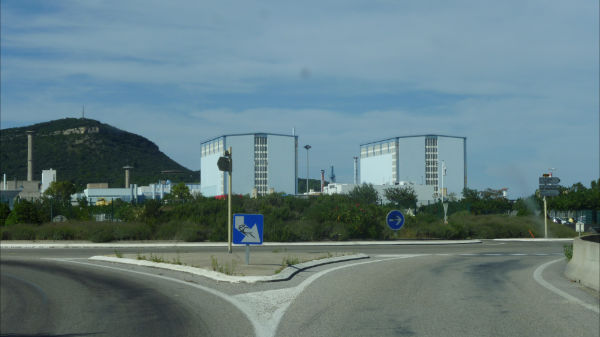
Reactors G2 & G3
