= Astrid Blume =

Danish educator (1872–1924)

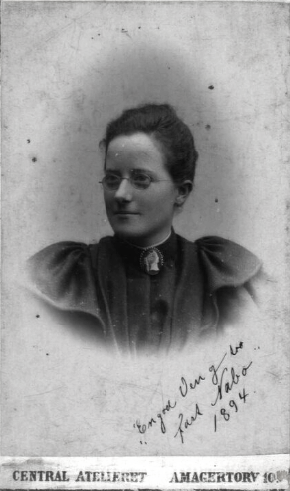
- Born: May 12, 1872; Bording
- Died: March 5, 1924; Aarhus
- Resting place: Nordre Cemetery

Astrid Blume (May 12, 1872 – 1924) was a Danish educator and temperance advocate.

== Biography ==
Astrid Blume was born in Jutland, May 12, 1872. She was president of the Danish branch of the World's Woman's Christian Temperance Union and editor of its organ from 1905 to 1915. She also served as a member of the executive committee of the Young Women's Christian Association of Denmark. She was principal of the Indre Mission's Women's Seminary at Aarhus, Denmark.

Blume died in 1924.
