= Rapsodie =

Retired experimental nuclear reactor in France

Coordinates: 43.6766°N 5.7727°E

Rapsodie was an experimental nuclear reactor built in Cadarache in France.

It was France's first fast reactor, and first achieved criticality in 1967. Rapsodie was a sodium-cooled fast neutron loop-type reactor with a thermal output of 40MW and no electrical generation facilities, and closed in 1983.

Rapsodie was operated in conditions considered representative of a commercial plant in terms of temperatures (inlet 400 °C (752 °F), outlet 550 °C (1,022 °F)) and neutron flux (3.2e15n/cm^2/s), and served to prove many elements used in later, larger, breeder reactors.

Rapsodie operated for 15 years, and suffered two leaks, a sodium micro leak in 1978 that was so small it was never found, and a nitrogen gas leak in 1982.

Rapsodie is currently in Stage 2 decommissioning.

== See also ==
- Fast neutron reactor
