= Superphénix =

Closed nuclear power plant in France

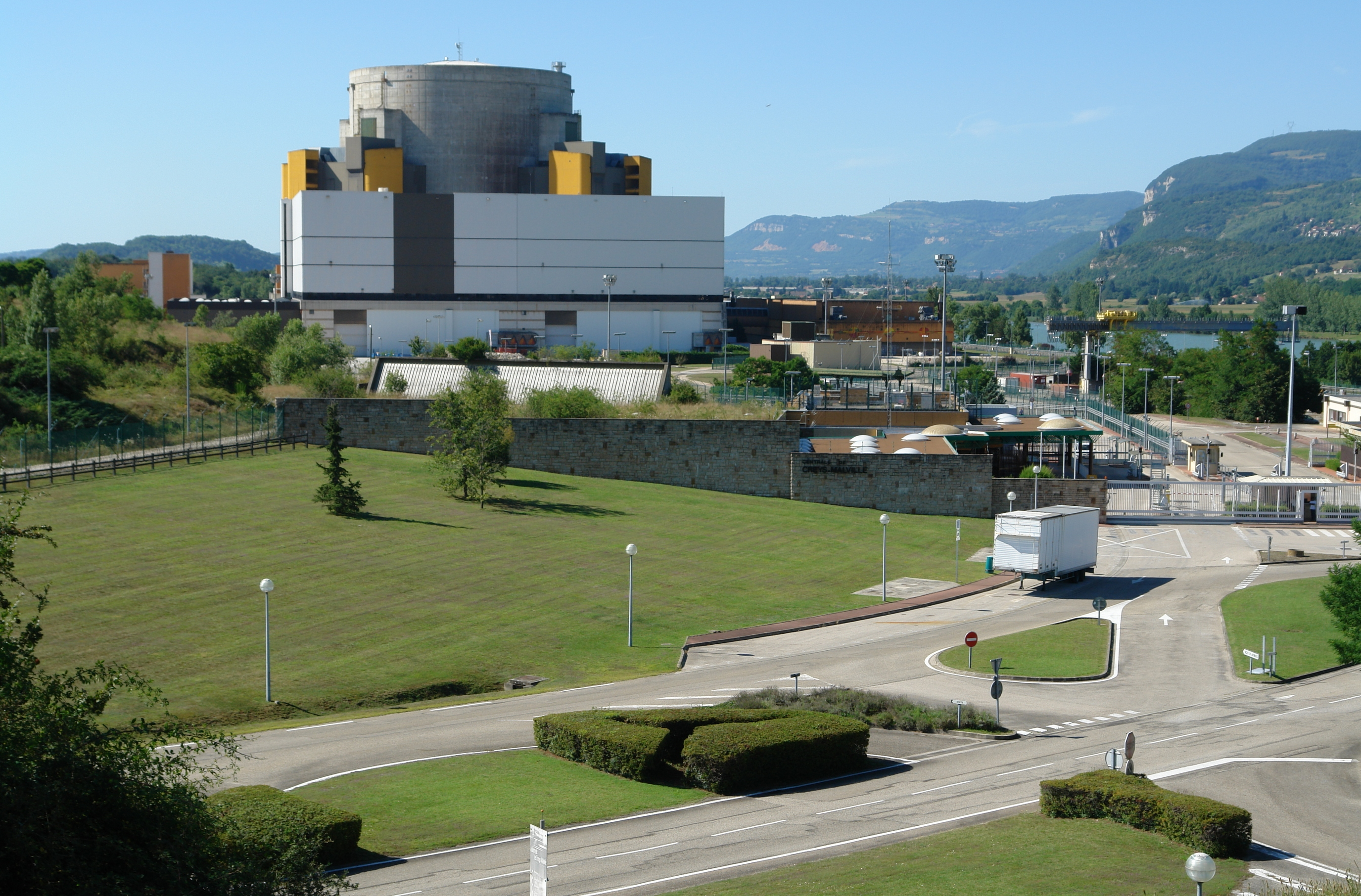
- The Superphenix power plant
- Official name: Site nucléaire de Creys-Malville
- Country: France
- Location: Creys-Malville
- Coordinates: 45°45′30″N 5°28′20″E
- Status: Closed
- Construction began: 1976
- Commission date: 1986; 40 years ago
- Decommission date: 1997; 29 years ago
- Operators: NERSA, EDF (51%); ENEL (33%); SBK (16%)

Nuclear power station
- Reactor type: FBR
- Reactor supplier: Novatome
- Cooling source: Rhône River
- Thermal capacity: 3,000 MW

Power generation
- Make and model: Ansaldo
- Units decommissioned: 1 × 1,242 MW
- Nameplate capacity: 1,242 MW
- Capacity factor: 31.2%
- Annual net output: 3,392 GW·h (1996)

External links
- Commons: Related media on Commons

Superphénix (French pronunciation: [sypɛʁfeniks]; English: Superphoenix, SPX) was a nuclear power station prototype on the Rhône river at Creys-Malville in France, close to the border with Switzerland. Superphénix was a 1,242 MWe fast breeder reactor with the twin goals of reprocessing nuclear fuel from France's line of conventional nuclear reactors, while also being an economical generator of power on its own. As of 2024, Superphénix remains the largest breeder reactor ever built. After a long period of addressing technical issues, the plant had an availability of 95% in 1996.

Construction began in 1976, the reactor went critical in 1985 and was connected to the grid in 1986. The project suffered cost overruns, delays and enormous public protests. Overall, the reactor totalized a very low operation factor of 14.4%. Despite many technical issues related to being a first-of-a-kind project most of its downtime was caused by administrative procedure: the plant was technically capable of resuming operations but was forbidden to do so. Technical problems were solved over time and, by 1996, the plant had reached an availability of 95%.

The plant was powered down in December 1996 for maintenance, and while it was closed it was subject to court challenges that prevented its restart. In June 1997, the newly appointed Prime Minister, Lionel Jospin, announced that Superphénix would be closed permanently; this was made official by ministerial decree in December 1998.

== Design ==
=== Background ===
France had considered the problem of plutonium production just after the end of World War II. At the time, the conventional solution to this problem was to use a graphite moderated air or water cooled reactor fueled with natural uranium, such as the UNGG. Such designs have little economic value in terms of power production, but are simple solutions to the problem of "breeding" plutonium fuel, which can then be separated from the original uranium fuel with chemical processing.

It had long been known that another solution to the breeder reactor design was to replace the graphite with liquid sodium metal. The graphite is used as a moderator, slowing the neutrons released in the nuclear reactions to a speed that makes other uranium atoms receptive to them. If the natural uranium fuel is replaced with fuel sensitive to fast neutrons, typically highly enriched uranium or plutonium, the reaction can run without the use of a moderator.

While this design eliminates the need for a moderator, the core still needs to be cooled. Ideally the coolant would be both highly efficient, allowing the core size to be reduced, as well as being largely transparent to neutrons. The most studied example of such a material is liquid sodium, although salts and other metals have also been used.

This not only greatly reduces the size of the reactor, but the fast neutrons from a single reaction are capable of causing several breeding reactions. By surrounding the core with additional fertile material such as natural uranium, or even nuclear waste from other reactors, the breeding reaction will take place in a larger volume and in otherwise useless materials. This section is known as the blanket. Such a design also has the quality that it generates more fuel than it consumes, as long as the breeding ratio is greater than 1.

Such a design has three major advantages over conventional military designs.

- The entire reaction cycle occurs much faster so it breeds new fuel at a faster rate
- It can use a wider variety of breeding materials because it is not used as the fuel as well
- It generates ample amounts of heat, which can be used to produce power

The downside is that it has to be fueled with some sort of enriched fuel, although the fissile material being bred in the blanket can be used.

=== Earlier work and Phénix ===
Plans for a French fast reactor date as far back as 1958's Rapsodie, and followed up in 1964 for a larger design with a power output of 1 GWe. Construction of the Rapsodie facility started in 1962 and went critical on 28 January 1967. It did not have power producing systems, but its 22 MW of thermal output (MWth) would translate to perhaps 8 MW of electrical output (MWe). Experiments on core configurations were carried out in the Masurca facility starting in 1966, and design of a larger power-producing facility was already well underway.

During the 1960s, interest in nuclear power was reaching a crescendo. For France, with little uranium supply of its own, large-scale nuclear generation would be subject to supply constraints, especially given that nuclear power was experiencing a boom in construction that suggested the available supply would be limited even on a worldwide basis. In France's plans, breeders would serve the twin purposes of producing fuel for its conventional light water reactor fleet, as well as producing that fuel from the waste fuel from those reactors, thereby reducing the amount of nuclear waste it would have to dispose of. Only a small number of breeders, estimated to be around 20, would be required to fuel the fleet of about 200 light water reactors.

France began construction of the Phénix demonstration plant in November 1968, only a year after Rapsodie went critical. It was fueled with 931 kg of reactor grade plutonium with around 77% Pu-239 (weapons grade is at least 93%). The fuel load is capable of running for about 90 days maximum, but in practice it normally ran for two month periods. Due to its design, refueling required the reactor to be shut down. As a result, it had a low capacity factor (CF), on the order of 65%. As a prototype plant, a high CF was not a design goal, although any practical design would have to improve this. Phénix demonstrated a breeding ratio of 1.16, meaning it produced 16% more fuel than it consumed, while also producing 233 MWe in normal operation.

Phénix ran without problems through the 1970s and 1980s, but between 1989 and 1990 experienced 4 power transients which triggered automatic SCRAM. A 1991 report did not clearly identify the cause. In 1993 renovation and life extension works started. The reactor was restarted in 2003 with a reduced power of 130 MWe.

=== Superphénix ===
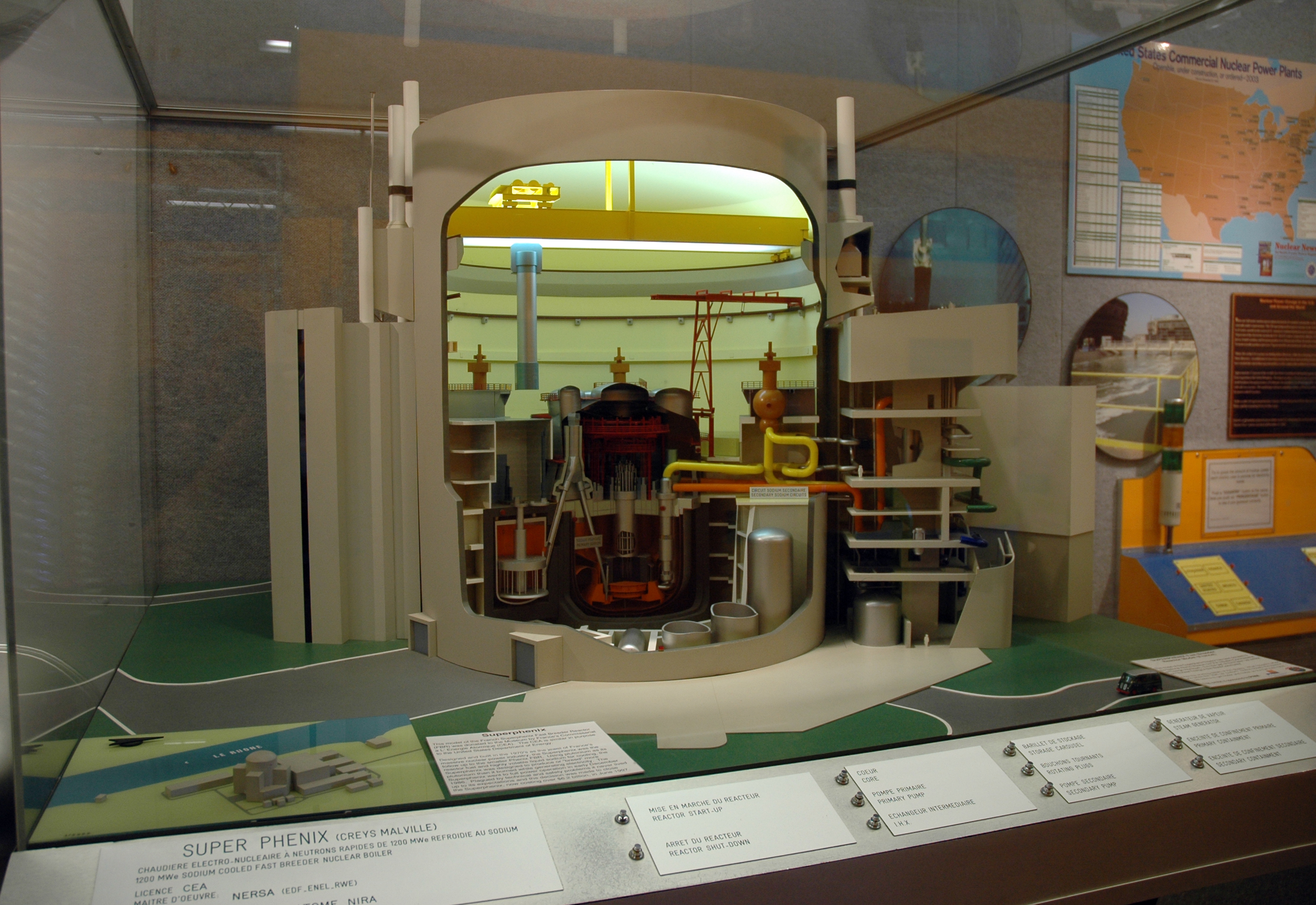
A cut-away model of the Superphenix containment. From the National Atomic Museum in Albuquerque, New Mexico, United States

In 1971 and 1972, France, Germany and Italy signed agreements for the joint construction of full-scale breeders, one in France and one in Germany. The 1973 oil crisis made the issue of fuel security of significant importance. As part of the Messmer Plan, France began to plan for a future in which the vast majority of their electrical power would come from nuclear sources. New priority was given to a follow-on breeder design with the goal of continual operation, high CF, and economic operation even as a stand-alone reactor. This became the Superphénix design.

A public enquiry was carried out over an "excessively short" period from 9 October to 8 November 1974. This led to almost immediate opposition. In November, a group of 80 physicists from the Lyon Physics Institute wrote an open letter about the risks of breeder technology, and in February 1975, about 400 scientists signed their name to an expanded letter. On the other side of the argument, Andre Giraud, head of French Nuclear Commission (CEA), stated that they should carry on with the buildout, warning that delays would have "catastrophic consequences on the uranium savings that are expected." In spite of opposition, Superphénix construction pushed ahead in 1976, although this was not made official until the next year, when initial construction was already underway.

== Construction ==
Design work began in 1968, the same year as construction began for the smaller-scale LMFBR Phénix, following the abandonment of the graphite-gas designs. The fast breeder design was chosen in the face of fears of disruption to the supply of other fuels; the "plutonium economy" seemed viable if oil prices stayed high and uranium supplies dwindled. Construction was approved in 1972 and lasted from 1974 to 1981, but power production did not begin until 1985. Costs rose rapidly during construction. The plant was run by the consortium NERSA, 51% owned by EDF, 33% by ENEL and 16% by SBK (Schneller Brüter Kernkraftwerksgesellschaft).

=== Protest ===
The construction evoked much public protest. For example, a march by 60,000 protestors, which included the Anarchist group Fédération Anarchiste, resulted in the protestors' use of molotov cocktails. This July 1977 protest was finally broken up by the CRS with the death of Vital Michalon and over a hundred serious injuries, with the police using truncheons and firing tear gas grenades to disperse the protestors.

=== Rocket attack ===
Against a background of ongoing protest and low-level sabotage, on the night of January 18, 1982 an RPG-7 rocket-propelled grenade attack was launched against the unfinished plant. Five rockets were fired across the Rhône at the incomplete containment building. Two rockets hit and caused minor damage to the reinforced concrete outer shell, missing the reactor's empty core. Initially there were no claims of responsibility.

On May 8, 2003, Chaïm Nissim, who in 1985 was elected to the Geneva cantonal legislature for the Swiss Green Party, admitted carrying out the attack. He claimed that the weapons were obtained from Carlos the Jackal via the Belgian terrorist organisation Cellules Communistes Combattantes (Communist Combatant Cells).

== Operation ==
Designed electrical power output was 1.20 GW, though year to year its availability was from zero to 33%. As time passed, problems developed from another source: the liquid sodium cooling system suffered from corrosion and leaks. These problems were eventually fixed and in December 1996 the power reached 90% of the nominal power.

In December 1990 structural damage occurred to the turbine hall, following heavy snowfall. Power production did not resume until the Direction de la sûreté des installations nucléaires approved it in 1992.

The plant was connected to EDF grid on 14 January 1986 and produced 4,300 GWh of electricity, worth about a billion 1995 Franc, during 10 months of operation, up until 1994. In 1996 it produced 3,400 GWh, worth about 850 million Francs, during 8 months of operation.

In September 1998, the plant was closed. Two incidents earlier in the year had culminated in a third, which triggered an automatic shutdown.

During 11 years, the plant had 53 months of normal operations (mostly at low power), 25 months of outages due to fixing technical problems of the prototype, and 66 months spent on halt due to political and administrative issues.

== Closure ==
Superphénix had been a focus point of many groups opposed to nuclear power, including the green party Les Verts, since its planning and construction. A national network called Sortir du nucléaire was formed, bringing together hundreds of organisations: local committees, ecological associations, citizen movements and parties.

Power production was halted in December 1996 for maintenance. However, following a court case led by opponents of the reactor, on February 28, 1997, the Conseil d'État (Supreme State Administrative Court) ruled that a 1994 decree, authorizing the restart of Superphénix, was invalid. In June 1997, one of the first actions of Lionel Jospin on becoming prime minister was to announce the closure of the plant because of its excessive costs.

A 1996 report by the French Accounting Office (Cour des Comptes) acknowledge low availability factors (below 10%) but also noticed improvements in 1996 and evaluated that availability above 46% would have made economically convenient to keep the plant open at least up to 2001. The total expenditure on the reactor was estimated at 60 billion francs (9.1 billion euro).

A 1998 "Inquiry commission on Superphenix and fast neutrons reactor sector" reported that "decision to close Superphénix was included in Jospin's program ... in the agreement between Socialist Party and Green Party". Also the same report says "despite many difficulties, the technical results are meaningful". In the explanation of vote at the end of the report, commission members says "give up on Superphenix has been a big error" and "Superphenix has to die because is a symbol".

The last of the 650 fuel rods was removed from the reactor on March 18, 2003. They are now stored in spent fuel pools.

A public inquiry was launched in April 2004 to consider plans to set up a plant to incorporate the 5,500 tonnes of sodium coolant in 70,000 tonnes of concrete. The plan is similar to that used following the closure of the Dounreay Fast Reactor in the United Kingdom.

== See also ==
- List of nuclear reactors
- Nuclear power in France
