= MBIR =

Fast neutron research reactor

- Reactor concept: Fast-neutron reactor
- Status: Under construction since 2015
- Location: Dimitrovgrad, Russia, Russia

Main parameters of the reactor core
- Fuel (fissile material): vibropacked MOX fuel with plutonium content of 38%
- Neutron energy spectrum: Fast
- Primary coolant: sodium (Pb–Bi, gas)

Reactor usage
- Power (thermal): 150 MW
- Power (electric): 55 MW

The MBIR (Russian: Многоцелевой Быстрый Исследовательский Реактор, romanized: Mnogotselevoy Bystryy Issledovatel'skiy Reaktor, lit. 'Multipurpose Fast Research Reactor') is a multi-loop research reactor capable of testing lead, lead-bismuth and gas coolants, and run on MOX fuel. MBIR intends to replace the old BOR-60 experimental fast reactor that started operations at RIAR's site in 1969. It will have a design life of 50 years.

== History ==
Construction has started in 2015. MBIR control assembly was installed in 2019. Reactor vessel was installed in 2023. Pilot fuel elements were produced in 2024. The MBIR is scheduled to begin operation in 2027.

Estimated commissioning date is 2028.

== See also ==
- Generation IV reactor
- BN-800 reactor – generation IV sodium-cooled fast breeder reactor, operational since 2016
- BREST-300 – generation IV lead-cooled fast reactor, in construction since 2020
- Versatile Test Reactor – a similar US project, the funding was canceled in 2022
