= Fast-neutron reactor =

Nuclear reactor where fast neutrons maintain a fission chain reaction

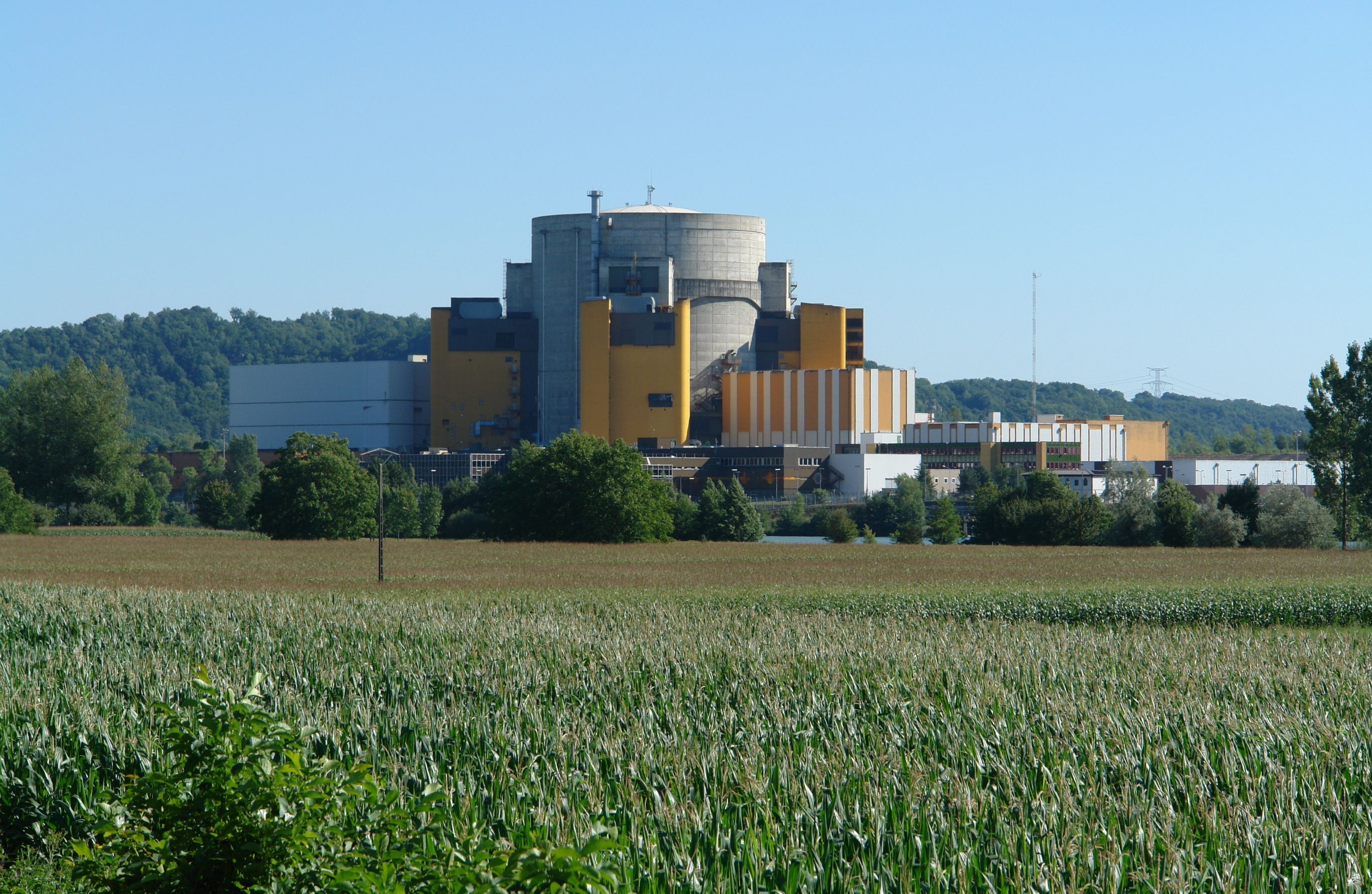
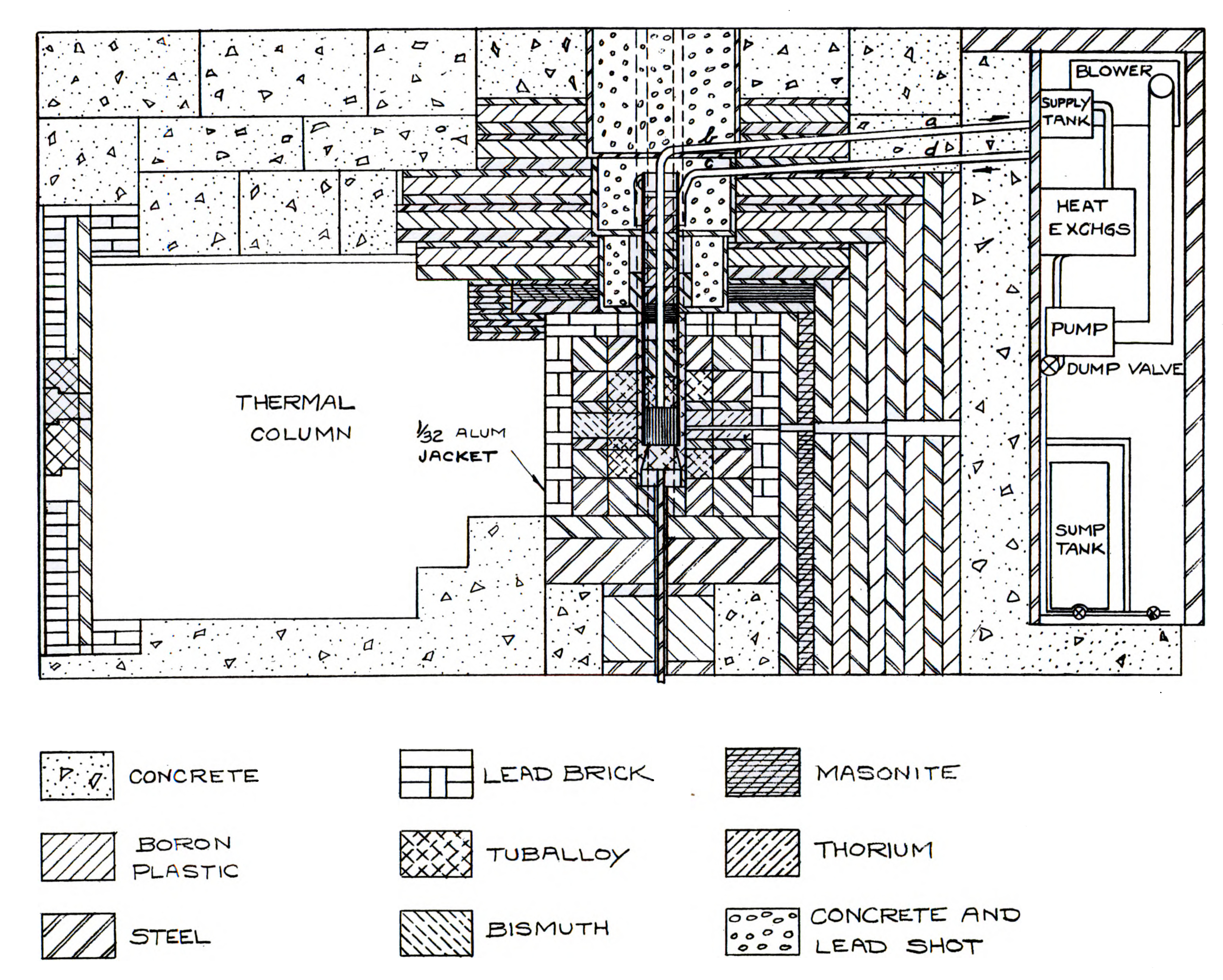
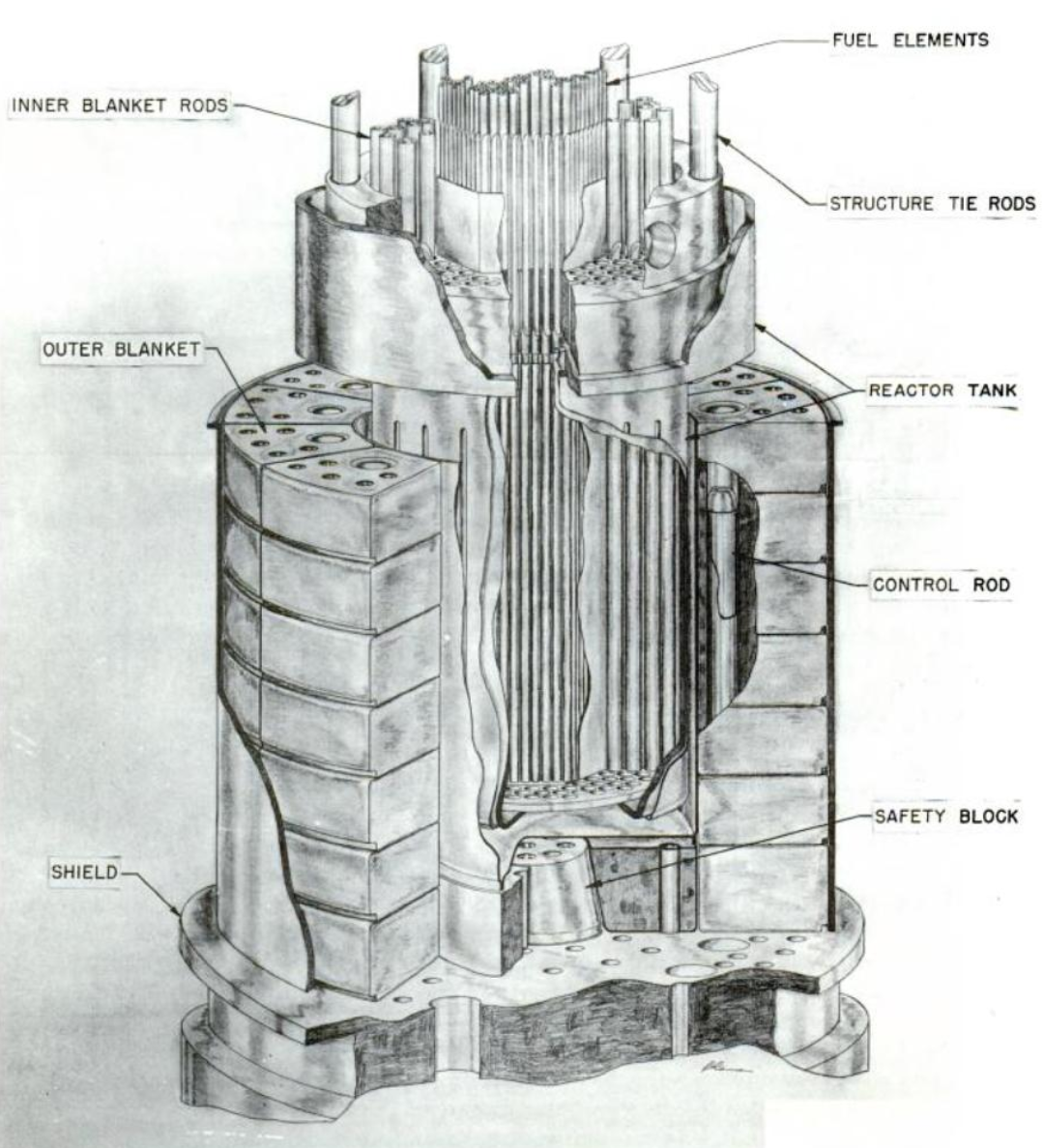
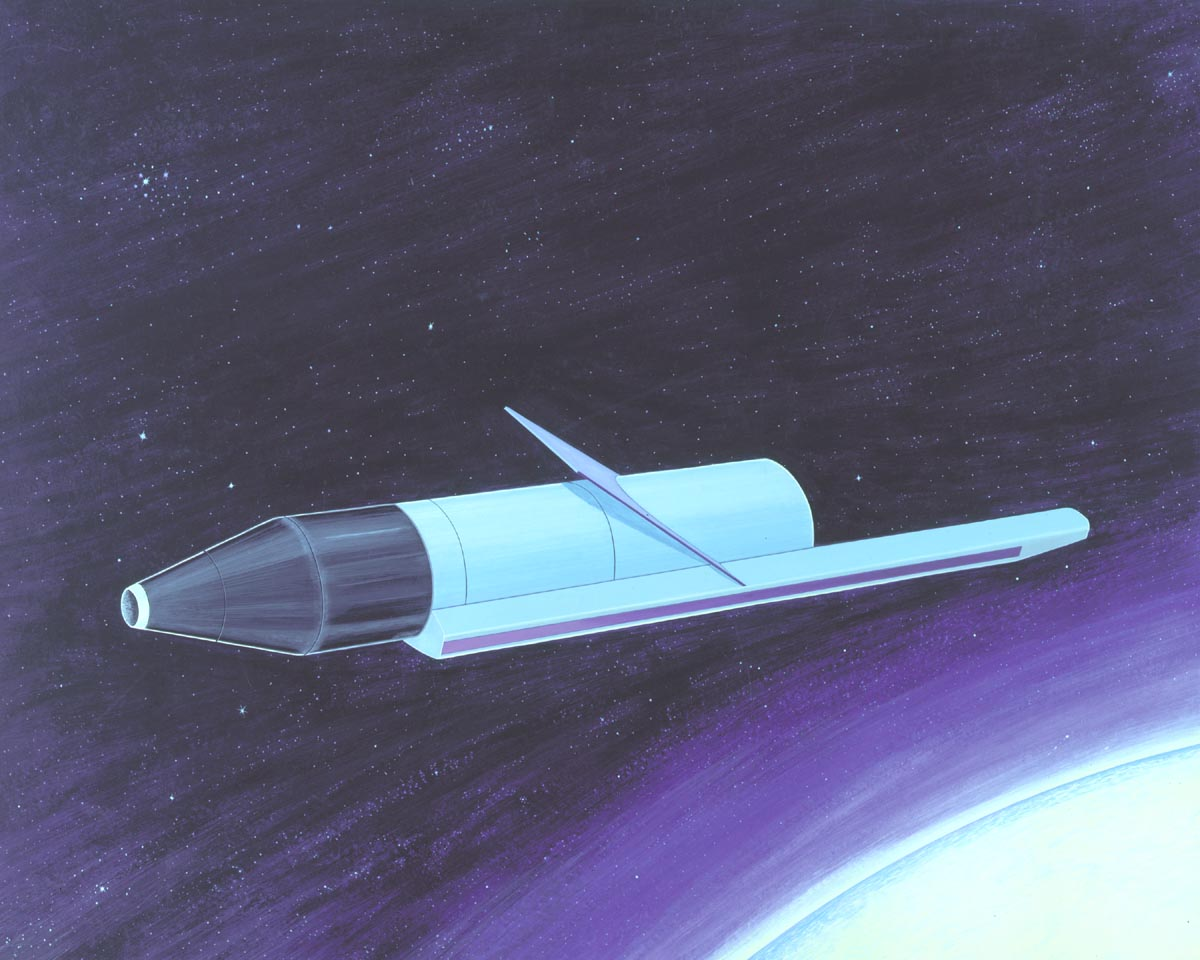
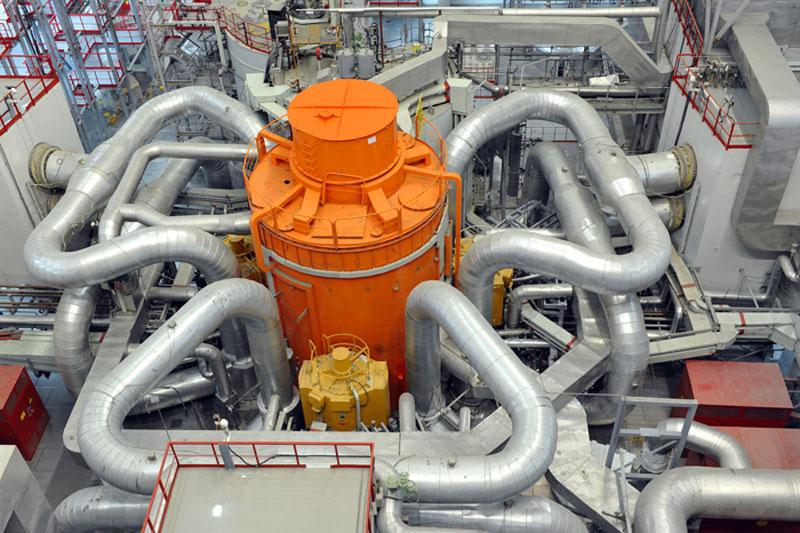
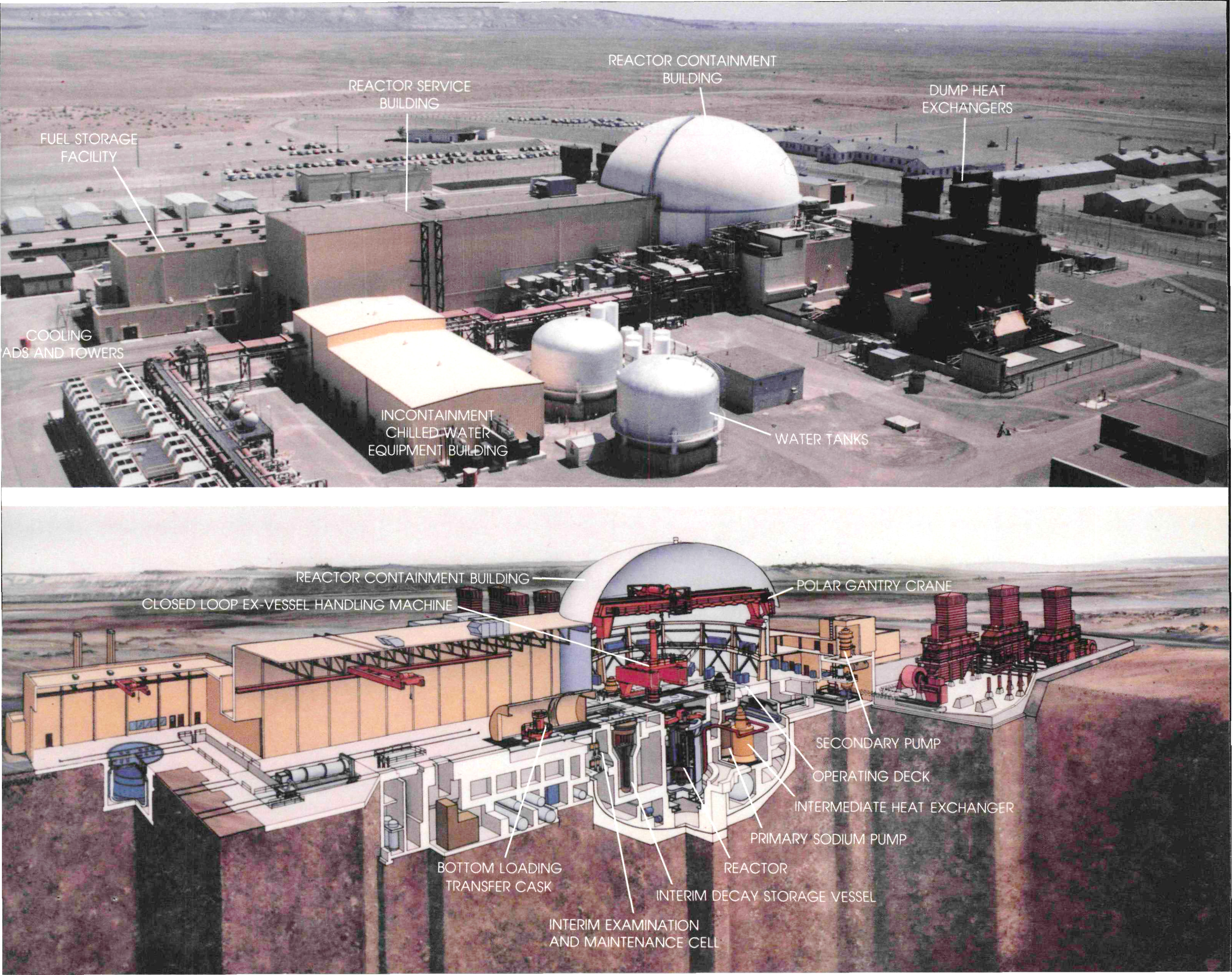
From top, left to right
1. Superphénix, the largest fast reactor ever built
2. Cross-section of Clementine, the first fast reactor
3. EBR-I, the first fast breeder reactor
4. RORSAT Soviet space probe, extensively using the BES-5 reactor
5. BN-800, the largest operating fast reactor
6. Fast Flux Test Facility, a large research fast reactor at the Hanford Site

A fast-neutron reactor (FNR) or fast-spectrum reactor or simply a fast reactor is a category of nuclear reactor in which the fission chain reaction is sustained by fast neutrons (carrying energies above 1 MeV, on average), as opposed to slow thermal neutrons used in thermal-neutron reactors. Such a fast reactor needs no neutron moderator, but requires fuel that is comparatively rich in fissile material.

The fast spectrum is key to breeder reactors, which convert highly abundant uranium-238 into fissile plutonium-239, without requiring enrichment. It also leads to high burnup: many transuranic isotopes, such as of americium and curium, accumulate in thermal reactor spent fuel; in fast reactors they undergo fast fission, reducing total nuclear waste. As a strong fast-spectrum neutron source, they can also be used to transmute existing nuclear waste into manageable or non-radioactive isotopes.

These characteristics also cause fast reactors to be judged a higher nuclear proliferation risk, especially as breeder reactors require nuclear reprocessing, which can be redirected to produce weapons-grade plutonium.

As of 2025, every fast reactor has used a liquid metal coolant, typically sodium-cooled or lead-cooled. (Note: With the exception of small fast critical assemblies) This allows high thermal efficiency, without pressurization systems, however it also contributes to historical high costs and operational difficulties.

In total, 13 fast breeder reactors have been constructed for commercial nuclear power, alongside 65 fast-spectrum research reactors of various configurations. The first fast reactor was Los Alamos National Laboratory's Clementine, operated from 1946. The largest was Superphénix, in France, designed to deliver 1,242 MWe. In the GEN IV initiative, about two thirds of the proposed reactors for the future use a fast spectrum.

== Fission processes ==
Fast reactors operate by the fission of uranium and other heavy atoms, similar to thermal reactors. However, there are crucial differences, arising from the fact that by far most commercial nuclear reactors use a moderator, and fast reactors do not.

=== Moderators in conventional nuclear reactors ===
Natural uranium consists mostly of two isotopes:

- 99.3% ^{238}U
- 0.7% ^{235}U

Of these two, ^{238}U undergoes fission only by fast neutrons. About 0.7% of natural uranium is ^{235}U, which will undergo fission by both fast and slow (thermal) neutrons. When the uranium undergoes fission, it releases neutrons with a high energy ("fast"). However, these fast neutrons have a much lower probability of causing another fission than neutrons which are slowed down after they have been generated by the fission process. Slower neutrons have a much higher chance (about 585 times greater) of causing a fission in ^{235}U than the fast neutrons.

The common solution to this problem is to slow the neutrons down using a neutron moderator, which interacts with the neutrons to slow them. The most common moderator is ordinary water, which acts by elastic scattering until the neutrons reach thermal equilibrium with the water (hence the term "thermal neutron"), at which point the neutrons become highly reactive with the ^{235}U. Other moderators include heavy water, beryllium and graphite. The elastic scattering of the neutrons can be likened to the collision of two ping pong balls; when a fast ping pong ball hits one that is stationary or moving slowly, they will both end up having about half of the original kinetic energy of the fast ball. This is in contrast to a fast ping pong ball hitting a bowling ball, where the ping pong ball keeps virtually all of its energy.

Such thermal neutrons are more likely to be absorbed by another heavy element, such as ^{238}U, ^{232}Th or ^{235}U. In this case, only the ^{235}U has a high probability of fission.

Although ^{238}U undergoes fission by the fast neutrons released in fission about 11% of the time, this can not sustain the chain reaction alone. Neutrons produced by fission of ^{238}U have lower energies than the original neutron, usually below 1 MeV, the fission threshold to cause subsequent fission of ^{238}U, so fission of ^{238}U does not sustain a nuclear chain reaction. When hit by thermal neutrons (i.e. neutrons that have been slowed down by a moderator) the neutron can be captured by the ^{238}U nucleus to transmute the uranium into ^{239}U which rapidly decays into ^{239}Np which in turn decays into ^{239}Pu. ^{239}Pu has a thermal neutron cross section larger than that of ^{235}U.

About 73% of the ^{239}Pu created this way will undergo fission from capturing a thermal neutron while the remaining 27% absorbs a thermal neutron without undergoing fission, creating ^{240}Pu, which rarely fissions with thermal neutrons. When plutonium-240 in turn absorbs a thermal neutron to become a heavier isotope ^{241}Pu which is also fissionable with thermal neutrons very close in probability to plutonium-239. In a fast spectrum reactor all three isotopes have a high probability of fission when absorbing a high energy neutron which limits their accumulation in the fuel.

These effects combined have the result of creating, in a moderated reactor, the presence of the transuranic elements. Such isotopes are themselves unstable, and undergo beta decay to create ever heavier elements, such as americium and curium. Thus, in moderated reactors, plutonium isotopes in many instances do not fission (and so do not release new fast neutrons), but instead just absorb the thermal neutrons. Most moderated reactors use natural uranium or low enriched fuel. As power production continues, around 12–18 months of stable operation in all moderated reactors, the reactor both consumes more fissionable material than it breeds and accumulates neutron absorbing fission products which make it difficult to sustain the fission process. When too much fuel has been consumed the reactor has to be refueled.

=== Drawbacks of light water as the moderator in conventional nuclear reactors ===
The following disadvantages of the use of a moderator have instigated the research and development of fast reactors.

Although cheap, readily available and easily purified, light water can absorb a neutron and remove it from the reaction. It does this enough that the concentration of ^{235}U in natural uranium is too low to sustain the chain reaction; the neutrons lost through absorption in the water and ^{238}U, along with those lost to the environment, results in too few left in the fuel. The most common solution to this problem is to concentrate the amount of ^{235}U in the fuel to produce enriched uranium, with the leftover ^{238}U known as depleted uranium.

Other thermal neutron designs use different moderators, like heavy water or graphite that are much less likely to absorb neutrons, allowing them to run on natural uranium fuel. See CANDU, X-10 Graphite Reactor. In either case, the reactor's neutron economy is based on thermal neutrons.

A second drawback of using water for cooling is that it has a relatively low boiling point. The vast majority of electricity production uses steam turbines. These become more efficient as the pressure (and thus the temperature) of the steam is higher. A water cooled and moderated nuclear reactor therefore needs to operate at high pressures to enable the efficient production of electricity. Thus, such reactors are constructed using very heavy steel vessels, for example 30 cm (12 inch) thick. This high pressure operation adds complexity to reactor design and requires extensive physical safety measures. The vast majority of nuclear reactors in the world are water cooled and moderated with water. Examples include the PWR, the BWR and the CANDU reactors. In Russia and the UK, reactors are operational that use graphite as moderator, the coolant being respectively water in Russian and gas in British reactors.

As the operational temperature and pressure of these reactors is dictated by engineering and safety constraints, both are limited. Thus, the temperatures and pressures that can be delivered to the steam turbine are also limited. Typical water temperatures of a modern pressurized water reactor are around 350 °C (660 °F), with pressures of around 85 bar (1233 psi). Compared to for example modern coal fired steam circuits, where main steam temperatures in excess of 500 °C (930 °F) are obtained, this is low, leading to a relatively low thermal efficiency. In a modern PWR, around 30–33 % of the nuclear heat is converted into electricity.

A third drawback is that when a (any) nuclear reactor is shut down after operation, the fuel in the reactor no longer undergoes fission processes. However, there is an inventory present of highly radioactive elements, some of which generate substantial amounts of heat. If the fuel elements were to be exposed (i.e. there is no water to cool the elements), this heat is no longer removed. The fuel will then start to heat up, and temperatures can then exceed the melting temperature of the zircaloy cladding. When this occurs the fuel elements melt, and a meltdown occurs, such as the multiple meltdowns that occurred in the Fukushima disaster. When the reactor is in shutdown mode, the temperature and pressure are slowly reduced to atmospheric, and thus water will boil at 100 °C (210 °F). This relatively low temperature, combined with the thickness of the steel vessels used, could lead to problems in keeping the fuel cool, as was shown by the Fukushima accident.

Lastly, the fission of uranium and plutonium in a thermal spectrum yields a smaller number of neutrons than in the fast spectrum, so in a fast reactor, more losses are acceptable.

The proposed fast reactors solve all of these problems (next to the fundamental fission properties, where for example plutonium-239 is more likely to fission after absorbing a fast neutron, than a slow one.)

=== Fast fission and breeding ===
Although ^{235}U and ^{239}Pu have a lower capture cross section with higher-energy neutrons, they still remain reactive well into the MeV range. If the density of ^{235}U or ^{239}Pu is sufficient, a threshold will be reached where there are enough fissile atoms in the fuel to maintain a chain reaction with fast neutrons. In fact, in the fast spectrum, when ^{238}U captures a fast neutron it will also undergo fission around 11% of the time with the remainder of captures being "radiative" and entering the decay chain to plutonium-239.

Crucially, when a reactor runs on fast neutrons, the ^{239}Pu isotope is likely to fission 74% of the time instead of the 62% of fissions when it captures a thermal neutron. In addition, the probability of a ^{240}Pu atom fissioning upon absorbing a fast neutron is 70% while for a thermal neutron it is less than 20%. Fast neutrons have a smaller chance of being captured by the uranium and plutonium, but when they are captured, have a significantly higher probability of causing a fission. The inventory of spent fast reactor fuel therefore contains virtually no actinides except for uranium and plutonium, which can be effectively recycled. Even when the core is initially loaded with 20% mass reactor-grade plutonium (containing on average 2% ^{238}Pu, 53% ^{239}Pu, 25% ^{240}Pu, 15% ^{241}Pu, 5% ^{242}Pu and traces of ^{244}Pu), the fast spectrum neutrons are capable of causing each of these to fission at significant rates. By the end of a fuel cycle of some 24 months, these ratios will have shifted with an increase of ^{239}Pu to over 80% while all the other plutonium isotopes will have decreased in proportion.

By removing the moderator, the size of the reactor core volume can be greatly reduced, and to some extent the complexity. As ^{239}Pu and particularly ^{240}Pu are far more likely to fission when they capture a fast neutron, it is possible to fuel such reactors with a mixture of plutonium and natural uranium, or with enriched material, containing around 20% ^{235}U. Test runs at various facilities have also been done using ^{233}U and ^{232}Th. The natural uranium (mostly ^{238}U) will be turned into ^{239}Pu, while in the case of ^{232}Th, ^{233}U is the result. As new fuel is created during the operation, this process is called breeding. All fast reactors can be used for breeding, or by carefully selecting the materials in the core and eliminating the blanket they can be operated to maintain the same level of fissionable material without creating any excess material. This is a process called Conversion because it transmutes fertile materials into fissile fuels on a 1:1 basis. By surrounding the reactor core with a blanket of ^{238}U or ^{232}Th which captures excess neutrons, the extra neutrons breed more ^{239}Pu or ^{233}U respectively.

The blanket material can then be processed to extract the new fissile material, which can then be mixed with depleted uranium to produce MOX fuel, mixed with lightly enriched uranium fuel to form REMIX fuel, both for conventional slow-neutron reactors. Alternatively it can be mixed as in greater percentage of 17–19.75% fissile fuel for fast reactor cores. A single fast reactor can thereby supply its own fuel indefinitely as well as feed several thermal ones, greatly increasing the amount of energy extracted from the natural uranium. The most effective breeder configuration theoretically is able to produce 14 ^{239}Pu nuclei for every 10 (14:10) actinide nuclei consumed, however real world fast reactors have so far achieved a ratio of 12:10 ending the fuel cycle with 20% more fissile material than they held at the start of the cycle. Less than 1% of the total uranium mined is consumed in a thermal once-through cycle, while up to 60% of the natural uranium is fissioned in the best existing fast reactor cycles.

Given the current inventory of spent nuclear fuel (which contains reactor grade plutonium), it is possible to process this spent fuel material and reuse the actinide isotopes as fuel in a large number of fast reactors. This effectively consumes the ^{237}Np, reactor-grade plutonium, ^{241}Am, and ^{244}Cm. Enormous amounts of energy are still present in the spent reactor fuel inventories; if fast reactor types were to be employed to use this material, that energy can be extracted for useful purposes.

== Waste recycling ==
Fast-neutron reactors can potentially reduce the radiotoxicity of nuclear waste. Each commercial scale reactor would have an annual waste output of a little more than a ton of fission products, plus trace amounts of transuranics if the most highly radioactive components could be recycled. The remaining waste should be stored for about 500 years.

With fast neutrons, the ratio between splitting and the capture of neutrons by plutonium and the minor actinides is often larger than when the neutrons are slower, at thermal or near-thermal "epithermal" speeds. Simply put, fast neutrons have a smaller chance of being absorbed by plutonium or uranium, but when they are, they almost always cause a fission. The transmuted even-numbered actinides (e.g. ^{240}Pu, ^{242}Pu) split nearly as easily as odd-numbered actinides in fast reactors. After they split, the actinides become a pair of "fission products". These elements have less total radiotoxicity. Since disposal of the fission products is dominated by the most radiotoxic fission products, strontium-90, which has a half-life of 28.8 years, and caesium-137, which has a half-life of 30.1 years, the result is the reduction of nuclear waste lifetimes from tens of millennia (from transuranic isotopes) to a few centuries. The processes are not perfect, but the remaining transuranics are reduced from a significant problem to a tiny percentage of the total waste, because most transuranics can be used as fuel.

Fast reactors technically solve the "fuel shortage" argument against uranium-fueled reactors without assuming undiscovered reserves, or extraction from dilute sources such as granite or seawater. They permit nuclear fuels to be bred from almost all the actinides, including known, abundant sources of depleted uranium and thorium, and light-water reactor wastes. On average, more neutrons per fission are produced by fast neutrons than from thermal neutrons. This results in a larger surplus of neutrons beyond those required to sustain the chain reaction. These neutrons can be used to produce extra fuel, or to transmute long half-life waste to less troublesome isotopes, as was done at the Phénix reactor in Marcoule, France, or some can be used for each purpose. Though conventional thermal reactors also produce excess neutrons, fast reactors can produce enough of them to breed more fuel than they consume. Such designs are known as fast breeder reactors.

In the spent fuel from water moderated reactors, several plutonium isotopes are present, along with the heavier, transuranic elements. Nuclear reprocessing, a complex series of chemical extraction processes, mostly based on the PUREX process, can be used to extract the unchanged uranium, the fission products, the plutonium, and the heavier elements. Such waste streams can be divided in categories; 1) unchanged uranium-238, which is the vast bulk of the material and has a very low radioactivity, 2) a collection of fission products and 3) the transuranic elements.

== Coolant ==
All nuclear reactors produce heat which must be removed from the reactor core. Water, the most common coolant in thermal reactors, is generally not feasible for a fast reactor, because it acts as an effective neutron moderator.

All operating fast reactors are liquid metal cooled reactors, which use sodium, lead, or lead-bismuth eutectic as coolants. The early Clementine reactor used mercury coolant and plutonium metal fuel. In addition to its toxicity to humans, mercury has a high capture cross section (thus, it readily absorbs the neutrons, which causes nuclear reactions) for the (n,gamma) reaction, causing activation in the coolant and losing neutrons that could otherwise be absorbed in the fuel, which is why it is no longer considered useful as a coolant.

Russia has developed reactors that use molten lead and lead–bismuth eutectic alloys, which have been used on a larger scale in naval propulsion units, particularly the Soviet Alfa-class submarine, as well as some prototype reactors. Sodium–potassium alloy (NaK) is popular in test reactors due to its low melting point.

Another proposed fast reactor is a molten salt reactor, in which the salt's moderating properties are insignificant. The particular salt formula used is crucial as some formulas are effective moderators while others are not.

Gas-cooled fast reactors have been the subject of research commonly using helium, which has small absorption and scattering cross sections, thus preserving the fast neutron spectrum without significant neutron absorption in the coolant. Purified nitrogen-15 has also been proposed as a coolant gas because it is more common than helium and also has a very low neutron absorption cross section.

However, all large-scale fast reactors have used molten metal coolant. Advantages of molten metals are low cost, the small activation potential and the large liquid ranges. The latter means that the material has a low melting point, and a high boiling point. Examples of these reactors include Sodium cooled fast reactor, which are still being pursued worldwide. Russia currently operates two such reactors on a commercial scale. Additionally, Russia has around eighty reactor years of experience with the Lead-cooled fast reactor which is rapidly gaining interest.

== Fuel ==
In practice, sustaining a fission chain reaction with fast neutrons means using relatively enriched uranium or plutonium. The reason for this is that fissile reactions are favored at thermal energies, since the ratio between the ^{239}Pu fission cross section and ^{238}U absorption cross section is ~100 in a thermal spectrum and 8 in a fast spectrum. Fission and absorption cross sections are low for both ^{239}Pu and ^{238}U at high (fast) energies, which means that fast neutrons are likelier to pass through fuel without interacting than thermal neutrons; thus, more fissile material is needed. Therefore, a fast reactor cannot run on natural uranium fuel. However, it is possible to build a fast reactor that breeds fuel by producing more than it consumes. After the initial fuel charge such a reactor can be refueled by reprocessing. Fission products can be replaced by adding natural or even depleted uranium without further enrichment. This is the concept of the fast breeder reactor or FBR.

So far, most fast-neutron reactors have used either MOX (mixed oxide) or metal alloy fuel. Soviet fast-neutron reactors used (highly ^{235}U enriched) uranium fuel initially, then in 2022 switched to using MOX. The Indian prototype reactor uses uranium-carbide fuel.

While criticality at fast energies may be achieved with uranium enriched to 5.5 (weight) percent ^{235}U, fast reactor designs have been proposed with enrichment in the range of 20 percent for reasons including core lifetime: if a fast reactor were loaded with the minimal critical mass, then the reactor would become subcritical after the first fission. Rather, an excess of fuel is inserted with reactivity control mechanisms, such that the reactivity control is inserted fully at the beginning of life to bring the reactor from supercritical to critical; as the fuel is depleted, the reactivity control is withdrawn to support continuing fission. In a fast breeder reactor, the above applies, though the reactivity from fuel depletion is also compensated by breeding either ^{233}U or ^{239}Pu and ^{241}Pu from ^{232}Th or ^{238}U, respectively. Some designs use burnable poisons also known as burnable absorbers which contain isotopes with high neutron capture cross sections. Concentrated ^{10}Boron or ^{155}Gadolinium & ^{157}Gadolinium in natural gadolinium are typically used for this purpose. As these isotopes absorb excess neutrons they are transmuted into isotopes with low absorption cross sections so that over the life of the fuel cycle they are eliminated as more fission products with high capture cross section are generated. This makes it easier to maintain control of the reactivity rate in the core at start up with fresh fuel.

== Control ==
Like thermal reactors, fast-neutron reactors are controlled by keeping the criticality of the reactor reliant on delayed neutrons, with gross control from neutron-absorbing control rods or blades.

They cannot, however, rely on changes to their moderators because there is no moderator. So Doppler broadening in the moderator, which affects thermal neutrons, does not work, nor does a negative void coefficient of the moderator. Both techniques are common in ordinary light-water reactors.

Doppler broadening from the molecular motion of the fuel, from its heat, can provide rapid negative feedback. The molecular movement of the fissionables themselves can tune the fuel's relative speed away from the optimal neutron speed. Thermal expansion of the fuel can provide negative feedback. Small reactors as in submarines may use Doppler broadening or thermal expansion of neutron reflectors.

== Resources ==
As the perception of the reserves of uranium ore in the 1960s was rather low, and the rate that nuclear power was expected to take over baseload generation, through the 1960s and 1970s fast breeder reactors were considered to be the solution to the world's energy needs. Using twice-through processing, a fast breeder increases the energy capacity of known ore deposits, meaning that existing ore sources would last hundreds of years. The disadvantage to this approach is that the breeder reactor has to be fed fuel that must be treated in a spent fuel treatment plant. It was widely expected that this would still be below the price of enriched uranium as demand increased and known resources dwindled.

Through the 1970s, experimental breeder designs were examined, especially in the US, France and the USSR. However, this coincided with a crash in uranium prices. The expected increased demand led mining companies to expand supply channels, which came online just as the rate of reactor construction stalled in the mid-1970s. The resulting oversupply caused fuel prices to decline from about US$40 per pound in 1980 to less than $20 by 1984. Breeders produced fuel that was much more expensive, on the order of $100 to $160, and the few units that reached commercial operation proved to be economically unfeasible.

== Advantages ==
Fast reactors are widely seen as an essential development because of several advantages over moderated designs. The most studied and built fast reactor type is the sodium-cooled fast reactor. Some of the advantages of this design are discussed below; other designs such as the lead-cooled fast reactor and FMSR, Fast Molten Salt Reactor have similar advantages.

- A fission event creates more neutrons than in the thermal reactor. This gives flexibility and allows breeding of uranium or thorium.
- As ^{238}U absorbing a fast neutron has an 11% probability of fissioning, a significant percentage of the fission events in the reactor occur with this isotope.
- There is a fine balance between the production of neutrons from fission on the one hand, and the many processes that remove them from the equation on the other. If the temperature increases in a fast reactor, this will have two effects:
  1. Doppler broadening of the neutron spectrum, and
  2. a very small increase in the physical size of the reactor core.

These two effects serve to reduce the reactivity because it allows more neutrons to escape the core, as was shown in a demonstration at EBR-II in 1986. In this test, the additional heat was readily absorbed by the large volume of liquid sodium, and the reactor shut itself down, without operator intervention.

- Because sodium has a boiling point of 883 °C (1,600 °F), and lead has a boiling point of 1,749 °C (3,200 °F) but reactors operate typically around 500 °C (930 °F) to 550 °C (1,000 °F), there is a large margin where the metals will stay liquid, and thermal increases can be easily absorbed, without any pressure increase. For the Chloride salts typically used in fast molten salt reactor designs the Sodium Chloride has a boiling point of 1,465 °C (2,700 °F)
- As no water is present in the core at high temperatures, the reactor is essentially at atmospheric pressure. Most often, an inert gas blanket at a modest pressure (e.g. 0.5 atmospheres) is present to ensure that any leak results in mass transport to the outside of the reactor. This means that there is no pressure vessel with associated problems (high pressure systems are complex), nor will a leak from the reactor emit high pressure jets.
- The entire vessel being at atmospheric pressure, and the sodium is very hot, and can be allowed to remain at these temperatures even in shutdown, passive cooling (i.e. no pumping requirements) with air is possible. Accidents such as the Fukushima Daiichi nuclear accident are impossible with such a design.
- The higher temperature of the liquid metal or salt, and therefore the higher temperature of the steam generated by this coolant, allows a considerable increase in the electric generating efficiency (around 40% thermal efficiency, as opposed to 30%).
- Such reactors have the potential to significantly reduce the waste streams from nuclear power, while at the same time increasing vastly the fuel utilization.

== Disadvantages ==
As most fast reactors to date have been either sodium, lead or lead-bismuth cooled, the disadvantages of such systems are described here.

- As a result of running the reactors on fast neutrons, the reactivity of the core is determined by these neutrons, as opposed to moderated reactors. In the moderated reactors, a significant amount of control of the reactivity is obtained from delayed neutrons, which allow time for operators or computers to adjust reactivity. As delayed neutrons play virtually no role in fast reactors, other mechanisms are required for the very short term reactivity control (e.g. within one second) in fast reactors, which are thermal expansion and Doppler broadening. Longer term reactivity is obtained from control rods, which are filled with a neutron absorption material.
- As the entire reactor is filled with large volumes of molten metal, refuelling is not trivial, as optical tools (cameras, etc.) are of no use. Costly, carefully calibrated and positioned robotic tools are needed for the operation of refueling. Also, completely removing fuel elements from the reactor is not easy.
- The fact that the entire reactor is filled with a metal that has a melting point much higher than room temperature, all the tubing, heat exchangers, and the entire reactor volume must be heated electrically, before any nuclear operation can take place. However, once the reactor produces heat, this is no longer of any concern.
- To date most fast reactor types have proven costly to build and operate, and are not very competitive with thermal-neutron reactors unless the price of uranium increased dramatically, or building costs decreased. It is thought that given the perception of problematic nuclear waste disposal, such reactors will be necessary. As moderated reactor construction costs are rising (among other) due to ever more stringent safety mechanisms, this could mean a better economic viability of fast reactors.
- Sodium is often used as a coolant in fast reactors, because it does not moderate neutron speeds much and has a high heat capacity. However, it burns and foams in air, although the combustion reaction of sodium in air should not be confused with the extremely violent reaction of sodium and water. Sodium leaks can ignite with air, causing difficulties in reactors such as (e.g. USS Seawolf (SSN-575) and Monju).

Some sodium-cooled fast reactors have operated safely for long periods (notably the Phénix and EBR-II for 30 years, or the BN-600 and BN-800 in operation since resp. 1980 and 2016, despite several minor leaks and fires. Sodium leaks (and possibly fires) do not release radioactive elements, as the sodium fast reactors are always designed with a two loop system.

- Since liquid metals other than lithium and beryllium have low moderating ability, the primary interaction of neutrons with fast reactor coolant is the (n,gamma) reaction, which induces radioactivity in the coolant. Sodium-24 (^{24}Na) is created in the reactor loop of the sodium cooled fast reactor, from natural sodium-23 by neutron bombardment. With a 15-hour half-life, ^{24}Na decays to ^{24}Mg by emission of an electron and two gamma rays. As the half-life of this isotope is very short, after e.g. two weeks, almost no ^{24}Na is left. Fast spectrum reactors that use sodium must remove this magnesium from the sodium, which is achieved with a 'cold' trap.
- From the liquid lead or lead-bismuth eutectic designs, only the liquid eutectic lead-bismuth will have activation. As pure lead will have virtually no activation, a pure lead reactor design could operate in a single loop, saving significant costs on heat exchanger and separate systems.
- A defective fast reactor design could have positive void coefficient: boiling of the coolant in an accident would reduce coolant density and thus the absorption rate. No such designs are proposed for commercial service, as they are potentially dangerous and undesirable from a safety and accident standpoint. This can be avoided with a gas-cooled reactor, since voids do not form in such a reactor during an accident; however, reactivity control in a gas cooled fast reactor is difficult.
- Due to the low cross sections of most materials at high neutron energies, critical mass in a fast reactor is much higher than in a thermal reactor. In practice, this means significantly higher enrichment: >20% enrichment in a fast reactor compared to <5% enrichment in typical thermal reactors. Alternatively, a mixture of plutonium from nuclear waste, combined with natural or depleted uranium could be used.

== History ==
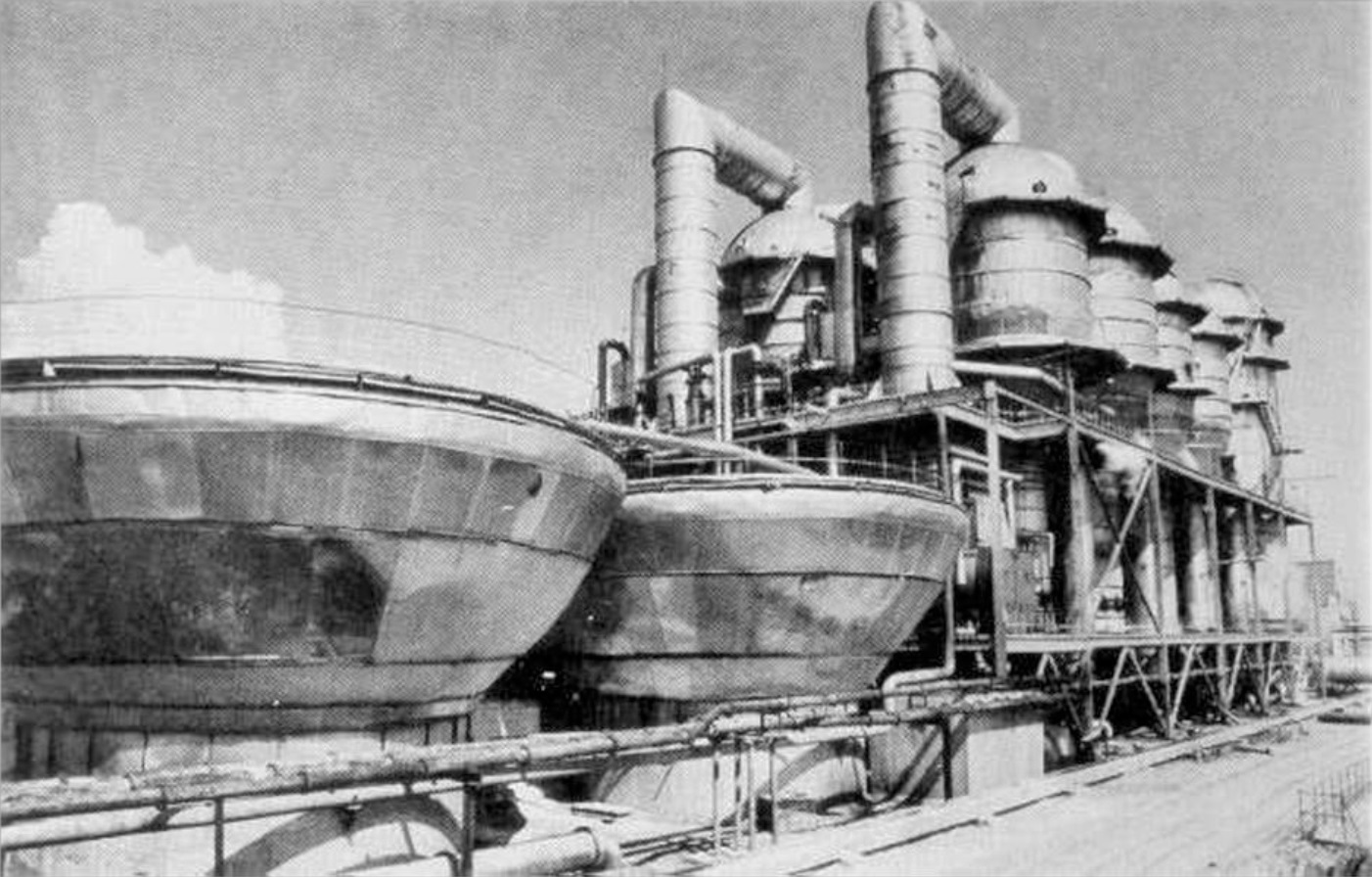
The BN-350 reactor was also used for desalination of sea water.

US interest in breeder reactors were muted by Jimmy Carter's April 1977 decision to defer construction of breeders in the US due to proliferation concerns, and the suboptimal operating record of France's Superphénix reactor. The French reactors also met with serious opposition of environmentalist groups, who regarded these as very dangerous. Despite such setbacks, a number of countries still invest in the fast reactor technology. Around 25 reactors have been built since the 1970s, accumulating over 400 reactor years of experience.

A 2008 IAEA proposal for a Fast Reactor Knowledge Preservation System noted that:

during the past 15 years there has been stagnation in the development of fast reactors in the industrialized countries that were involved, earlier, in intensive development of this area. All studies on fast reactors have been stopped in countries such as Germany, Italy, the United Kingdom and the United States of America and the only work being carried out is related to the decommissioning of fast reactors. Many specialists who were involved in the studies and development work in this area in these countries have already retired or are close to retirement. In countries such as France, Japan and the Russian Federation that are still actively pursuing the evolution of fast reactor technology, the situation is aggravated by the lack of young scientists and engineers moving into this branch of nuclear power.

As of 2021, Russia operates two fast reactors on a commercial scale. The GEN IV initiative, an international working group on new reactor designs has proposed six new reactor types, three of which would operate with a fast spectrum.

== List of fast reactors ==
=== Decommissioned reactors ===
==== United States ====
- Clementine was the first fast reactor, built in 1946 at Los Alamos National Laboratory. It used plutonium metal fuel, mercury coolant, achieved 25 kW thermal and used for research, especially as a fast neutron source.
- Experimental Breeder Reactor I (EBR-I) at Argonne West, now Idaho National Laboratory, near Arco, Idaho, in 1951 became the first reactor to generate significant amounts of power. Decommissioned in 1964.
- Fermi 1 near Detroit was a prototype fast breeder reactor that powered up in 1957 and shut down in 1972.
- Experimental Breeder Reactor II (EBR-II) at Idaho National Laboratory, near Arco, Idaho, was a prototype for the Integral Fast Reactor, 1965–1994.
- SEFOR in Arkansas, was a 20 MWt research reactor that operated from 1969 to 1972.
- Fast Flux Test Facility (FFTF), 400 MWt, operated flawlessly from 1982 to 1992, at Hanford Washington. It used liquid sodium drained with argon backfill under care and maintenance.
- SRE in California, was a 20 MWt, 6.5 MWe commercial reactor operated from 1957 to 1964.
- LAMPRE-1 was a molten plutonium fueled 1 MWth reactor. It operated as a research reactor from 1961 to 1963 at Los Alamos national Lab.

==== Europe ====
- Dounreay Loop type Fast Reactor (DFR), 1959–1977, was a 14 MWe and Prototype Fast Reactor (PFR), 1974–1994, 250 MWe, in Caithness, in the Highland area of Scotland.
- Dounreay Pool type Fast Reactor (PFR), 1975–1994, was a 600 MWt, 234 MWe which used mixed oxide (MOX) fuel.
- Rapsodie in Cadarache, France, (20 then 40 MW) operated between 1967 and 1982.
- Superphénix, in France, 1200 MWe, closed in 1997 due to a political decision and high costs.
- Phénix, 1973, France, 233 MWe, restarted 2003 at 140 MWe for experiments on transmutation of nuclear waste for six years, ceased power generation in March 2009, though continuing in test operation and research programs by CEA until the end of 2009. Stopped in 2010.
- KNK-II, in Germany a 21 MWe experimental compact sodium-cooled fast reactor operated from Oct 1977 – Aug 1991. The objective of the experiment was to eliminate nuclear waste while producing energy. There were minor sodium problems combined with public protests which resulted in the closure of the facility.

==== USSR/Russia ====
- Small lead-cooled fast reactors were used for naval propulsion, particularly by the Soviet Navy.
- BR-5 – was a research-focused fast-neutron reactor at the Institute of Physics and Energy in Obninsk from 1959 to 2002.
- BN-350 was constructed by the Soviet Union in Shevchenko (today's Aqtau) on the Caspian Sea, It produced 130 MWe plus 80,000 tons of fresh water per day.
- IBR was a research-focused pulsed fast-neutron reactor at the Joint Institute of Nuclear Research in Dubna (near Moscow) put into operation in 1984 till 2006.
- RORSATs – 33 space fast reactors were launched by the Soviet Union from 1989 to 1990 as part of a program known as the Radar Ocean Reconnaissance Satellite (RORSAT) in the US. Typically, the reactors produced approximately 3 kWe.
- BES-5 – was a sodium cooled space reactor launched as part of the RORSAT program which produced 5 kWe.
- BR-5 – was a 5 MWt sodium fast reactor operated by the USSR in 1961 primarily for materials testing.
- Russian Alpha 8 PbBi – was a series of lead-bismuth cooled fast reactors used aboard submarines. The submarines functioned as killer submarines, staying in harbor then attacking due to the high speeds achievable by the sub.

==== Asia ====
- Monju reactor, 300 MWe, in Japan, was closed in 1995 following a serious sodium leak and fire. It was restarted on May 6, 2010, but in August 2010 another accident, involving dropped machinery, shut down the reactor again. As of June 2011, the reactor had generated electricity for only one hour since its first test two decades prior.
- Aktau Reactor, 150 MWe, in Kazakhstan, was used for plutonium production, desalination, and electricity. It closed 4 years after the plant's operating license expired.

=== Never operated ===
- Clinch River Breeder Reactor, United States
- Integral Fast Reactor, United States. Design emphasized fuel cycle based on on-site electrolytic reprocessing. Cancelled in 1994 without construction.
- SNR-300, Germany

=== Active ===
- IBR-2 – a pulsed fast-neutron reactor at Joint Institute for Nuclear Research in Dubna. Located at the Laboratory of Neutron Physics (FLNP) named after. I.M. Frank as part of JINR. From 2006 to June 2011 it underwent modernization. It is the only nuclear reactor in the world with a movable reflector. Commissioned on February 10, 1984.
- BN-600 – a pool type sodium-cooled fast breeder reactor at the Beloyarsk Nuclear Power Station. It provides 560 MWe to the Middle Urals power grid. In operation since 1980.
- BN-800 – a sodium-cooled fast breeder reactor at the Beloyarsk Nuclear Power Station. It generates 880 MW of electrical power and started producing electricity in October, 2014. It reached full power in August, 2016.
- BOR-60 – a sodium-cooled reactor at the Research Institute of Atomic Reactors in Dimitrovgrad, Russia. In operation since 1968. It produces 60MW for experimental purposes.
- FBTR – a 40MWt,13.2MWe experimental reactor in India which focused on reaching significant burnup levels.
- China Experimental Fast Reactor, a 60 MWth, 20 MWe, experimental reactor which went critical in 2011 and is currently operational. It is used for materials and component research for future Chinese fast reactors.
- KiloPower/KRUSTY is a 1–10 kWe research sodium fast reactor built at Los Alamos National Laboratory. It first reach criticality in 2015 and demonstrates an application of a Stirling power cycle.

=== Under repair ===
- Jōyō (常陽), 1977–1997 and 2004–2007, Japan, 140 MWt is an experimental reactor, operated as an irradiation test facility. After an incident in 2007, the reactor was suspended for repairing, recovery work was planned to be completed in 2014. Joyo (Japan's only experimental fast reactor) is expected to be restarted at the end of 2026. The reactor will contribute towards research of medical radioisotopes production for cancer treatment and research on radiotoxicity of radioactive waste.

=== Under commissioning ===
- PFBR, India's 500 MWe Prototype Fast Breeder Reactor achieved criticality on April 7, 2026. It is a sodium fast breeder reactor. Indian prime minister Modi was present for initial core loading in March 2024.

=== Under construction ===
- CFR-600, China's 600 MWe Experimental Fast Reactor (CEFR) (experimental) and CFR‑600 (under construction at Xiapu / Fu’an) — CFR‑600 intended as a commercial‑scale fast reactor design if completed.
- MBIR Multipurpose fast neutron research reactor. The Research Institute of Atomic Reactors (NIIAR) site at Dimitrovgrad in the Ulyanovsk region of western Russia, 150 MWt. Construction started in 2016 with completion scheduled for 2027.
- BREST-300, Seversk, Russia. Construction started at 8 June 2021

=== In design ===
- BN-1200, another, higher-power, addition to Beloyarsk Nuclear Power Station near Yekaterinburg, Russia. Its construction is expected to start in 2027.
- Toshiba 4S was planned to be shipped to Galena, Alaska (USA) but progress stalled (see Galena Nuclear Power Plant)
- KALIME is a 600 MWe project in South Korea, projected for 2030. KALIMER is a continuation of the sodium-cooled, metal-fueled, fast-neutron reactor in a pool represented by the Advanced Burner Reactor (2006), S-PRISM (1998-present), Integral Fast Reactor (1984-1994), and EBR-II (1965-1995).
- Generation IV reactor (helium·sodium·lead cooled) US-proposed international effort, after 2030.
- JSFR, Japan, a project for a 1500 MWe reactor began in 1998, but without success.
- ASTRID, France, canceled project for a 600 MWe sodium-cooled reactor.
- Mars Atmospherically Cooled Reactor (MACR) is a 1 MWe project, planned to complete in 2033. MACR is a gas-cooled (carbon dioxide coolant) fast-neutron reactor intended to provide power to proposed Mars colonies.
- Elysium Industries is designing a fast spectrum molten salt reactor.
- ALFRED (Advanced Lead Fast Reactor European Demonstrator) is a lead cooled fast reactor demonstrator designed by Ansaldo Energia from Italy, it represents the last stage of the ELSY and LEADER projects.
- Aurora nuclear reactor, Idaho

=== Planned ===
- Future FBR, India, 600 MWe, after 2025. FBTR (Fast Breeder Test Reactor, experimental) and the Prototype Fast Breeder Reactor (PFBR, 500 MWe) at Kalpakkam — PFBR has been in late commissioning phases.

=== Charts ===
Fast reactors
| | U.S. | Russia | Europe | Asia |
|---|---|---|---|---|
| Past | Clementine, EBR-I/II, SEFOR, FFTF | BN-350 | Dounreay, Rapsodie, Superphénix, Phénix (stopped in 2010) | |
| Cancelled | Clinch River, IFR | | SNR-300, ASTRID | |
| Under decommissioning | | | | Monju |
| Operating | | IBR-2, BOR-60, BN-600, BN-800 | | FBTR, CEFR |
| Under repair | | | | Jōyō |
| Under construction | | MBIR, BREST-300 | | PFBR, CFR-600 |
| Planned | Gen IV (Gas·sodium·lead·salt), TerraPower, Elysium MCSFR, DoE VTR | BN-1200 | Moltex, ALFRED | 4S, JSFR, KALIMER |

| Reactor | Country | Type | Approx. electrical output | Status (mid‑2024) |
|---|---|---|---|---|
| Table — operating fast‑neutron reactors in October, 2025 | | | | |
| Beloyarsk Unit 3 (BN‑600) | Russia | Sodium‑cooled fast reactor | ~600 MWe | Operational, commercial |
| Beloyarsk Unit 4 (BN‑800) | Russia | Sodium‑cooled fast reactor | ~800 MWe | Operational, commercial |
| CFR‑600 (Xiapu/Fu’an project) | China | Sodium‑cooled fast reactor (commercial design) | ~600 MWe (design) | Under construction / development |
| China Experimental Fast Reactor (CEFR) | China | Experimental sodium‑cooled fast reactor | Research scale | Experimental / research operations |
| Prototype Fast Breeder Reactor (PFBR) — Kalpakkam | India | Sodium‑cooled fast breeder reactor | 500 MWe (design) | Advanced commissioning / pre‑commercial testing (delayed) |
| Fast Breeder Test Reactor (FBTR) — Kalpakkam | India | Experimental fast breeder | Research scale | Experimental / research operations |
| Jōyō | Japan | Experimental sodium‑cooled fast reactor | Research scale | Experimental / research operations |
| Phénix / Superphénix | France | Sodium‑cooled fast reactors | Phénix ~250 MWe; Superphénix ~1,200 MWe | Decommissioned |

International Atomic Energy Agency. (n.d.). PRIS — Power Reactor Information System. International Atomic Energy Agency. https://pris.iaea.org/PRIS/home.aspx

World Nuclear Association. (n.d.). Fast neutron reactors. World Nuclear Association. https://www.world-nuclear.org/information-library/current-and-future-generation/fast-neutron-reactors.aspx

Rosatom State Atomic Energy Corporation. (n.d.). Beloyarsk nuclear power plant (BN‑600 / BN‑800). Rosatom. https://rosatom.ru/en/production/facilities/beloyarsk-npp/

Nuclear Power Corporation of India Ltd. (NPCIL). (n.d.). Prototype Fast Breeder Reactor (PFBR). https://www.npcil.nic.in/content/pfbr.aspx

Japan Atomic Energy Agency. (n.d.). Jōyō experimental fast reactor. https://www.jaea.go.jp/english/04/joyo.html Notes and guidance

IAEA PRIS is the primary authoritative database for reactor operational status, commissioning dates, and unit details; search by plant/unit name for up‑to‑date status.

World Nuclear Association provides regularly updated overviews and is useful for summaries of international fast reactor programs (China, India, Russia, historical European projects).

National operator/agency pages (Rosatom, NPCIL, JAEA, CNNC/CGN) provide project‑level news and technical summaries; cross‑check with IAEA PRIS for official operational classifications.

== See also ==
- Energy amplifier
- Fast breeder reactor
- Gas-cooled fast reactor
- Generation IV reactor
- Lead-cooled fast reactor
- Nuclear fuel cycle
- Sodium-cooled fast reactor
- Thermal-neutron reactor
