= B&W mPower =

Proposed small modular reactor

The B&W mPower was a proposed small modular reactor designed by Babcock & Wilcox, and to be built by Generation mPower LLC, a joint venture of Babcock & Wilcox and Bechtel. It was a Generation III+ integral pressurized water reactor (light water reactor) concept.

In March 2017, Bechtel withdrew from the joint venture and the project was terminated.

== History ==
The reactor was unveiled by Babcock & Wilcox in June 2009. In July 2010, Babcock & Wilcox announced a formal alliance with Bechtel called Generation mPower LLC. At the same time, Babcock & Wilcox announced that it would build a test facility for the mPower reactor design at the Center for Advanced Engineering and Research in Bedford County, Virginia. In April 2011, Babcock & Wilcox received a $5 million grant from the Virginia Tobacco Indemnification and Community Revitalisation Commission for this test facility.

In June 2011 Generation mPower signed a letter of intent with the Tennessee Valley Authority for constructing up to six reactors at Clinch River Breeder Reactor site in Tennessee.

Generation mPower planned to apply to the Nuclear Regulatory Commission for design certification by 2013. Babcock & Wilcox announced on February 20, 2013, that they had contracted with the Tennessee Valley Authority to apply for permits to build an mPower small modular reactor at TVA's Clinch River site in Oak Ridge, Tennessee.

In November 2012, mPower won a US Department of Energy funding competition for new Small modular reactor (SMR) designs. The competition was intended to accelerate development of SMRs. The award was funded at $79 million in 2013, from a total of $150 million over five years, with a possibility of total government grants reaching $226 million or more.

In 2013 Babcock & Wilcox had intended to sell a majority stake in the mPower joint venture, but in February 2014 announced it was unable to find a buyer.

In February 2014, Jim Ferland, B&W's CEO, announced that spending on the mPower reactor development will be decreased by 75%. The official explanation was that the company had failed in its effort to find additional major investors to participate in the project.

In April 2014, Babcock & Wilcox announced it was scaling back investment in the programme, projecting investment of up to $15 million annually. It stated:

"Without the ability to secure significant additional investors or customer engineering, procurement and construction contracts to provide the financial support necessary to develop and deploy mPower reactors, the current development pace will be slowed."

In March 2017 Bechtel withdrew from the joint venture, citing the inability to find a utility company that would provide a site for a first reactor and an investor. The development project was terminated, with Babcock & Wilcox paying Bechtel a $30 million settlement.

== Design ==
B&W mPower was a Generation III+ integral pressurized water reactor (light water reactor) with a modular design. The reactor and steam generator would be located in a single integrated reactor vessel located in an underground containment facility that would store all of the spent fuel. The modular unit had a diameter of 4.5 metres (15 ft) and it was 23 metres (75 ft) high. The reactor core was 2 by 2 metres (6 ft 7 in by 6 ft 7 in). The steam generator was similar to Once Through Steam Generators (OTSG) used in existing B&W plants (i.e. Three Mile island). The unit had an air-cooled condenser giving 31% thermal efficiency, and passive safety systems.

The reactor was planned to have a rated electrical output of 125–180 MWe. When originally announced, the reactor had planned capacity of 125 MWe. Later the power was increased to 160 MWe and then to 180 MWe. In its pre-application design certification interaction with the Nuclear Regulatory Commission, the reactor's rated capacity was described as 500MWt of thermal power and 160 MWe of electrical power.

The reactor was designed for an expected lifetime of 60 years.

== Fuel and refueling ==
B&W mPower uses standard fuel enriched to 5%, similar to the fuel loaded in the other PWRs. It was designed for a 4-year refueling cycle. In the process of refuelling, the entire core will be completely removed in a single evolution, and replaced in a second separate evolution, making the core nearly "plug and play", unlike traditional reactors, which require fuel handling and movement of individual fuel rods during a refueling outage. The entire used core, once removed, can be placed in storage in the spent fuel pool next to the IRV in the containment, which was designed to hold an entire 60 years worth of used fuel, and was accessible by the containment gantry crane located above the IRV within the containment.

== Thermal hydraulics ==
The mPower incorporates several features of the boiling water reactor (BWR). Like a BWR, the mPower reactor's primary coolant/moderator was highly purified water (with no boric acid). The Reactor Water Cleanup System ensures that primary system water remains pure. Similar to the ABWR, the mPower reactor had integral coolant recirculation pumps inside the Integral Reactor Vessel (IRV). The mPower reactor control rods are inserted from the top of the core and inserted upon scram under gravity. All of the primary coolants were in the liquid phase during normal operation.

The integral once-through steam generator was an advanced derivative of the steam generators used in older B&W designs (Davis Besse). Control rod drives do not penetrate the IRV, as in the light water reactors of today, but are instead wholly enclosed within the IRV. Burnable neutron absorbers within the fuel and control rod inventory are used to suppress hot excess reactivity. Cold shut-down was accomplished with control rod insertion (as in BWRs).

The mPower was designed to produce superheated steam and would not require steam separators and dryers before admitting steam into the high-pressure turbine.

== Safety ==
The mPower was designed to eliminate the potential loss of coolant accidents as the integral reactor vessel would not have a large cold or hot leg piping; it contains the entire primary coolant loop within the reactor pressure vessel with automatic primary loop depressurization. If secondary cooling was lost, creating an effective loss of standard heat removal, there are water supplies located above and within the containment that can cool the vessel with gravity-driven cooling. Heat removal can be used if these systems are exhausted, such as by flooding the containment and establishing natural circulation, as no electrically driven pumps are required.

== See also ==
- Hyperion Power Module
- NuScale
- Toshiba 4S
