= BOR-60 =

Russian fast neutron research reactor

- Reactor concept: Fast-neutron reactor
- Status: Expected to shutdown in 2025
- Location: Dimitrovgrad, Russia, Russia

Main parameters of the reactor core
- Fuel (fissile material): MOX (UO_{2}-PuO_{2})
- Neutron energy spectrum: Fast
- Primary coolant: Sodium

Reactor usage
- Power (thermal): 60 MW
- Power (electric): 12 MW

The BOR-60 is an operational Russian research sodium-cooled fast reactor designed to test nuclear fuels, structural materials and coolants, as well as scientific experiments under fast neutron irradiation.

== History ==
The BOR-60 reactor was constructed to perform tests for the commercial BN-350, BN-600 and BN-800 reactors, which also use fast neutron breeding. Construction began in 1964, and it reached first criticality in 1968. It was commissioned the following year, in 1969.

Originally it used highly enriched uranium, but in 1981 it switched over to burning MOX fuel containing weapons-grade plutonium from decommissioned nuclear warheads.

BOR-60 was intended to be decommissioned in 2010, but was prolonged until 2025, after which the MBIR will replace it.

In 2025 a new technology is being developed for processing of radioactive liquid sodium for proper decommissioning of fast neutron reactors such as BOR-60 and BN-350 (in future it can be used when BN-600 and BN-800 reach the end of life).

== Reactor design ==
The BOR-60 reactor is designed to operate on a mixed-oxide MOX fuel, based on UO_{2} (highly enriched uranium, 45%-90% ^{235}U) and PuO_{2}. The reactor is mainly constructed out of stainless steel.

=== Core ===
Diagram of the reactor core of the BOR-60 experimental fast-neutron reactor. (Note that the fuel and blanket assemblies can be easily interchanged) Grey: fuel assemblies White: blank assemblies Blue: experimental material assemblies Green: experimental fuel assemblies Red: control rods Yellow: experimentation channels

The core is made up of a hexagonal grid containing 265 separate elements, with fuel channels, control rods, various experimental assemblies and an outer section of solid blanket assemblies (blanks). The reactor vessel also has several experimentation channels in the outer hull, with widths varying from 90 mm to 230 mm.

=== Coolant ===
The reactor is a sodium-cooled fast reactor, which uses liquid sodium as the coolant. It uses two separate sodium loops, and these are connected to a main water-cooled loop which feeds the steam generators and turbines for producing electricity. The sodium coolant is pressurized to 5.5 MPa, and is heated to over 500 °C in the reactor.

== Capabilities ==
BOR-60 allows for wide-scale tests of fuels, materials, coolants and detectors for various fast reactors. It is capable or burning a wide range of fuels, including weapons-grade material, as well as various metallic, oxide, nitride and carbide variations. Thus it has been used to test fuels and reactor physics for a wide array of reactors, such as the BN-350, BN-600 and BN-800, as well as the MBIR and proposed BREST-300 lead-cooled reactors.

== See also ==
- MBIR - multi-loop research reactor intends to replace BOR-60. In construction since 2015, est. completion in 2027.
- BN-800 reactor - generation IV sodium-cooled fast breeder reactor, operational since 2016
- BREST-300 - generation IV lead-cooled fast reactor, in construction since 2020
- Versatile Test Reactor - a similar US project, the funding was canceled in 2022
