= International Centre for Low Dose Radiation Research =

Research center at the University of Ottawa

The International Centre for Low Dose Radiation Research (ICLDRR) was established at the University of Ottawa, in 1997, with national and international support. The ICLDRR assembles all published data and conducts analyses concerning the effects of low doses of radiation on humans and in the environment. ICLDRR's main focus is to contribute to clarifying whether low and very low doses of ionizing radiation increase the risk of cancer. To that end, the ICLDRR has assembled and analysed virtually all published data on cancer induction in laboratory animals by low doses of ionizing radiation, and published initial findings at specialized international conferences, since 1998.

The foremost contribution of the ICLDRR is the setup of a radiation low-dose mammal-experiment database. Their results have been used in support of the radiation hormesis hypothesis, wherein low-dose radiation may actually be beneficial for health. They were quoted in a famous report by the French Academies as evidence that this effect takes place in 40% of low-dose animal experiments.

The work at ICLDRR is funded by several actors of the nuclear industry such as the United States Department of Energy, Électricité de France, Cogema Resources, Inc. (Canada) or the Central Research Institute of the Electric Power Industry (Japan).
