= ALFRED (nuclear reactor) =

Planned lead-cooled reactor demonstrator

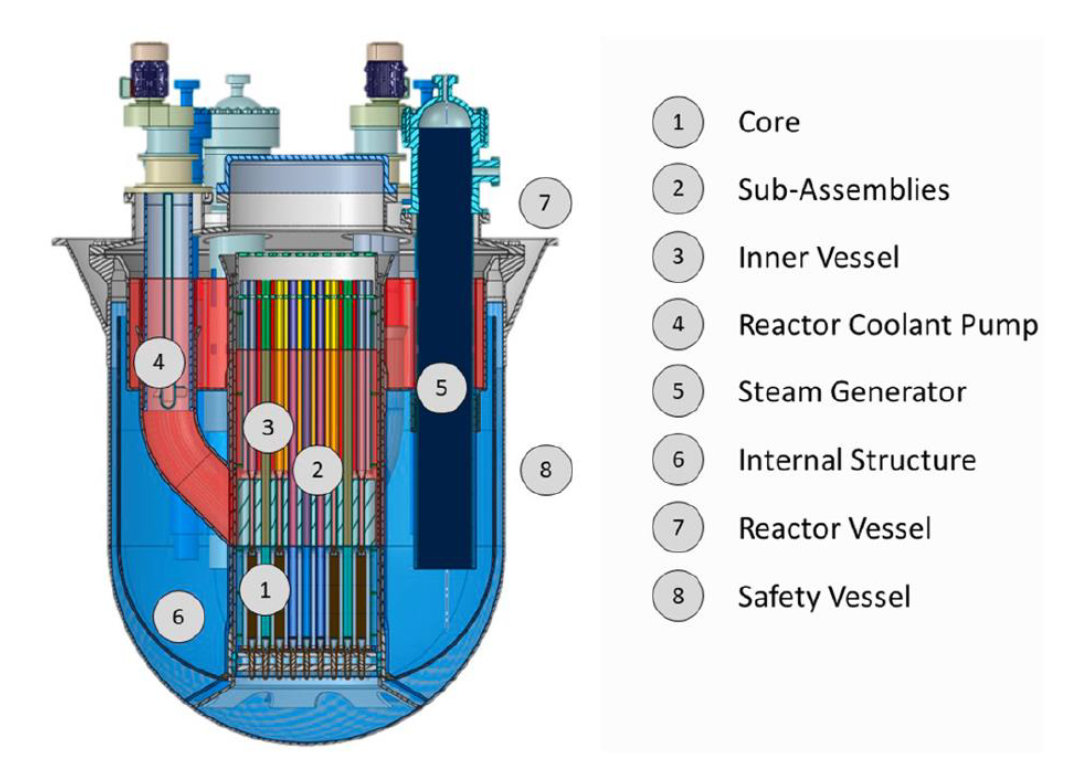
- ALFRED IV Gen. Nuclear Reactor by Ansaldo Energia (Italy)
- Country: Italy (design and construction) and Romania (destination)
- Location: Mioveni
- Status: Planned
- Construction cost: EUR 1.0 billion
- Operator: ICN

Nuclear power station
- Reactor type: Lead-cooled fast reactor

Power generation
- Units planned: 1
- Nameplate capacity: 125 MW

ALFRED (Advanced Lead-cooled Fast Reactor European Demonstrator) is a planned lead-cooled fast reactor. Designed by Ansaldo Energia from Italy, it represents the last stage of the ELSY and LEADER projects.

== Construction ==
ALFRED will be built in the Romanian town of Mioveni near Pitesti.

== Technical data ==
- Thermal power: 300 MW
- Electrical power: 125 MW
- Spectrum: Fast
- Coolant: Lead
- Average lead coolant temperature: 520 °C (968 °F) on entry in the steam generator; 390 °C (734 °F) on exit of the steam generator.
- Fuel: MOX or Uranium (20%)

== See also ==
- Fast breeder reactor
- Fast neutron reactor
- Generation IV reactor
