= Omega West Reactor =

Coordinates: 35.876476°N 106.291294°W

The Omega West Reactor (OWR) was an experimental nuclear reactor located at Los Alamos National Laboratory in Los Alamos NM. OWR was completed in 1956 and primarily used for scientific scale nuclear research until it was fully decommissioned in 1994. It operated 24 hours a day, five days a week until 1972, when it went to eight hours a day, five days a week operation. The original purpose of the reactor was to collect nuclear material properties in support of the United States nuclear weapons program. Other uses included production of useful medical isotopes. The reactor was capable of producing an external beam of neutrons via beam tubes which extended through the reactor shielding. These were provided for external neutron beam experiments including: neutron radiography, neutron capture studies, gamma ray studies, neutron cross section measurements and neutron activation studies.

The reactor's low-pressure design and tall vertical vessel made it possible for a lead glass window to be installed at the top, through which the active core could be viewed directly.

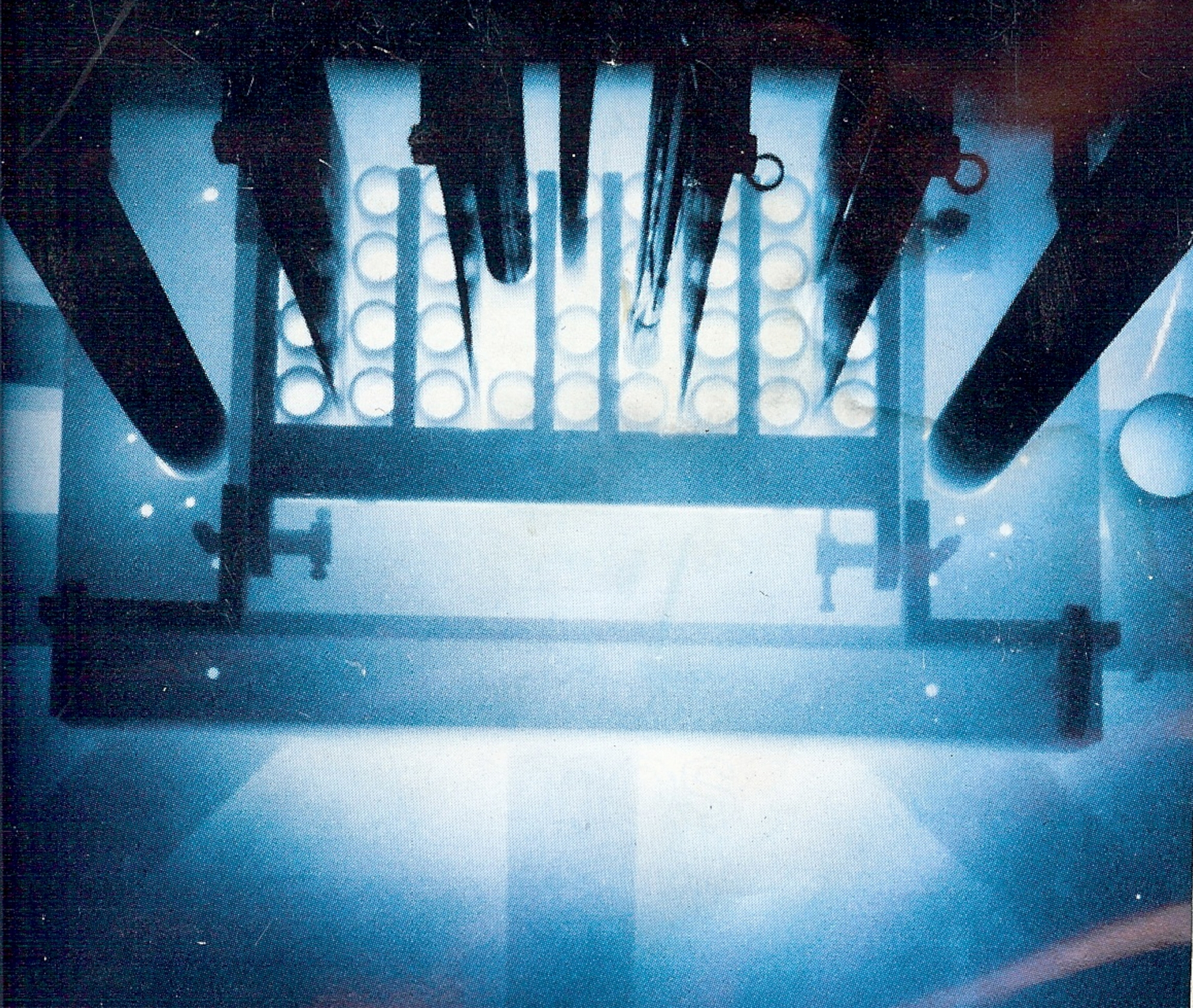
The active core of the Omega West Reactor.

Very few production nuclear reactors were ever designed with viewing windows. The blue glow seen in the picture is characteristic of Cherenkov radiation.

== Core design ==
The core consisted of an aluminum grid with 54 vertical channels arranged in 6 rows by 9 channels wide. The channels could be used for fuel rods, experiments and additional uses. An additional 8 channels were used for control rods. The core was contained in a cylindrical stainless steel tank 2.4 meters in diameter and 7.3 meters tall. The core was surrounded by a heavy concrete shield which also served as a secondary containment vessel. One of the configurations of the reactor had a 2.5-inch-thick (64 mm) lead gamma ray shield installed in the first row and 4-inch-thick (100 mm) beryllium blocks installed in row 6. This left rows 2 through 5 for installation of fuel and experimental usage. A typical core loading consisted of 33 fuel elements, each containing 236 grams of 93% enriched Uranium (when new).

Cooling and moderation was provided by ordinary (light) water which transferred heat out of the core to the air via cooling towers. The reactor could be operated at low power in natural convection mode. At full power the flowrate through the core was 13,250 liters/minute.

== Shutdown ==
The reactor operated successfully until 1992 when an unplanned power spike caused an automatic shutdown. During the shut down an investigation revealed a tritium contaminated cooling water leak at which time the Department of Energy had the fuel rods removed and placed the reactor in permanent safe shut down mode and scheduled for decontamination and decommissioning. The OWR was fully decommissioned in 1994 and demolished in 2003. The demolition project was completed under budget and ahead of schedule.

== Specifications ==
The reactor met the following specifications:

- Reactor Vessel - Tank type
- Core Design - 54 fuel rods (maximum)
- Fuel - Highly Enriched Uranium up to 93%
- Coolant - Light Water
- Moderator - Light Water
- Control Rods - 8ea. Borated Stainless Steel
- Maximum power level - 8 megawatts thermal.

== See also ==
- UHTREX
- Clementine
