= Central Research Institute of Electric Power Industry =

Research center in Japan

The Central Research Institute of Electric Power Industry (CRIEPI; 電力中央研究所) is a Japanese non-profit foundation that conducts research and development of technologies in a variety of scientific and technical fields related to the electric power industry.

Also, CRIEPI researches many aspects of social matters through subordinate laboratories. CRIEPI not only engages in research and education in Japan, but also provides education, training and technology transfer worldwide.

It is similar to the U.S. EPRI, though its energy research extends into areas that could be considered to be in the domain of the USDOE's national laboratories in the United States, such as research and design of fission reactor concepts.

In 2004, CRIEPI developed a U.S. presence due to the proposed Galena Nuclear Power Plant in Galena, Alaska, that is proposed to use an advanced reactor design – the Toshiba 4S – developed by Toshiba Corporation and CRIEPI.

== See also ==
- Energy law
