= UHTREX =

American Ultra-High Temperature Reactor Experiment (1959–1971)

The Ultra-High Temperature Reactor Experiment (UHTREX) was an experimental gas-cooled nuclear reactor run at Los Alamos National Laboratory between 1959 and 1971 as part of research into reducing the cost of nuclear power. Its purpose was to test and compare the advantages of using a simple fuel against the disadvantages of a contaminated cooling loop. It first achieved full power in 1969.

The experiment was a spin-off from Project Rover, intended to develop a nuclear thermal rocket.

== Reactor core design ==
The UHTREX core was composed of a vertical hollow rotating cylinder (turret) constructed of solid graphite.

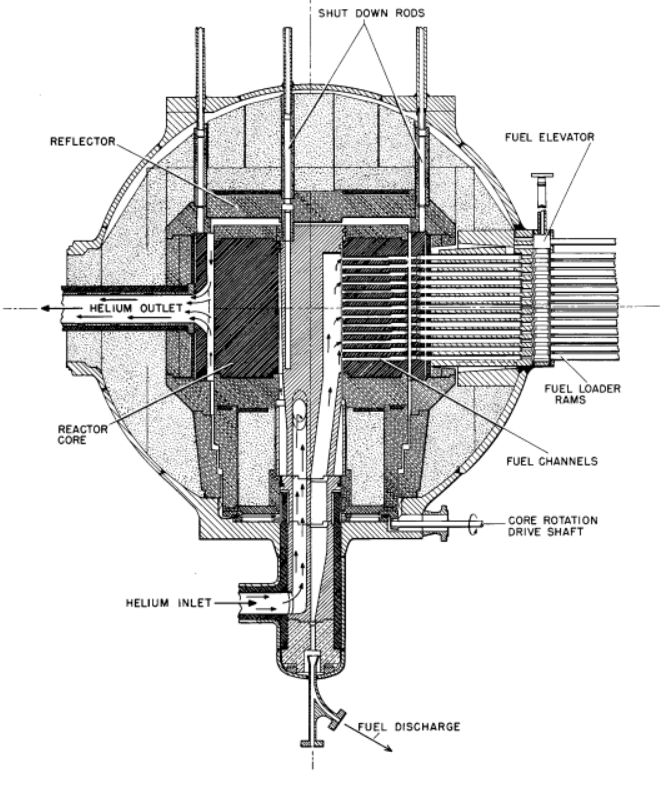
UHTREX Reactor Core Vertical Cross Section 1

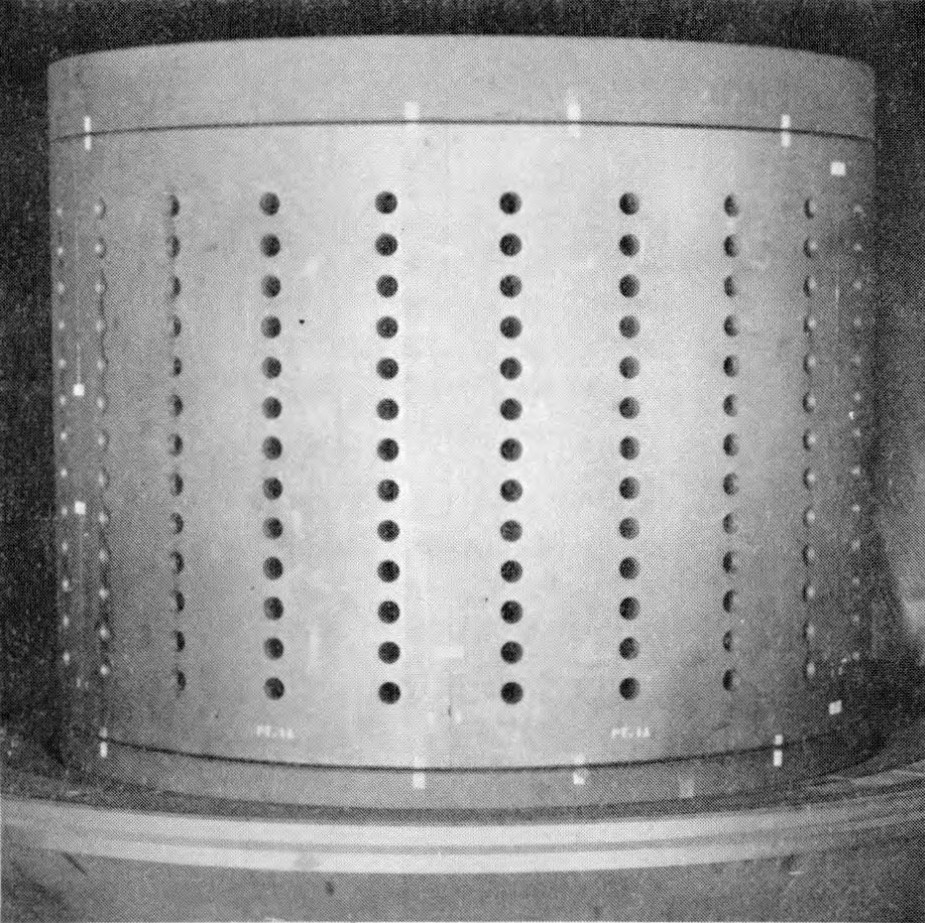
The pure graphite neutron moderator of the Ultra-high temperature reactor experiment (UHTREX)

The cylinder was 70 in. OD x 23 in. ID x 39 in. high. The core had 312 fuel channels. The channels were equally spaced radially around the core at 15 degree intervals arranged in 13 separate layers of 24 channels each. Each channel held up to 4 fuel elements and extended completely through to the inside of the cylinder. The core could be refueled remotely while at full power. Refueling involved rotating the core to the channel containing the element requiring replacement and pushing in a new element. The used element would be pushed out into the center and fall to the base of the reactor to be collected. At full power the reactor used up 1 to 6 fuel elements per day depending on enrichment and porosity of the fuel element. It produced 3MW of thermal energy.

== Advantages ==
A typical nuclear reactor prevents the coolant medium from directly contacting the fuel pellets either by cladding the fuel pellets, sealing the fuel pellets inside a fuel rod or running the coolant through separate piping. This prevents contamination of the cooling medium. One of the disadvantages of a sealed fuel assembly includes buildup of fission products inside the fuel element. Some of these products poison the reaction ultimately leading to poor efficiency well before a significant portion of the fuel is used up. At this time the reactor requires re-fueling. Keeping the fuel and coolant separate can present significant design challenges as well. For example, the metal tubing required to do so cannot be operated at temperatures above its melting point which is generally significantly lower than the fuel pellet. This lowers the maximum theoretical thermal efficiency of the reactor.

The UHTREX used un-clad porous carbon extruded fuel elements each shaped like a long hollow cylinder. The fuel elements were manufactured by vacuum impregnating the porous carbon cylinders with aqueous uranyl nitrate solution then air drying and baking them in a furnace ultimately producing a uranium oxide coating tightly held in a porous graphite matrix. This fuel was expected to be substantially less expensive to manufacture than other types of fuel at the time. The primary advantages of this type of fuel was that the porosity of the pellet in addition to the high temperatures achievable would allow most of the poisons created by the fission products to migrate out of the fuel. The poisons would then be carried away by the coolant stream for eventual filtering out and removal. This allows a higher percentage of fuel to be burned up before the pellet needed replacement (up to 50%).

== Disadvantages ==
The major disadvantage to porous reactor fuel is that the entire primary cooling loop including all the pumps, compressors and heat exchangers would become highly contaminated with fission products. The high contamination level precludes being able to open the reactor vessel for the eventual refuelling. Therefore, the reactor was designed for remote online refuelling. The potential for wider contamination from a coolant leak would pose a significant danger to personnel and the environment.

== Specifications ==
UHTREX had following specifications:

- Fuel - highly enriched uranium
- Rated power - 3 MW (thermal)
- Core construction material - graphite
- Moderator - graphite
- Reactor vessel - carbon steel sphere 13 ft. 2 in. diameter 1.75 inches thickness.
- Fuel channels - 312 channels. Each one is 1.1 in. ID, 23.5 in. long and holds up to 4 fuel elements.
- Fuel element - 1 in. OD, 0.5 in. ID and 5.5 in. long (25.4 mm x 12.7 mm x 139.7 mm).
- Core power density - 1.3 W/cc
- Fuel utilization - up to 50%.
- Coolant - helium at 500 psi (3.45 MPa)
- Coolant temperature - inlet 1600 °F, Outlet 2400 °F (871 °C and 1316 °C).
- Coolant flow rate - 10,250 pounds per hour (1.294 kg/s)

where ID and OD are the inner and outer diameter, respectively.

== See also ==
- Omega West Reactor
- Clementine reactor
