= Clementine (nuclear reactor) =

World's first continuous fast-neutron reactor

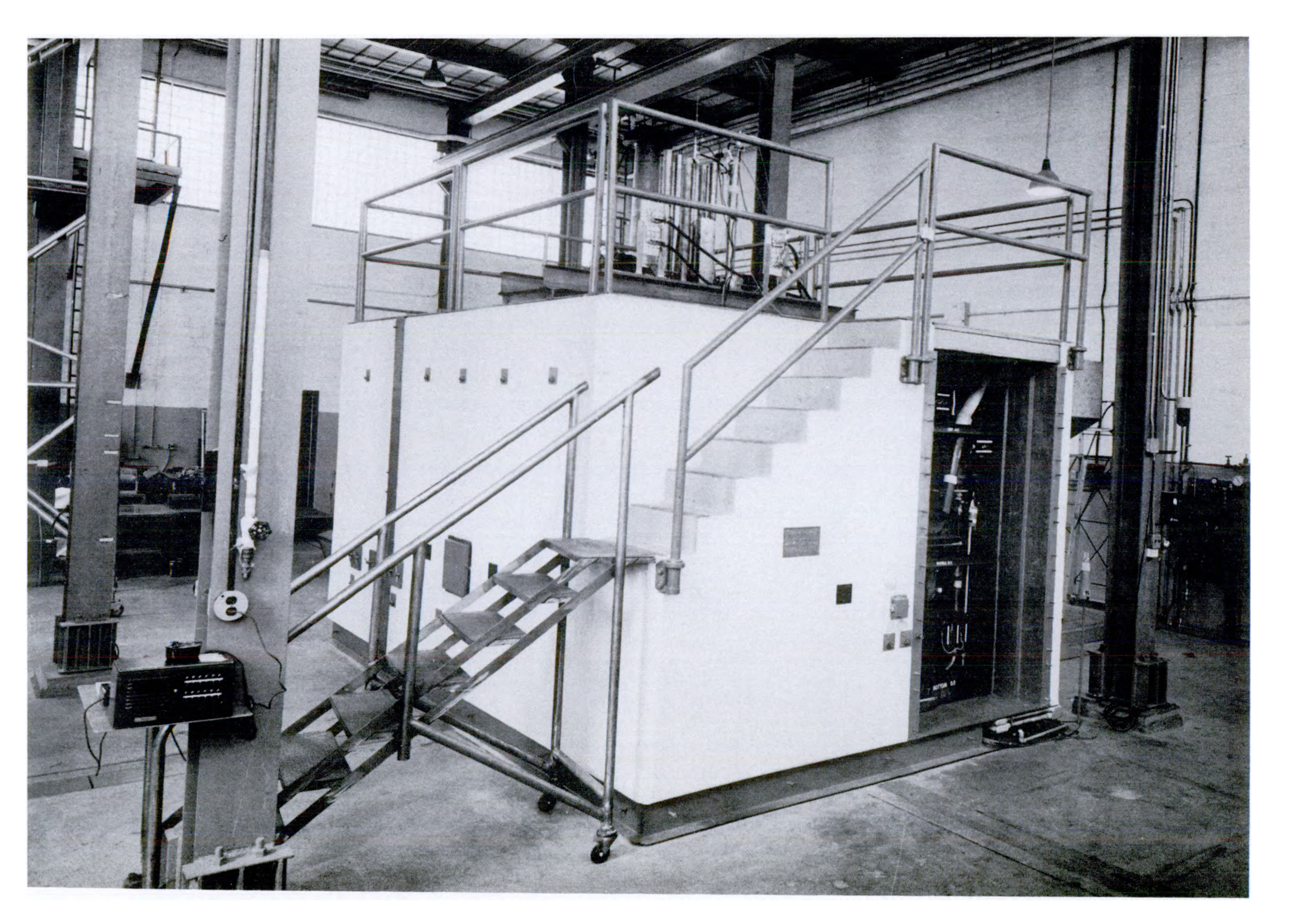
Exterior of Clementine

Clementine was the code name for the world's first continuous (Note: Los Alamos' Dragon critical assembly, operated from January 1945, was the first fast-spectrum reactor, but was a crude setup only designed for bursts of criticality) fast-neutron reactor, also known as the Los Alamos fast plutonium reactor. It was an experimental-scale reactor. The maximum output was 25 kW and was fueled by plutonium and cooled by liquid mercury. Clementine was located at Los Alamos National Laboratory, at Omega Site TA-2 in Los Alamos, New Mexico. Clementine was designed and built in 1945–1946 and first achieved criticality in 1946 and full power in March 1949. The reactor was named after the song "Oh My Darling, Clementine." The similarities to the song were that the reactor was located in a deep canyon and the reactor operators were 49'ers, as 49 (last digits of element 94, isotope 239) was one of the code names for plutonium at the time.

The primary goal of Clementine was to determine nuclear properties of materials for nuclear weapons research after the Manhattan Project. A number of other experiments were performed at the reactor, including investigation of the feasibility of civilian breeder reactors, and measuring neutron cross sections of various materials.

== Core design ==
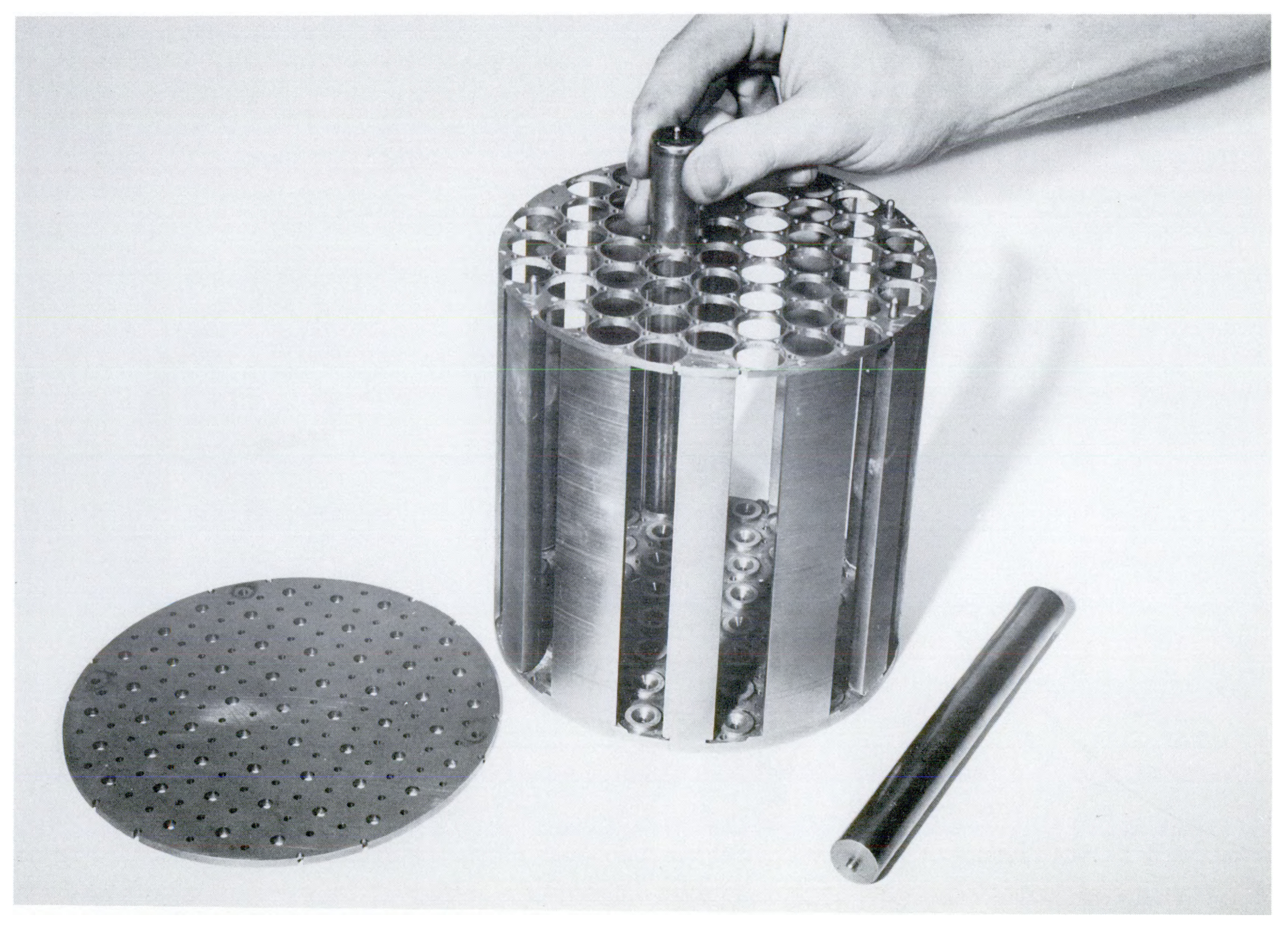
The fuel rod cage for the core of Clementine

The core was contained in a 117 cm (46 in) long mild steel cylinder that had an inside diameter of 15.2 cm (6.0 in) and a wall 0.6 cm (0.24 in) thick. The fuel assembly was 15 cm (5.9 in) in diameter 14 cm (5.5 in) tall and contained 55 fuel elements. Each fuel element was composed of δ-phase plutonium-239. They were each 1.64 cm (0.65 in) diameter and 14 cm (5.5 in) long. The fuel elements were clad in 0.5 millimetres (0.020 in) thick plain carbon steel. The core was located at the bottom of the steel cylinder.

The core was cooled by liquid mercury. The maximum thermal output was 25 kW. The mercury was circulated through the core and out to a mercury-water heat exchanger at a maximum flow rate of 0.15 litres per second (0.040 USgal/s) by an induction type electromagnetic pump with no moving parts.

== Shielding and support structure ==
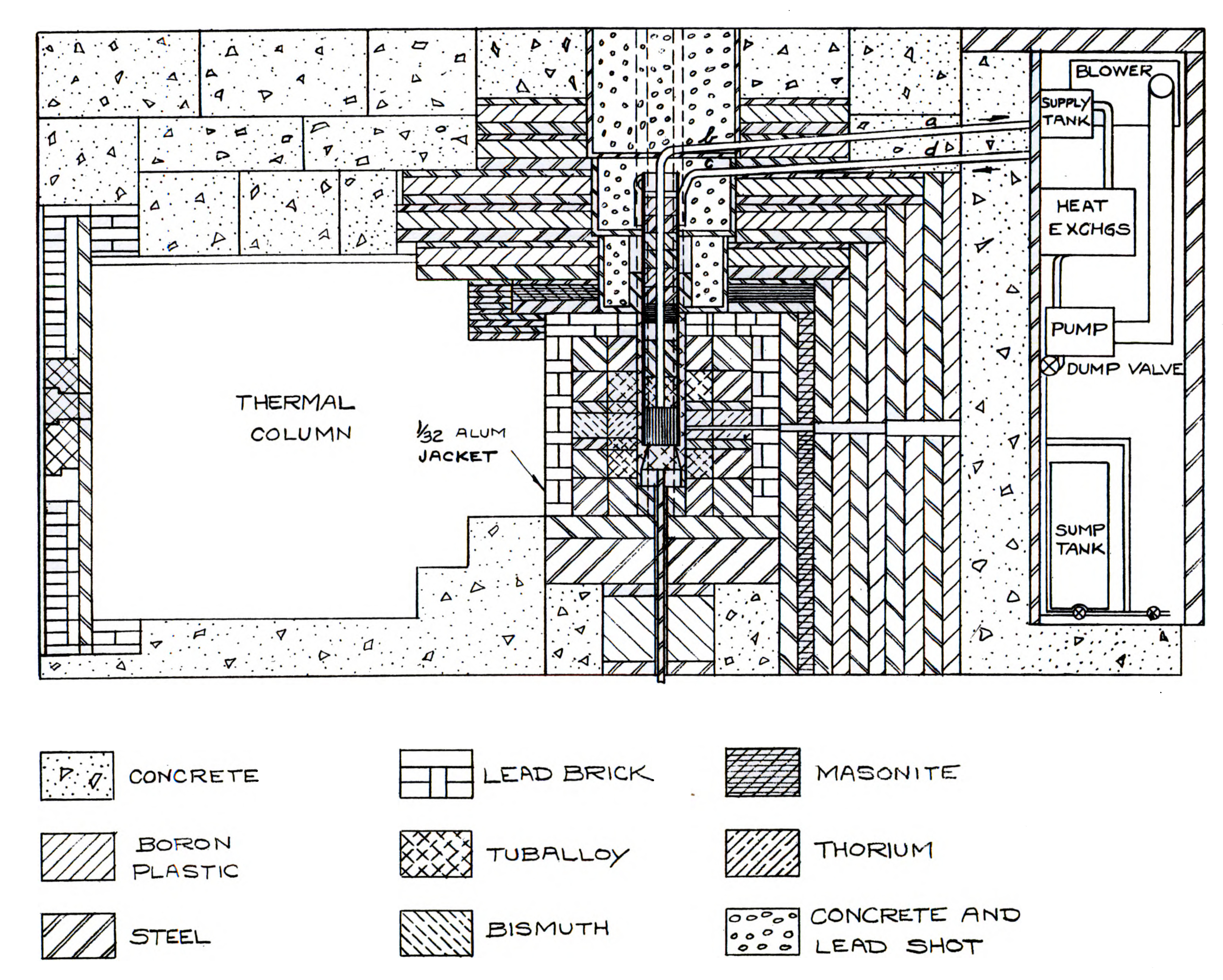
Cross section diagram through Clementine

The reactor core was wrapped in a series of neutron reflectors and shielding structures, starting with a 15 cm (6 in.) thick cylindrical blanket of natural uranium immediately surrounding the core. This blanket was open at the top and bottom and could be moved up and down. Next was a 15.2 cm (6 in.) thick steel reflector and 10 cm (4 in.) of lead. Finally, most of the reactor was surrounded by multiple laminations of steel and boron plastic. This entire assembly was surrounded and supported by a thick concrete shell that provided additional shielding. A number of holes ran through the shielding to provide fast neutrons to the various physics experiments.

== Reactor control ==
The reactor was the first reactor to demonstrate reaction control via control of delayed neutrons, this was more of a function of being one of the very early reactors, rather than a special design feature. Control was accomplished by several means. The uranium blanket described above could be raised and lowered. ^{238}U is a good neutron reflector, so the position of the blanket controlled the number of neutrons available to the reaction. When the blanket was raised, more neutrons were reflected back into the core, causing a greater number of fissions and, consequently, greater power output.

Additionally, there were two shutdown/control rods composed of natural uranium and boron that was enriched in the boron-10 isotope. ^{10}B is a very effective neutron poison that could be inserted to control and shut down the reaction.

Shutdown of the reactor involved simultaneously dropping the uranium blanket and inserting the two control rods into the center which absorbed neutrons and poisoned the reaction. Up to 20 other holes were available in the core for experimental configurations or additional control or fuel rods.

== Use and shutdown ==
Clementine operated successfully from 1946 until 1950 when the reactor was shut down to correct a problem with the control and shim rods. During this shutdown it was noted that one of the natural uranium rods had ruptured. It was replaced and the reactor was restarted.

It was again operated successfully until 1952 when the cladding on one of the fuel rods ruptured. This caused contamination of the primary cooling loop with plutonium and other fission products. At this time it was decided that all the primary objectives of Clementine had been achieved and the reactor was permanently shut down and dismantled.

== Results of the Clementine experiment ==
The experience and data provided by operating the Clementine reactor were very useful for both military and civilian applications. One of the notable achievements of the Clementine project included measurements for the total neutron cross sections of 41 elements to a 10% accuracy. Additionally, Clementine provided invaluable experience in the control and design of fast neutron reactors. It was also determined that mercury was not an ideal cooling medium for this type of reactor due to its poor heat transfer characteristics.

== Specifications ==
- Type: fast neutron reactor
- Fuel: plutonium-239
- Coolant: mercury at 2 kilograms per second (260 lb/min) maximum.
- Moderator: none
- Shielding: multiple layers of uranium-238, steel, lead and boron-impregnated plastic.
- Power: 25 kW maximum.
- Core temperature: inlet 38 °C (100 °F), outlet 121 °C (250 °F), max core 135 °C (275 °F)

== See also ==
- Omega West Reactor (OWR)
- UHTREX
- Liquid metal cooled reactor
