= Toshiba 4S =

Nuclear reactor design

The Toshiba 4S (Super Safe, Small and Simple) is a micro sodium-cooled nuclear fission reactor design.

== General description ==
Cross-sectional image of the 4S design

The plant design is developed by a partnership that includes Toshiba and the Central Research Institute of Electric Power Industry (CRIEPI) of Japan.

The technical specifications of the 4S reactor are unique in the nuclear industry. The actual reactor would be located in a sealed, cylindrical vault 30 m (98 ft) underground, while the building above ground would be 22×16×11 m (72×52.5×36 ft) in size. Two 4S reactor systems have been designed, one with an electrical output of 10 MW and a 30-years non-refueling core, and one with an electrical output of 50 MW with a 10-years-between-refuelings core.

The 4S is a fast neutron sodium reactor. It uses neutron reflector panels around the perimeter to maintain neutron density. These reflector panels replace complicated control rods, yet keep the ability to shut down the nuclear reaction in case of an emergency. Additionally, the Toshiba 4S utilizes liquid sodium as a coolant, with a boiling point of 883C, allowing the reactor to operate at higher temperature and without the additional chamber pressurization that's necessary to run a water-cooled reactor, thereby improving safety and efficiency.

The Toshiba 4S Nuclear Battery was proposed as the power source for the Galena Nuclear Power Plant in Alaska, but the project was abandoned in 2011 and Toshiba did not proceed with an application for certification of the design.

== Criticism ==
A research team including Allison Macfarlane and Rodney C. Ewing evaluated waste production of a number of small nuclear reactors, including the 4s, and published their findings in Proceedings of the National Academy of Sciences of the United States of America. They found that small modular reactors produce more radioactive waste than conventional reactors. These claims were contested by NuScale Power.

== See also ==
- CAREM
- NuScale
- Hyperion nuclear reactor (hydride)
- mPower by Babcock & Wilcox Company
- Traveling wave reactor
