= Fast Flux Test Facility =

Deactivated nuclear test reactor in US

Coordinates: 46.435284°N 119.360061°W

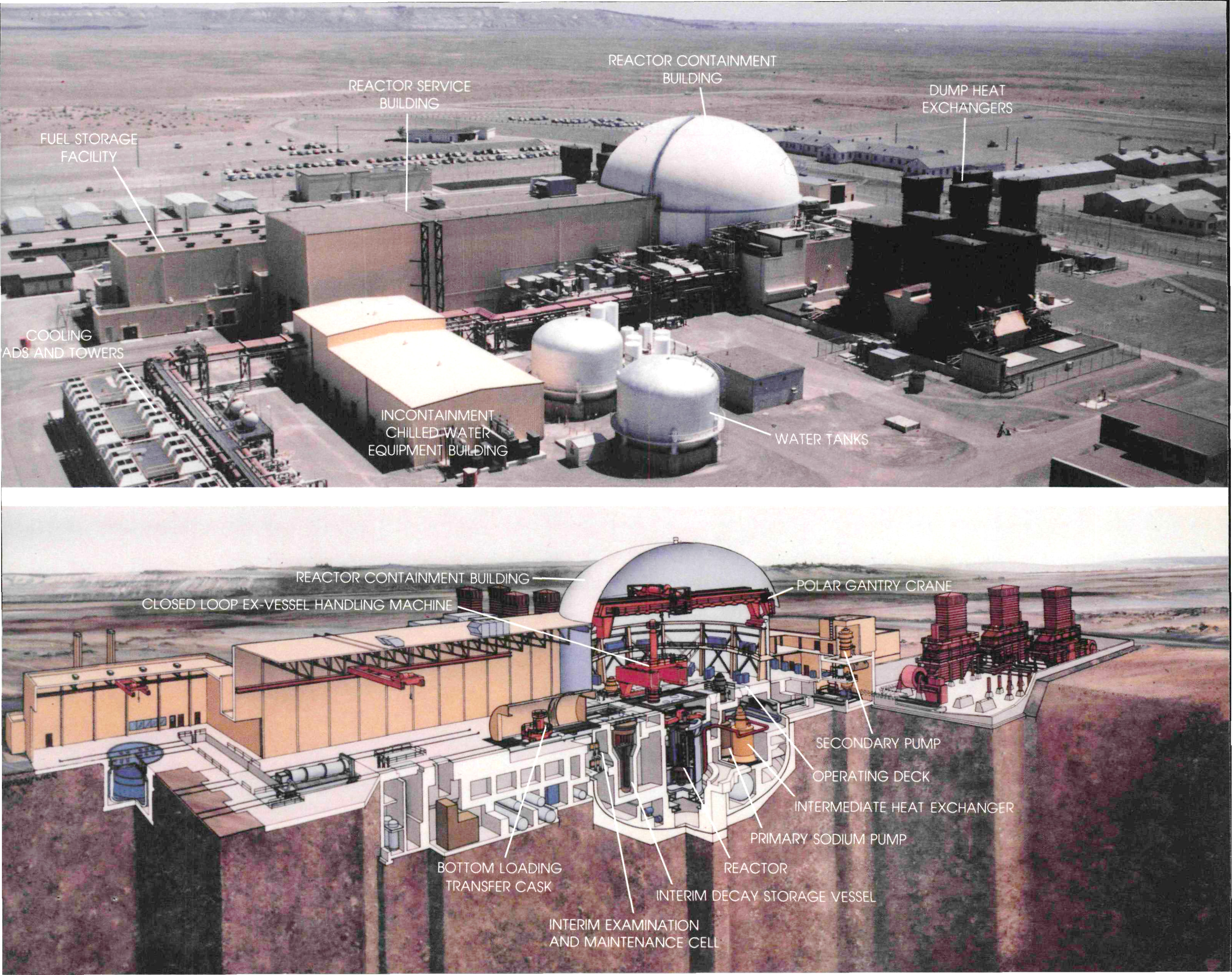
The Fast Flux Test Facility with labels

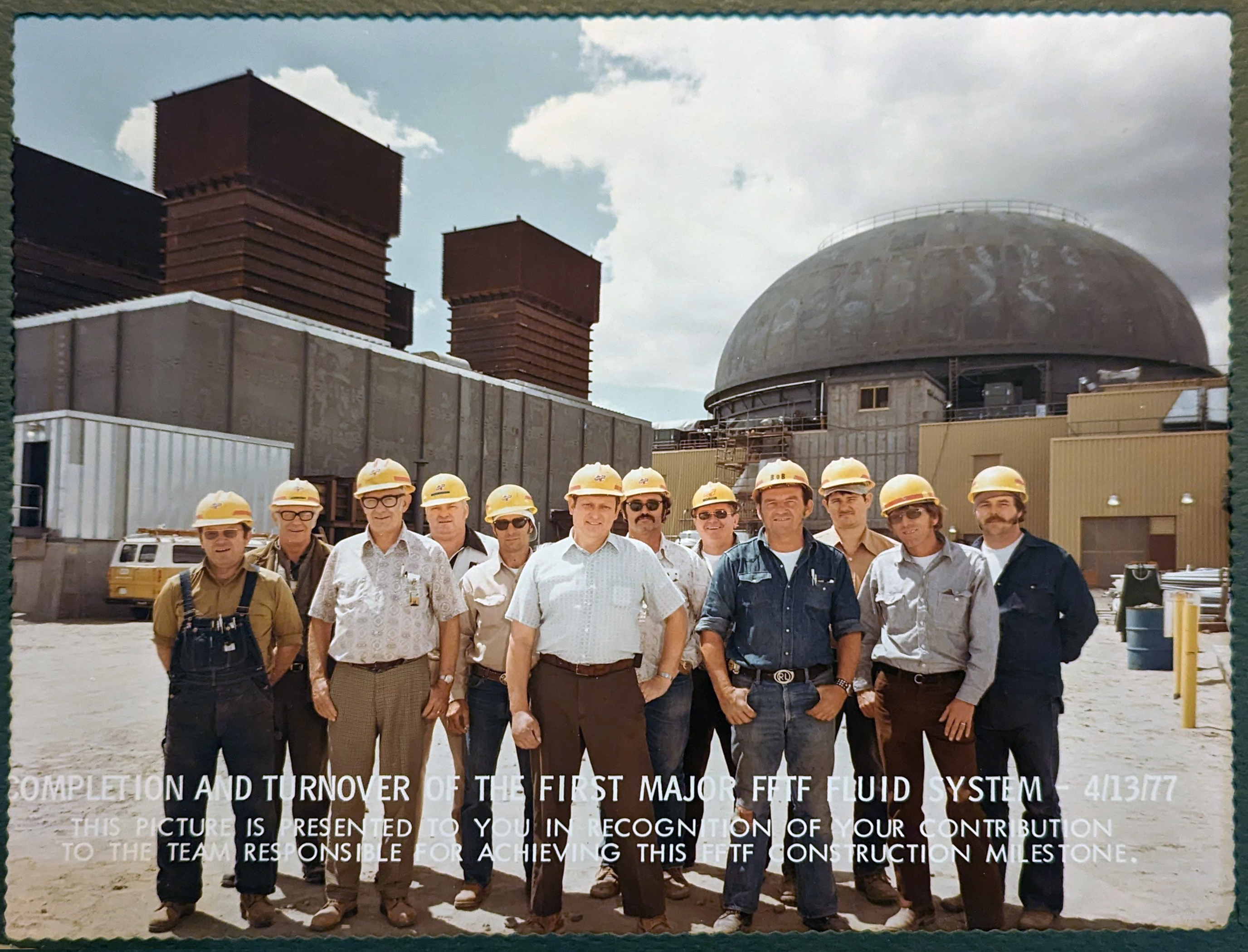
Commemorative photo marking the completion of the FFTF system

The Fast Flux Test Facility (FFTF) is a 400 MW thermal, liquid sodium cooled, nuclear test reactor owned by the U.S. Department of Energy. It does not generate electricity. It is situated in the 400 Area of the Hanford Site, which is located in the state of Washington.

== History ==
The construction of the FFTF was completed in 1978, and the first reaction took place in 1980. From April 1982 to April 1992 it operated as a national research facility to test various aspects of commercial reactor design and operation, especially relating to breeder reactors. The FFTF is not a breeder reactor itself, but rather a sodium-cooled fast neutron reactor, as the name suggests.

It is stated on the site dedicated to the FFTF, that it tested "advanced nuclear fuels, materials, components, nuclear power plant operations and maintenance protocols, and reactor safety designs."

By 1993, the number of uses to which the reactor could be put was diminishing, so the decision was taken in December of that year to deactivate it. Over the next three years, the active parts of the facility were gradually halted, fuel rods removed and stored in above-ground dry storage vessels. However, in January 1997, the DOE ordered that the reactor be maintained in a standby condition, pending a decision as to whether to incorporate it into the US Government's tritium production program, for both medical and fusion research.

Since then, due to legal wrangling, decommissioning has been stopped and restarted at intervals. In December 2001, the deactivation was continued, after the DOE found that it was not needed for tritium production. Work was halted in 2002 when court action was begun. As of May 2003, deactivation has continued, and it is currently in a state of cold standby.

In May 2005 the core support basket was drilled to drain the remaining sodium coolant, which effectively made the reactor unusable. However, a technical study is being pursued with regard to repairing the reactor. As the coolant was drained, the system was filled with high purity argon gas to prevent corrosion. The support basket is an unpressurized area, and the reactor core has not yet been breached (as of June 2006).

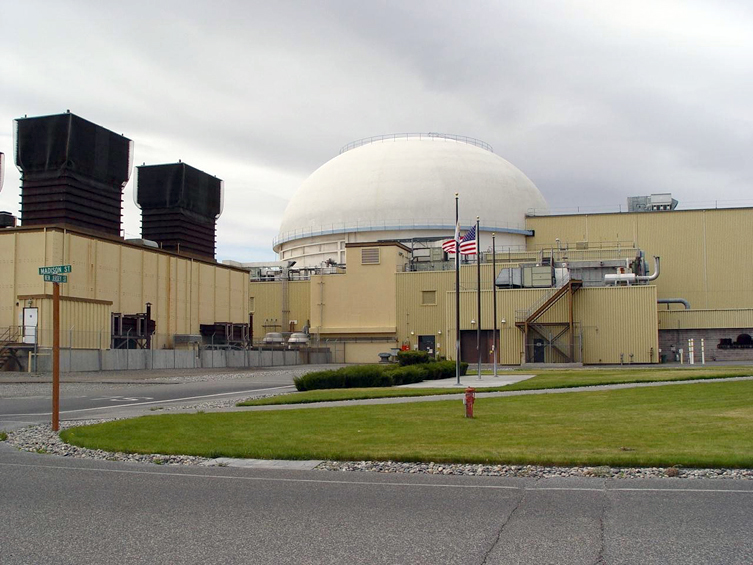
Frontal view of the Fast Flux Test Facility

The reason for renewed interest in the FFTF is that the global atmosphere with regard to nuclear energy has changed, and the US is pursuing nuclear power once again. To build a similar facility would cost an estimated $2–5 billion.

In April, 2006, the FFTF was honored by the American Nuclear Society as a "National Nuclear Historic Landmark". Achievements cited include:

- Radiation exposure to operators was 1/100 of commercial power reactors.
- Established a world record for fuel performance.
- Produced extremely high quality rare radioisotopes for medicine and industry.
- Conducted the first passive safety testing.
- Demonstrated commercial viability of breeder reactor components, materials and fuels.
- Provided fundamental experimental data for fusion programs.
- Advanced the fuels and materials development for space nuclear power.
- Demonstrated miniaturized reactor test techniques.
- Demonstrated the feasibility of transmuting radioactive technetium-99 into a non-radioactive element using a reactor. Technetium-99 is one of the most troublesome long-lived components of the nuclear waste stream. Processing out this isotope and destroying it, permanently reduces the risks associated with long term storage.

The probable successor to the FFTF will be the Versatile Test Reactor, which will roughly have the same size and capabilities as future test reactor and which will be built at Idaho National Laboratory in Idaho or Oak Ridge National Laboratory in Tennessee in the 2020s.
