= SEFOR =

Former research reactor in Arkansas, US

Southwest Experimental Fast Oxide Reactor
- SEFOR before its demolition in 2019
- Reactor concept: Sodium-cooled fast reactor
- Status: Demolished
- Location: Strickler, Arkansas, US
- Coordinates: 35°50′1″N 94°16′53″W

Main parameters of the reactor core
- Fuel (fissile material): Pu-U MOX
- Fuel state: Solid (pellets)
- Neutron energy spectrum: Fast
- Primary control method: Movable reflectors
- Primary coolant: Liquid sodium

Reactor usage
- Primary use: Fuel element testing
- Power (thermal): 20 MW_{th}
- Criticality (date): 1969

The Southwest Experimental Fast Oxide Reactor (SEFOR) was an experimental sodium-cooled fast reactor located in Strickler, Arkansas, United States, approximately 18 miles (29 km) southwest of Fayetteville. It operated from 1969 to 1972, when its experimental program ended. It was then acquired by the University of Arkansas in 1975, in the hope that it could be used as a research facility.

SEFOR was a 20 MW_{th} reactor, generating heat but not electricity. It was fueled with mixed-oxide fuel, and was funded by the US Atomic Energy Commission to test whether Doppler broadening would stabilize the core during an accident. The predicted effect was confirmed, and results from SEFOR were used in later fast breeder reactor designs.

The reactor was privately operated by General Electric and funded by the United States government through the Southwest Atomic Energy Associates, a nonprofit consortium composed of 17 utilities of the Southwest Power Pool and several European nuclear agencies. A proposal for funding to extend SEFOR's operation to 1977 was rejected prior to its closure in 1972. The fuel and irradiated sodium coolant were removed and taken offsite later in 1972, and the facility was placed in safe storage. The reactor was acquired by the University of Arkansas in 1975, and was used to calibrate equipment and as a research tool. SEFOR was designated a Nuclear Historic Landmark site in October 1986, and that same year the university stopped using the facility but continued to maintain surveillance through maintenance activities and periodic visits to the reactor. The university maintained the decommissioned site until receiving federal funds to remediate the facility to greenfield status in 2016, which was completed in 2019.

== Design ==
Early concepts for fast breeder reactors used metallic nuclear fuel. In the early 1960s, work began on the use of ceramic mixed oxide (MOX) fuels using oxides of uranium and plutonium. It was believed that Doppler broadening would create a prompt negative temperature coefficient of reactivity in oxide fuel. The coefficient of reactivity determines how a reactor behaves as it becomes hotter. A negative coefficient means the nuclear chain reaction slows as the temperature increases. Doppler broadening is the effect of increasing temperature on the neutron capture resonances of uranium-238 in the fuel. As the fuel heats up, broadening increases parasitic neutron capture and slows the chain reaction. Because the reactivity decreases with increasing temperature, the Doppler effect is considered a very important safety feature. Several theoretical studies and critical assembly experiments predicted the magnitude of the effect; however, those small-scale experiments could not confirm whether the Doppler effect could be relied on as a safety feature in fast reactors. The US Atomic Energy Commission (AEC) ordered SEFOR's construction to measure the effect of Doppler broadening on reactivity, and to determine how effective the Doppler effect would be as a safety feature.

SEFOR was a 20 MW_{th} fast-spectrum reactor, fueled with mixed PuO_{2}-UO_{2}, and cooled with liquid sodium. The reactor generated heat, but no electricity. Its core was designed to replicate the conditions of a large sodium-cooled fast reactor. Its fuel pellets were 0.88 inches in diameter, around four times that of typical fast reactor fuel pellets. The large diameter ensured pellet centers would reach similar temperatures to a large, high-power reactor. SEFOR's core was approximately 90 cm tall and wide, and surrounded by a nickel neutron reflector. It also used movable reflectors as control elements. The reflectors allowed SEFOR to operate with comparatively little fissile material; its fuel pellets contained around 10% fissile plutonium, similar to a commercial reactor. While expected to operate at a steady state power level below 20 MW_{th}, SEFOR was designed to accommodate large reactivity spikes up to several gigawatts. The reactor site consisted of the sodium-cooled test reactor, shop building, operations building, maintenance shed, and transformer yard. The operations building also contained beds and showers for the plant workers.

SEFOR was designed to confirm that the Doppler effect would, as predicted, shut the reactor down during a power spike. It was also intended to obtain data on fuel behavior and performance, particularly the Doppler coefficient of reactivity close to the fuel's melting point. Because the fuel temperature coefficient of reactivity is also dependent on thermal expansion of the fuel rods, SEFOR's fuel was specially designed with a gap in the middle of each fuel pin. The gap prevented increased neutron leakage from changing the reaction rate. Due to its small size, SEFOR used electromagnetic pumps for its cooling system.

== Construction and operation ==
SEFOR (background), 1971

General Electric (GE) was contracted to design and operate the reactor, while Nuclear Fuel Services (NFS) was contracted to fabricate the fuel rods from plutonium supplied by the AEC. Other participants in the project included the Karlsruhe Institute of Technology, Euratom, and Southwest Atomic Energy Associates, which was a consortium of 17 utilities. The AEC supplied NFS with 545 kg of plutonium from the Hanford Site, in the form of plutonium nitrate solution. This was converted into oxide and mixed with depleted uranium oxide to form mixed-oxide fuel pellets. Each pellet contained around 10% fuel-grade plutonium. The reactor was located in Strickler, Arkansas, approximately 18 miles (29 km) southwest of Fayetteville. SEFOR was constructed between 1965 and 1968, on time and within budget, and achieved criticality in 1969. It operated between 1969 and 1972, when it was shut down and defueled.

The core for SEFOR was originally mocked-up using the ZPR-III reactor. SEFOR used two different cores during its operation period. The first used beryllium oxide (BeO) pins in each fuel assembly to moderate the fast neutrons slightly and increase the magnitude of the Doppler effect. The use of BeO rods allowed SEFOR to replicate the "softened" neutron spectrum of a large oxide-fueled fast reactor. The second core replaced the BeO with stainless steel for a "harder" neutron spectrum, to gather data as well for medium-sized, metal-fueled reactor. Multiple tests to measure the Doppler effect were performed, and the experimental results agreed with predictions. In certain tests, severe reactivity transients were created by rapidly ejecting a boron carbide control rod from the reactor. Tests at SEFOR occurred at up to 20 MW_{th} of steady-state power, as well as super-prompt critical transients where peak power reached 10 GW. In all tests, the Doppler feedback shut down the reaction as predicted. The experimental measurements of the Doppler coefficient agreed well with the theoretical predictions.

The SEFOR program demonstrated that Doppler feedback was smooth and could be predicted accurately. The tests proved that the Doppler broadening effect, in a fast oxide-fueled reactor, could arrest a prompt supercritical transient, and was an important safety feature. The data obtained from SEFOR was later used in the safety analysis of large fast breeder reactors. Although the SEFOR program was considered highly successful, the experiments determining the temperature dependence of the Doppler coefficient were inadequate and could not provide meaningful data.

== Closure ==
SEFOR's original test plan lasted until 1972, however GE hoped to keep SEFOR operating until 1977. Continued operations were contingent on a large subsidy from the AEC which was not approved. The reactor was decommissioned immediately following the completion of its test program.

The reactor was partially dismantled and placed in safe storage. The reactor's spent fuel, consisting of 850 fuel rods, was shipped by truck to the Hanford Site. The fuel was either reprocessed there or at the Savannah River Site; no plutonium is believed to have remained at the site after the removal of the spent fuel. The reactor's sodium coolant was shipped to the Nevada Low-Level Radioactive Waste Site near Beatty, Nevada. Activated components were placed within the reactor vessel, fuel storage tank, and refueling cell, which were then welded shut.

Following reactor shutdown, GE and Southwest Atomic Energy Associates fought a legal battle with the county government to avoid paying $66,000 in taxes on the facility. The Arkansas Supreme Court erased the tax bill, ruling that the plant was of no value. The reactor was given to the University of Arkansas (UA) as a tax-deductible gift. At the time, the university faculty hoped to use the reactor to train future nuclear engineers, and planned to set up research laboratories inside the building. However, the hiatus of the domestic nuclear energy industry meant that, after 1986 it was never again used for nuclear research.

The reactor was officially declared deactivated in 1974, and the UA took possession of the facility the following year. The university used it for research and instrument calibration. The facility was used to house ^{252}Cf spontaneous fission neutron sources supplied by the Savannah River National Laboratory (SRNL). One of these was the largest source of its type ever encapsulated at SRNL. Among the research results obtained was a measurement of the nuclear cross section for the reaction ^{93}Nb(n, n')^{93m}Nb, important in reactor pressure vessel surveillance. University use ended in 1986, after which the UA served as a caretaker for the facility while awaiting funding for site remediation. The American Nuclear Society designated SEFOR a Nuclear Historic Landmark in October 1986. The UA maintained surveillance of the site, and an on-site caretaker lived in the Visitor's Center. By 2005, the university spent approximately $50,000 per year maintaining and monitoring the site. The dean of the UA graduate school characterized it as a white elephant, stating, "We were silly enough to accept it".

== Dismantlement ==
The remaining reactor site remained contaminated with residual sodium coolant, polychlorinated biphenyls, lead, and asbestos. Arkansas senator Blanche Lincoln worked since 1999 to secure funds for the remediation of SEFOR. In 2005 she introduced legislation to decommission the site, as part of the Energy Policy Act of 2005. Although the bill authorized $16 million to the Department of Energy for remediation, a specific appropriation was not made.

In 2008, Lincoln requested federal funding to start the dismantlement process as part of the Omnibus Appropriations Act. The University of Arkansas received $1.9 million by the US Department of Energy for a cleanup "characterization study".

In September 2016, the UA was awarded $10.5 million by the Department of Energy to dismantle and remediate SEFOR. The university expected the process to take about a year and a half, and that the site would be returned to greenfield status. EnergySolutions, a global nuclear waste management company from Salt Lake City, was contracted to assist with dismantling the reactor.

On January 19, 2017, the University of Arkansas conducted a public tour of the SEFOR site before it was dismantled. The tour was attended by over 400 people. The demolition of the site was carried out in three phases, starting with the characterization study completed in 2011. The second phase, comprising the removal of equipment and material from the reactor building, was completed in September 2017. In April 2017, the DOE announced an additional $10 million in funding for the final phase, consisting of demolishing the containment and reactor buildings. The reactor vessel, weighing 84,000 lbs, was removed by crane and placed in a carbon steel containment vessel on October 16, 2018. The entire procedure took about 18 minutes. The vessel was then filled with grout, welded shut, and shipped to the Nevada National Security Site for disposal. On April 18, 2019, EnergySolutions announced the cleanup project was completed at a community meeting at the Strickler Fire Department Community Center, and was awaiting a final approval from the Arkansas Department of Environmental Quality, the Arkansas Department of Health and the US Department of Energy. The cleanup of SEFOR was completed in May 2019.
