= Integral reactor =

Nuclear reactor design principle

In the nuclear power field, an integral reactor is a nuclear reactor design principle where the reactor core, primary cooling loop, steam generators and any required emergency cooling are contained within a single reactor vessel. The concept can be applied to any sort of underlying reactor design, there are examples of integral pressurized water reactors, sodium-cooled fast reactors, and others. The main goals are mass production of the reactor, as the entire working design can be delivered as a single unit and then connected to the non-nuclear generation sections of the overall power plant. Integral reactors are also often deliberately small, allowing passive cooling in emergencies.
