= Galena Nuclear Power Plant =

Proposed nuclear power plant in Galena, Alaska

Coordinates: 64°44′26″N 156°53′8″W

The Galena Nuclear Power Plant was a proposed nuclear power plant to be constructed in the Yukon River village of Galena, Alaska. If it had been built in the projected timeframe, it would have been the first non-military nuclear power plant built in Alaska to be utilized for public utility generation.

In April 2008, Marvin Yoder, a consultant on the project, said that Toshiba was planning to make the application to the Nuclear Regulatory Commission in 2009, and that if approval had been given in 2010 or 2011, the reactor could have been operational by 2012 or 2013. The company was also developing a 50 megawatt (electric) version of the reactor.

The plan had been to build a 10-megawatt Toshiba 4S reactor that would have been buried underground, and fuel would have powered the reactor for 30 years. According to Dennis Witmer, an energy consultant with the Center for Energy and Power at the University of Alaska Fairbanks, the project was "effectively stalled." Toshiba never began the expensive process for approval that is required by the U.S. Nuclear Regulatory Commission.
