= BREST (reactor) =

Lead-cooled reactor family designed in Russia

The BREST (Russian: БРЕСТ, Быстрый Реактор Естественной безопасности со Свинцовым Теплоносителем, Bystryy Reaktor Yestestvennoy bezopasnosti so Svintsovym Teplonositelem, 'Naturally Safe Lead-Cooled Fast Reactor') is a generation IV lead-cooled fast nuclear reactor. BREST-300 model is under construction since 2021 in Seversk.

The main characteristics of the BREST reactor are passive safety and a closed fuel cycle. The reactor uses nitride uranium-plutonium fuel, is a breeder reactor and can burn long-term radioactive waste. Lead is chosen as a coolant for being high-boiling, radiation-resistant, low-activated and at atmospheric pressure.

== Breeder concepts ==
In a traditional nuclear reactor design, the fuel is only able to reach criticality when the neutrons produced in the fission reactions are slowed down using a "neutron moderator". The most common neutron moderator is water, although other concepts have been used by some designs. The resulting moderated neutrons no longer have enough energy to cause fission in the ^{238}U that makes up the majority of natural uranium, and even with a moderator, natural uranium is generally not able to maintain a chain reaction. Instead, the fuel is enriched to increase the amount of ^{235}U, which increases the chance that the moderated neutrons will strike another ^{235}U and maintain the reaction, and well as the removal of more of the ^{238}U which would lower the overall reactivity.

In the typical fast breeder design, the fuel is further enriched to the point where there is enough ^{235}U to keep the reaction going even without a moderator. The result is that some of the neutrons exit the core area with high energy. This is only possible if the core is cooled using a fluid that is not also a moderator, and typically coolants like helium or liquid sodium metal are used for this purpose. The core is then surrounded by a breeding blanket, typically containing depleted uranium of almost entirely ^{238}U. The high-energy neutrons exiting the core cause some of these ^{238}U nuclei to be converted to plutonium ^{239}Pu, which can be separated using chemical processes and fed back into the reactor as fuel. At some point, enough plutonium has been created that no new enriched uranium is needed, and from that point the system can be run on natural uranium ore and the bred plutonium.

In a traditional fast reactor design, a small core operating at higher neutron energies results in a number of issues, related mostly to prompt neutron reactor power excursions which require the addition of more layers of control systems. They have also proven to be uneconomical compared to traditional light water reactors in practice, as the expected high cost of uranium ore never materialized and it is generally cheaper to simply buy new fuel than attempt to breed fuel and then separate it from the highly radioactive used fuel. The high energy neutrons also cause fission in some of the other materials in the blanket, which can be used to convert nuclear waste materials into less dangerous forms. The idea of using fast neutron reactors as "burners" instead of breeders, with the specific role of burning off nuclear waste, has also been raised on many occasions but has not, as of 2025, produced a commercial system.

== BREST concept ==
The BREST design is based on a new core design that addresses some of the issues seen in the earlier designs. In contrast to the earlier solid-core concepts, which were generally designed using traditional fuel rods, BREST is based on the use of fuel encapsulated in heat-conducting nitride elements. The design results in the plutonium breeding taking place entirely inside the core, without the separate blanket section. Lead coolant is used, instead of sodium, both for safety reasons as well as the Soviet practical experience using this coolant in nuclear submarines. The result is an overall neutron economy that is similar to traditional reactors, with the denser fuel and breeding elements reduced into individual fuel elements.

== BREST-300 ==
The construction of the BREST-300-OD (Russian: БРЕСТ-ОД-300 («опытный демонстрационный»), romanized: BREST-OD-300 («opytnyy demonstratsionnyy»), lit. 'BREST-OD-300 ("experimental demonstration")') in Seversk (near Tomsk) was approved in August 2016. Preparatory construction work began in May 2020. Construction started in 8 June 2021.

By the end of 2024, the cooling tower had been built, the walls of the reactor containment building were in place, and the reactor shaft had been installed.

In November 2024, installation work began on the condenser in the turbine hall.

Installation of the turbine and generator was to begin in 2025. The target for operation startup is 2026. The first BREST-300 will be a demonstration unit for the first decade. If successful, the 1200 MWe (2800 MWt) BREST-1200 will follow.

In January 2025, the facility for fabrication of nuclear fuel for BREST-OD-300 started producing prototype fuel assemblies with depleted uranium nitride fuel pellets. It will have around 250 people working in it.

In September 2025 key large parts were delivered to the construction site, such as a metal shell for the central cavity, an internal casing for the core basket, the first shell of the peripheral cavity (there are four such shells in total). It took two months to transport the equipment along rivers and the northern sea route.

=== Technical data ===
- Thermal power: 700 MW
- Electrical power 300 MW
- Average lead coolant temperature: 540 °C (1,004 °F) on entry in the steam generator; 340 °C (644 °F) on exit of the steam generator
- Loop number: 4
- Core height: 1,100 millimetres (43 in)
- Fuel load: 20.6 short tons (18.7 t)
- Fuel campaign: 5 years

== See also ==
- Fast breeder reactor
- Fast neutron reactor
- Generation IV reactor
- Siberian Chemical Combine
