= Nuclear decommissioning =

Process of dismantling a nuclear facility

Nuclear decommissioning is the process leading to the irreversible complete or partial closure of a nuclear facility, usually a nuclear reactor, with the ultimate aim of termination of the operating licence. The process usually runs according to a decommissioning plan, including the whole or partial dismantling and decontamination of the facility, ideally resulting in restoration of the environment to greenfield status. The decommissioning plan is fulfilled when the approved end state of the facility has been reached.

The process typically takes about 15 to 30 years, or many decades more when an interim safe storage period is applied for radioactive decay. Radioactive waste that remains after the decommissioning is either moved to an on-site storage facility where it is still under control of the owner, or moved to a dry cask storage or disposal facility at another location. The final disposal of nuclear waste from past and future decommissioning is a growing, still unsolved, problem.

Decommissioning is an administrative and technical process. The facility is dismantled to the point that it no longer requires measures for radiation protection. This includes clean-up of radioactive materials. Once a facility is fully decommissioned, no radiological danger should persist. The license will be terminated and the site released from regulatory control. The plant licensee is then no longer responsible for the nuclear safety.

The costs of decommissioning are to be covered by funds that are provided for in a decommissioning plan, which is part of the facility's initial authorization. They may be held in a decommissioning fund, which may be structured as a trust fund.

Worldwide, there are hundreds of thousands of small nuclear devices and facilities, for medical, industrial and research purposes, that will have to be decommissioned at some point.

== Definition ==
Nuclear decommissioning is the administrative and technical process leading to the irreversible closure of a nuclear facility such as a nuclear power plant, a research reactor, an isotope production plant, a particle accelerator, or a uranium mine. This will require action to remove all or some of the regulatory controls from the facility, so that the site can be reused. Decommissioning includes planning, decontamination, dismantling and materials management.

Decommissioning is the final step in the lifecycle of a nuclear installation. It involves activities ranging from shutdown and removal of nuclear material to the environmental restoration of the site. The term decommissioning covers all measures carried out after a nuclear installation has been granted a decommissioning licence until nuclear regulatory supervision is no longer necessary. The aim is ideally to restore the natural initial state that existed before the construction of the nuclear power plant, the so-called greenfield status.

Decommissioning includes all steps as described in the decommissioning plan, leading to the release of a nuclear facility from regulatory control. The decommissioning plan is fulfilled when the approved end state of the facility has been reached. Disposal facilities for radioactive waste are closed rather than decommissioned. The use of the term decommissioning implies that no further use of the facility (or any part of it) for its existing purpose is foreseen. Though decommissioning typically includes dismantling of the facility, it is not necessarily part of it as far as existing structures are reused after decommissioning and decontamination.

From the owner's perspective, the ultimate aim of decommissioning is termination of the operating license, once he has shown that the radiation at the site is below the legal limits, which in the US is an annual exposure of 25 millirem in order to release the site to the public for unrestricted use. The site will be dismantled to the point that it no longer requires measures for radiation protection. Once a facility is decommissioned no radioactive danger persists and it can be released from regulatory control.

The complete process usually takes about 20 to 30 years. In the US, the decommissioning must be completed within 60 years of the plant ceasing operations, unless a longer time is necessary to protect public health and safety; up to 50 years are for radioactive decay and 10 years to dismantle the facility.

== Steps in the decommissioning process ==
The decommissioning process encompasses:

Pre-decommissioning

- development of a decommissioning plan
- involvement of the public (in democracies)
- application for a decommissioning license
- permanent shutdown
- removal and disposal of nuclear fuel, coolant(s) and/or moderator

Decommissioning

- dismantling and decontamination
- in the US, a License Termination Plan (LTP) has to be submitted two years prior to (the expected) termination of the plant license.
- restoration of the environment
- termination of the operating license; turn over responsibilities
- monitoring of the site (in case of deferred dismantling/Safstor)
- monitoring and maintenance of the interim storage of spent fuel
- final disposal of radioactive waste

=== Decommissioning plan ===
Under supervision of the IAEA, a member state first develops a decommissioning plan to demonstrate the feasibility of decommissioning and to assure that the associated costs are covered. At the final shutdown, a final decommissioning plan describes in detail how the decommissioning will take place, how the facility will be safely dismantled, ensuring radiation protection of the workers and the public, addressing environmental impacts, managing radioactive and non-radioactive materials, and termination of the regulatory authorization. In the EU, decommissioning operations are overseen by Euratom. Member states are assisted by the European Commission.

The progressive demolition of buildings and removal of radioactive material is potentially occupationally hazardous, expensive, and time-intensive, and presents environmental risks that must be addressed to ensure that radioactive materials are either transported elsewhere for storage or safely stored on site.

=== Disposal of nuclear waste ===
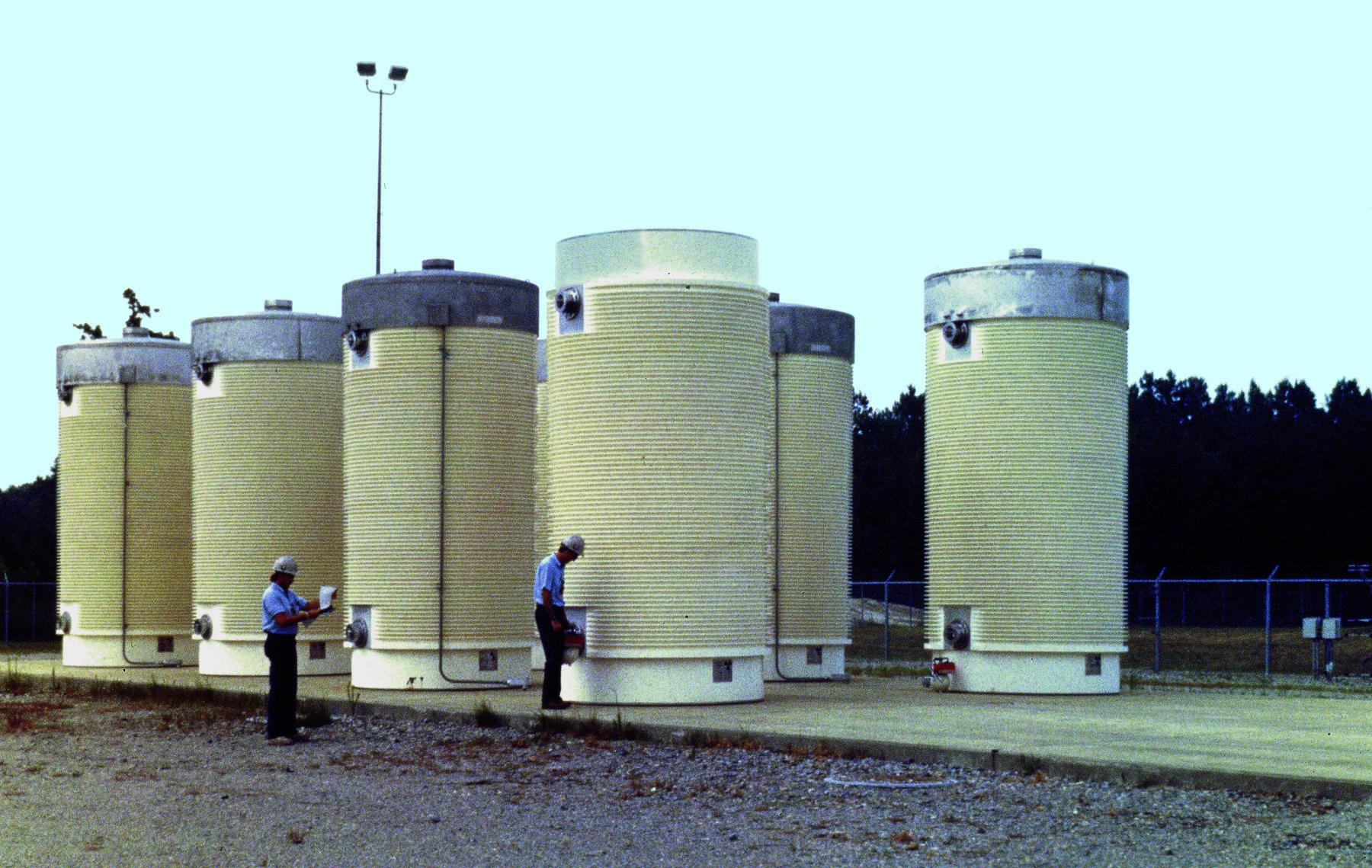
Graphic of a dry storage of spent nuclear fuel

Radioactive waste that remains after the decommissioning is either moved to an on-site storage facility where it still is under control of the plant owner, or moved to a dry cask storage or disposal facility at another location. The problem of long-term disposal of nuclear waste is still unsolved. Pending the availability of geologic repository sites for long-term disposal, interim storage is necessary. As the planned Yucca Mountain nuclear waste repository – like similar sites elsewhere in the world – is controversial, on- or off-site storage in the US usually takes place in Independent Spent Fuel Storage Facilities (ISFSIs).

In the UK, all eleven Magnox reactors are in decommissioning under responsibility of the NDA. The spent fuel was removed and transferred to the Sellafield site in Cumbria for reprocessing. Facilities for "temporary" storage of nuclear waste – mainly 'Intermediate Level Waste' (ILW) – are in the UK called Interim Storage Facilities (ISFs).

=== Environmental impact assessment ===
The decommission of a nuclear reactor can only take place after the appropriate licence has been granted pursuant to the relevant legislation. As part of the licensing procedure, various documents, reports and expert opinions have to be written and delivered to the competent authority, e.g. safety report, technical documents and an environmental impact assessment (EIA). In the European Union these documents are a precondition for granting such a licence is an opinion by the European Commission according to Article 37 of the Euratom Treaty. On the basis of such general data, the Commission must be in a position to assess the exposure of reference groups of the population in the nearest neighbouring states.

== Options ==
There are several options for decommissioning:

Immediate dismantling (DECON in the United States; )
Shortly after the permanent shutdown, the dismantling and/or decontamination of the facility begins. Equipment, structures, systems and components that contain radioactive material are removed and/or decontaminated to a level that permits the ending of regulatory control of the facility and its release, either for unrestricted use or with restrictions on its future use. The operating license is terminated.

Deferred dismantling (SAFSTOR in the United States; "care and maintenance" (C&M) in the UK)
The final decommissioning is postponed for a longer period, usually 30 to 50 years. Often the non-nuclear part of the facility is dismantled and the fuel removed immediately. The radioactive part is maintained and monitored in a condition that allows the radioactivity to decay. Afterwards, the plant is dismantled and the property decontaminated to levels that permit release for unrestricted or restrict use. In the US, the decommissioning must be completed within 60 years. With deferred dismantling, costs are shifted to the future, but this entails the risk of rising expenditures for decades to come and changing rules. Moreover, the site cannot be re-used until the decommissioning is finished, while there are no longer revenues from production.

Partial entombment
The US has introduced the so-called In Situ Decommissioning (ISD) closures. All aboveground structures are dismantled; all remaining belowground structures are entombed by grouting all spaces. Advantages are lower decommissioning costs and safer execution. Disadvantages are main components remaining undismantled and definitively inaccessible. The site has to be monitored indefinitely.

This method was implemented at the Savannah River Site in South Carolina for the closure of the P and R Reactors. With this method, the cost of decommissioning for each reactor was about $73 million. In comparison, the decommissioning of each reactor using traditional methods would have been an estimated $250 million. This resulted in a 71% decrease in cost. Other examples are the Hallam nuclear reactor and the Experimental Breeder Reactor II.

Complete entombment
The facility will not be dismantled. Instead it is entombed and maintained indefinitely, and surveillance is continued until the entombed radioactive waste is decayed to a level permitting termination of the license and unrestricted release of the property. The licensee maintains the license previously issued. This option is likely the only possible one in case of a nuclear disaster where the reactor is destroyed and dismantling is impossible or too dangerous. An example of full entombment is the Chernobyl reactor.

In IAEA terms, entombment is not considered an acceptable strategy for decommissioning a facility following a planned permanent shutdown, except under exceptional circumstances, such as a nuclear disaster. In that case, the structure has to be maintained and surveillance continued until the radioactive material is decayed to a level permitting termination of the licence and unrestricted release of the structure.

== Costs ==
The calculation of the total cost of decommissioning is challenging, as there are large differences between countries regarding inclusion of certain costs, such as on-site storage of fuel and radioactive waste from decommissioning, dismanting of non-radioactive buildings and structures, and transport and (final) disposal of radioactive waste.

Moreover, estimates of future costs of deferred decommissioning are virtually impossible, due to the long period, where inflation and rising costs are unpredictable. Nuclear decommissioning projects are characterized by high and highly variable costs, long schedule and a range of risks. Compared with non-nuclear decommissioning, additional costs are usually related with radiological hazards and safety & security requirements, but also with higher wages for required higher qualified personnel. Benchmarking, comparing projects in different countries, may be useful in estimating the cost of decommissioning. While, for instance, costs for spent fuel and high-level-waste management significantly impacts the budget and schedule of decommissioning projects, it is necessary to clarify which is the starting and the ending point of the decommissioning process.

The effective decommissioning activities begin after all nuclear fuel has been removed from the plant areas that will be decommissioned and these activities form a critical component of pre-decommissioning operations, thus should be factored into the decommissioning plan. The chosen option – immediate or deferred decommissioning – impacts the overall costs. Many other factors also influence the cost. A 2018 KPMG article about decommissioning costs observes that many entities do not include the cost of managing spent nuclear fuel, removed from the plant areas that will be decommissioned (in the US routinely stored in ISFSIs).

In 2004, in a meeting in Vienna, the International Atomic Energy Agency estimated the total cost for the decommissioning of all nuclear facilities. Decommissioning of all nuclear power reactors in the world would require US$187 billion; US$71 billion for fuel cycle facilities; less than US$7 billion for all research reactors; and US$640 billion for dismantling all military reactors for the production of weapons-grade plutonium, research fuel facilities, nuclear reprocessing chemical separation facilities, etc. The total cost to decommission the nuclear fission industry in the World (from 2001 to 2050) was estimated at US$1 trillion. Market Watch estimated (2019) the global decommissioning costs in the nuclear sector in the range of US$1 billion to US$1.5 billion per 1,000-megawatt plant.

The huge costs of research and development for (geological) longterm disposal of nuclear waste are collectively defrayed by the taxpayers in different countries, not by the companies.

=== Decommissioning funds ===
The costs of decommissioning are to be covered by funds that are provided for in a decommissioning plan, which is part of the facility's initial authorization, before the start of the operations. In this way, it is ensured that there will be sufficient money to pay for the eventual decommissioning of the facility. There are several types of decommissioning fund models, which differ based on ownership structure and the degree of separation from the nuclear operator or the government. In the United States, this may be through saving in a trust fund or a guarantee from the parent company. In the European Union and other regions, public and segregated models are more common, where the state establishes an independent fund that collects fees and oversees decommissioning activities.

Switzerland has a central fund for decommissioning its five nuclear power reactors, and another one for disposal the nuclear waste. Germany also has a state-owned fund for decommissioning of the plants and managing radioactive waste, for which the reactor owners have to pay. The UK Government (the taxpayers) will pay most of the costs for both nuclear decommissioning and existing waste. The decommissioning of all Magnox reactors is entirely funded by the state.

Since 2010, owners of new nuclear plants in the Netherlands are obliged to set up a decommissioning fund before construction is started.

==== Underfunding ====
The economic costs of decommissioning will increase as more assets reach the end of their life, but few operators have put aside sufficient funds.

In 2016 the European Commission assessed that European Union's nuclear decommissioning liabilities were seriously underfunded by about 118 billion euros, with only 150 billion euros of earmarked assets to cover 268 billion euros of expected decommissioning costs covering both dismantling of nuclear plants and storage of radioactive parts and waste.

In February 2017, a committee of the French parliament warned that the state-controlled EDF has underestimated the costs for decommissioning. France had set aside only €23 billion for decommissioning and waste storage of its 58 reactors, which was less than a third of the €74 billion of expected costs, while the UK's NDA estimated that clean-up of UK's 17 nuclear sites will cost between €109-€250 billion. EDF estimated the total cost at €54 billion. According to the parliamentary commission, the clean-up of French reactors will take longer, be more challenging and cost much more than EDF anticipates. It said that EDF showed "excessive optimism" concerning the decommissioning. EDF values some €350 million per reactor, whereas European operators count with between 900 million and 1.3 billion euros per reactor. The EDF's estimate was primarily based on the single historic example of the already dismantled Chooz A reactor. The committee argued that costs like restoration of the site, removal of spent fuel, taxes and insurance and social costs should be included.

Similar concerns about underfunding exist in the United States, where the U.S. Nuclear Regulatory Commission has located apparent decommissioning funding assurance shortfalls and requested 18 power plants to address that issue. The decommissioning cost of small modular reactors is expected to be twice as much respect to Large Reactors.

=== Examples by country ===
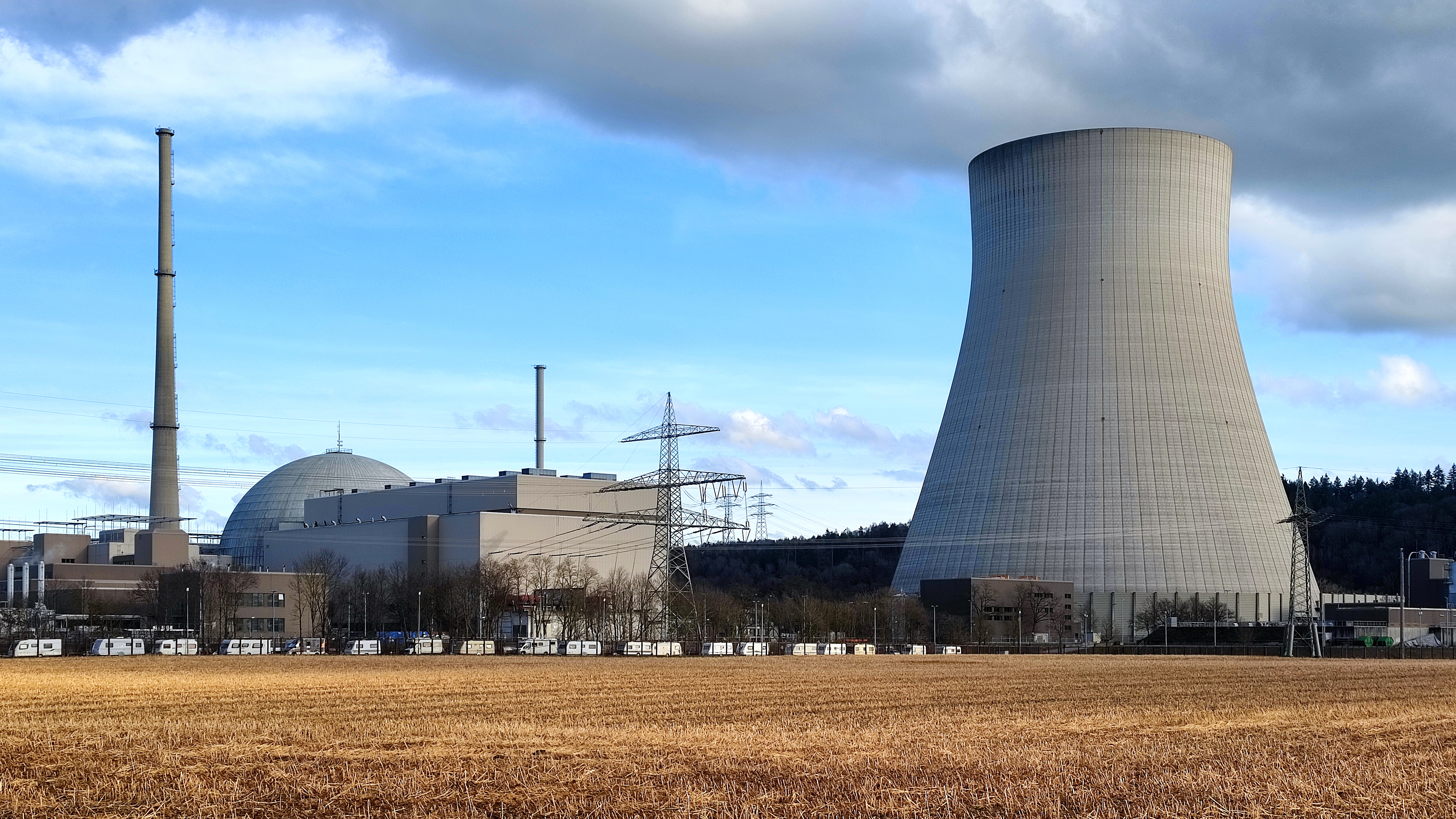
The Isar Nuclear Power Plant in Germany was taken out of service in April 2023.

In France, decommissioning of Brennilis Nuclear Power Plant, a fairly small 70 MW power plant, has already cost €480 million (20 times the originally estimated costs) and is still pending after 20 years. Despite the huge investments in securing the dismantlement, radioactive elements such as plutonium, caesium-137 and cobalt-60 have leaked out into the surrounding lake.

In the UK, the decommissioning costs of civil nuclear assets were estimated in 2020 to be £99 to £232 billion, compared to a previous (2005) estimate of £20-40 billion. The Sellafield site (Calder Hall, Windscale and the reprocessing facility) alone accounts for most of the decommissioning cost and increase in cost; as of 2015, the costs were estimated at £53.2 billion. In 2019, the estimate was even much higher: £97 billion. A 2013 estimate by the United Kingdom's Nuclear Decommissioning Authority predicted costs of at least £100 billion to decommission the 19 existing United Kingdom nuclear sites.

In Germany, decommissioning of Niederaichbach nuclear power plant, a 100 MW power plant, amounted to more than €143 million.

Lithuania has increased the prognosis of decommissioning costs from €2,019 million in 2010 to €3,376 million in 2015.

==== United States ====
The decommissioning can only be completed after the on-site storage of nuclear waste has been ended. Under the 1982 Nuclear Waste Policy Act, a "Nuclear Waste Fund", funded by tax on electricity was established to build a geologic repository. On 16 May 2014, collection of the fee was suspended after a complaint by owners and operators of nuclear power plants. By 2021, the Fund had a balance of more than $44 billion, including interest. Later, the Fund has been put back into the general fund and is being used for other purposes. As the plan for the Yucca Mountain nuclear waste repository has been canceled, DOE announced in 2021 the establishing of an interim repository for nuclear waste.

Because the government has failed to establish a central repository, the federal government pays about half-a-billion dollars a year to the utilities as penalty, to compensate the cost of storage at more than 80 ISFSI sites in 35 states as of 2021. As of 2021, the government had paid $9 billion to utility companies for their interim storage costs, which may grow to $31 billion or more.

Nuclear waste costed the American taxpayers through the Department of Energy (DOE) budget as of 2018 about $30 billion per year, $18 billion for nuclear power and $12 billion for waste from nuclear weapons programs.

KPMG estimated the total cost of decommissioning the US nuclear fleet as of 2018 to be greater than US$150 billion. About two-thirds can be attributed to costs for termination of the NRC operating licence; 25% to management of spent fuel; and 10% to site restoration. The decommissioning of only the three uranium enrichment facilities would have an estimated cost (2004) of US$18.7 to 62 billion, with an additional US$2 to 6 billion for the dismantling of a large inventory of depleted uranium hexafluoride. A 2004 GAO report indicated the "costs will have exceeded revenues by $3.5 billion to $5.7 billion (in 2004 dollars)" for the 3 enrichment facilities slated for decommissioning.

== International collaboration ==
Organizations that promote the international sharing of information, knowledge, and experiences related to nuclear decommissioning include the International Atomic Energy Agency, the Organization for Economic Co-operation and Development's Nuclear Energy Agency and the European Atomic Energy Community. In addition, an online system called the Deactivation and Decommissioning Knowledge Management Information Tool was developed under the United States Department of Energy and made available to the international community to support the exchange of ideas and information. The goals of international collaboration in nuclear decommissioning are to reduce decommissioning costs and improve worker safety.

== Decommissioning of ships, mobile reactors, and military reactors ==
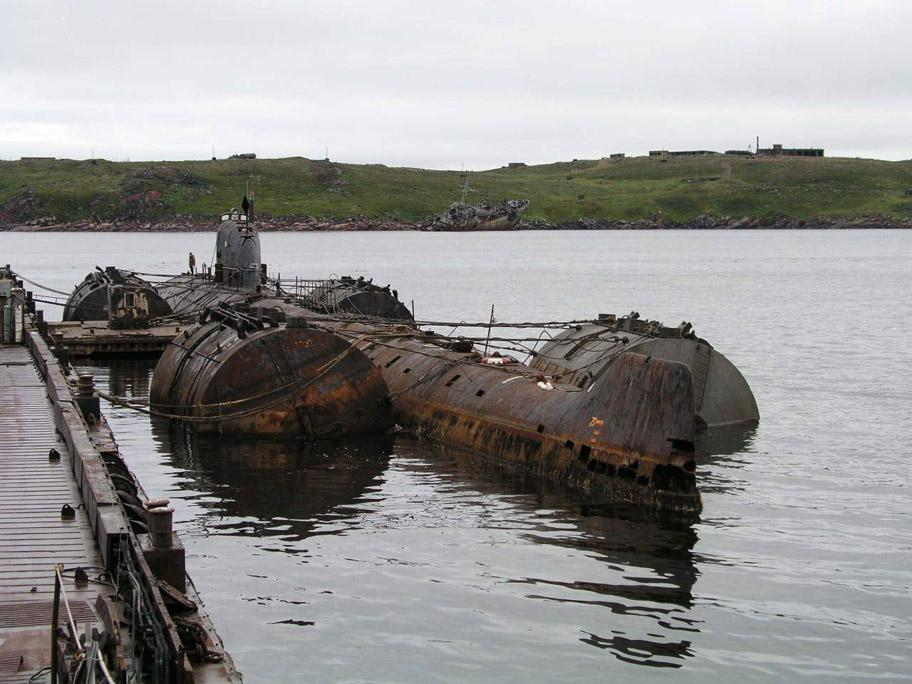
The Soviet nuclear-powered submarine K-159 in decommissioning (before 2004)

Many warships and a few civil ships have used nuclear reactors for propulsion. Former Soviet and American warships have been taken out of service and their power plants removed or scuttled. Dismantling of Russian submarines and ships and American submarines and ships is ongoing. Russia has a fleet of nuclear-powered vessels in decommissioning, dumped in the Barents Sea. Estimated cost for the decommissioning of the two K-27 and K-159 submarines alone was €300 million (2019), or $330 million. Marine power plants are generally smaller than land-based electrical generating stations.

The biggest American military nuclear facility for the production of weapons-grade plutonium was Hanford site (in the State of Washington), now defueled, but in a slow and problematic process of decontamination, decommissioning, and demolition. There is "the canyon", a large structure for the chemical extraction of plutonium with the PUREX process. There are also many big containers and underground tanks with a solution of water, hydrocarbons and uranium-plutonium-neptunium-cesium-strontium (all highly radioactive). With all reactors now defueled, some were put in SAFSTOR (with their cooling towers demolished). Several reactors have been declared National Historic Landmarks.

== List of inactive or decommissioned civil nuclear reactors ==
A wide range of nuclear facilities have been decommissioned so far. The number of decommissioned nuclear reactors out of the List of nuclear reactors is small. As May 2022, about 700 nuclear reactors have been retired from operation in several early and intermediate stages (cold shut-down, defueling, SAFSTOR, internal demolition), but only about 25 have been taken to fully "greenfield status". Many of these sites still host spent nuclear fuel in the form of dry casks embedded in concrete filled steel drums.

As of 2017, most nuclear plants operating in the United States were designed for a life of about 30–40 years and are licensed to operate for 40 years by the US Nuclear Regulatory Commission. As of 2020, the average age of these reactors was about 39 years. Many plants are coming to the end of their licensing period and if their licenses are not renewed, they must go through a decontamination and decommissioning process.

Generally are not included the costs of storage of nuclear waste, including spent fuel, and maintenance of the storage facility, pending the realization of repository sites for long-term disposal (in the US Independent Spent Fuel Storage Installations (ISFSI's). Thus many entities do not include the cost of managing spent nuclear fuel, removed from the plant areas that will be decommissioned. There are, however, large differences between countries regarding inclusion of certain costs, such as on-site storage of fuel and radioactive waste from decommissioning, dismanting of non-radioactive buildings and structures, and transport and (final) disposal of radioactive waste.
The year of costs may refer to the value corrected for exchange rates and inflation until that year (e.g. 2020-dollars).

The stated power in the list is preferably given in design net capacity (reference unit power) in MWe, similar to the List of commercial nuclear reactors.

decommissioning complete, except for on-site storage of nuclear waste
decommissioning in progress
suffered partial or complete core meltdown

Dismantled or inactive civil nuclear reactors
Country	Location	Reactor type	Operative life	Decommissioning	Decommissioning costs
Austria	Zwentendorf	BWR 723 MWe	Never activated due to referendum in 1978	Now a technics museum	
Belgium	SCK•CEN – BR3, located at Mol, Belgium	PWR (BR-3)	1962–1987 (25 years)	2002-	Still unknown
Bulgaria	Kozloduy; Units 1, 2, 3, 4	PWR VVER-440 (4 x 408 MWe)	Reactors 1,2 closed in 2003, reactors 3,4 closed in 2006	Ongoing	Still unknown
Canada	Gentilly; Unit 1 (Québec)	CANDU-BWR; 250 MWe	180 days (between 1966 and 1973)	Ongoing "Static state" since 1986	Still unknown stage two: $25 million
Canada	Gentilly-2(Québec)	CANDU-BWR; 675 MWe	1 October 1983 to 28 December 2012	Ongoing	$1.8 billion (estimated)
Canada	Pickering NGS; Units A2, A3 (Ontario)	CANDU-PWR; 8 x 542 MWe	30 years (from 1974 to 2004)	Ongoing Two units currently in "cold standby" Decommissioning to begin in 2020	Still unknown calculated: $270–430/kWe
China	Beijing (CIAE)	HWWR 10 MWe (multipurpose Heavy Water Experimental Reactor for the production of plutonium and tritium)	49 years (1958–2007)	SAFSTOR until 2027	Still unknown proposed: $6 million for dismantling $5 million for fuel remotion
France	Brennilis	HWGCR 70 MWe	12 years (1967–1979)	Ongoing Phase 3 (fire during decommissioning in 2015)	Still unknown already spent €480 million (20 times the forecasted amount)
France	Bugey; Unit 1	UNGG; Gas cooled, graphite moderator	1972–1994	Ongoing postponed	Still unknown
France	Chinon; Units 1, 2, 3	Gas-graphite	(1973–1990)	Ongoing postponed	Still unknown
France	Chooz-A	PWR 300 MW	24 years (1967–1991)	2007- Ongoing Deferred dismantling; dismantling to finish by 2025	Still unknown
France	Saint-Laurent	Gas-graphite	1969–1992	Ongoing Postponed	Still unknown
France	Rapsodie at Cadarache	Experimental; Fast breeder nuclear reactor (sodium-cooled); 40 MWe	15 years (1967–1983)	1983- Ongoing dismantling planned by 2005; general decontamination planned by 2020	Still unknown
France	Phénix at Marcoule	Experimental; Fast breeder nuclear reactor (sodium-cooled); 233 MWe	36 years (1973–2009)	2005- Ongoing non-nuclear dismantling finished in 2011; finalising expected between 2031 and 2043.	Still unknown
France	Superphénix at Creys-Malville	Fast breeder nuclear reactor (sodium-cooled)	11 years (1985–1996)	Ongoing 1) Defuelled; 2) Extraction of Sodium; Pipe cutting with a robot	Still unknown
East Germany	Greifswald; Units 1, 2, 3, 4, 5, 6	VVER-440; 5 x 408 MWe	Reactors 1–5 closed in 1989/1990, reactor 6: finished but never operated	Ongoing Immediate dismantling (underwater cutting)	Still unknown
East Germany	Rheinsberg; Unit 1	VVER-210; 70–80 MWe	24 years (1966–1990)	Ongoing In dismantling since 1996; Safstor (underwater cutting)	Still unknown
East Germany	Stendal; Units 1, 2, 3, 4	VVER-1000 (4 x 1000 MWe)	Never activated (1st reactor 85% completed)	Not radioactive (Cooling towers demolished; Structure in exhibition inside an industrial park)	Still unknown
West Germany	Gundremmingen-A	BWR; 250 MWe	11 years	Ongoing Immediate dismantling pilot project (underwater cutting)	Still unknown
India	Rajasthan Atomic Power Station; Unit 1 (Rajasthan)	PHWR 100 MWe (similar to CANDU)	44 years (1970–2014)	Ongoing	Still unknown
Japan	Fukushima Dai-ichi; Unit 1	BWR 439 MWe	17 November 1970 – 11 March 2011	Ongoing Since 2011 Tōhoku earthquake and tsunami of 11 March; Hydrogen explosion (INES 7)	Estimated at ¥10 trillion (US$100 billion) for decontaminating Fukushima and dismantling all reactors in Japan and considering long time damage to environment and economy, including agriculture, cattle breeding, fishery, water potabilization, tourism, loss of reputation in the world (without considering further health care spending and reduction of life expectancy).
Japan	Fukushima Dai-ichi; Unit 2	BWR 760 MWe	24 December 1973 – 11 March 2011	Ongoing	Still unknown
Japan	Fukushima Dai-ichi; Unit 3	BWR 760 MWe	26 October 1974 – 11 March 2011	Ongoing	Still unknown
Japan	Fukushima Dai-ichi; Unit 4	BWR 760 MWe	24 February 1978 – 11 March 2011	Ongoing Since 11 March 2011 Reactor defueled when tsunami hit Damage to spent fuel cooling-pool (INES 4)	Still unknown
Japan	Fukushima Dai-ichi; Unit 5	BWR 760 MWe	22 September 1977 – 11 March 2011	Planned decommissioning Cold shutdown since March 11, 2011	Still unknown
Japan	Fukushima Dai-ichi; Unit 6	BWR 1067 MWe	4 May 1979 – 11 March 2011	Planned decommissioning Cold shutdown since 11 March 2011	Still unknown
Japan	Fukushima Daini; Unit 1	BWR 1067 MWe	31 July 1981 – 11 March 2011	Planned decommissioning Cold shutdown since 11 March 2011	Still unknown
Japan	Fugen	Advanced thermal reactor (MOX fuel core, heavy water-BWR); 165 MWe	1979–2003	Ongoing Since March 11, 2011 Cold shutdown	Still unknown
Japan	Tokai; Unit 1	Magnox (GCR) 160 MWe	1966–1998	deferred dismantling: 10 years then decon until 2018	¥93 billion (€660 million of 2003)
North Korea	Yongbyon	Magnox-type (reactor for the production of nuclear weapons through PUREX treatment)	1985–2005 (20 years); Deactivated after a treaty	deferred dismantling; cooling tower dismantled	Still unknown
Netherlands	Dodewaard	BWR Westinghouse; 55 MWe	1968–1997 (28 years)	2002-2100^{+} safe-storage; start dismantling in 2045; separate interim storage of high-level waste at COVRA for 100 years or longer	estimated cost €134 million (1999); €180 million (2016)
Russia	Mayak (Chelyabinsk-65)	PUREX plant for uranium enrichment	1946–1956 (10 years)	Ongoing	Still unknown
Russia	Seversk (Tomsk-7)	Three plutonium reactors Plant for uranium enrichment	Two fast-breeder reactors closed (of three), after disarmaments agreements with USA in 2003.	Ongoing	Still unknown
Spain	José Cabrera	PWR; 1 x 160 MWe (Westinghouse)	38 years (1968–2006)	2010-2023	Still unknown Estimation increased from €135 mln in 2003 to €217.8 mln in 2014
Spain	Santa María de Garoña (Burgos)	BWR/3; 1 x 466 MWe (by Dutch RDM)	1966–2013	Ongoing Defueled	Still unknown
Spain	Vandellós; Unit 1	UNGG; 480 MWe (gas-graphite)	18 years Incident: fire in a turbogenerator (1989)	SAFSTOR: 30 years (internal demolition)	Still unknown Phases 1 and 2: €93 million
Sweden	Barsebäck; Units 1, 2	BWR 2 x 615 MW	Reactor 1: 24 years 1975–1999; Reactor 2: 28 years 1977 – 2005	SAFSTOR: demolition will begin in 2020	The Swedish Radiation Safety Authority has assessed that the costs for decommissioning and final disposal for the Swedish nuclear power industry may be underestimated by SKB by at least 11 billion Swedish kronor ($1.63 billion)
Sweden	Oskarshamn Units 1, 2	BWR 1 x 473 MW BWR 1 x 638 MW	Reactor 1: 45 years 1972–2017; Reactor 2: 41 years 1975 – 2016	Ongoing	Still unknown
Sweden	Ringhals Units 1, 2	BWR 1 x 881 MW PWR 1 x 904 MW	Reactor 1: 44 years 1976–2020; Reactor 2: 44 years 1975 – 2019	Ongoing	Still unknown
Switzerland	DIORIT	MWe CO2-Gas-heavy water (experimental)		Decommissioned	Still unknown
Switzerland	LUCENS	8,3 MWe CO2_{2}-Gas-heavy water (experimental)	(1962–1969); Incident: fire in 1969	Decommissioned	Still unknown
Switzerland	SAPHIR	0,01–0,1 MWe (Light water pool)	39 years (1955–1994) (Experimental demonstrator)	Decommissioned	Still unknown

=== Italy ===
Location	Reactor type	Reactor model	Operative life	Decommissioning	Decommissioning costs
Caorso	BWR	BWR-4 Mark2; 840 MWe	1981 - 1990	1999- ongoing	€450 million (dismantling) + €300 million (fuel reprocessing)
Garigliano	BWR	BWR 1; 150 MWe	1964 - 1982	1999 - ongoing	Still unknown
Latina	GCR	Magnox; 210 MWe Gas-graphite	1962 - 1987	1999 - ongoing	Still unknown
Trino Vercellese	PWR	WH 4-loop Westinghouse, 270 MWe	1965 - 1990	1999 - ongoing	Still unknown

=== Lithuania ===
Plant name	Unit No.	Reactor Type	Operative life	Decommissioning	Decommissioning costs
Ignalina	1	RBMK-1500	1983-2004		unknown
Ignalina	2	RBMK-1500	1987-2009		unknown

=== Slovakia ===
Name	Reactor type	Reactor model	Operative life	Decommissioning	Decommissioning costs
Bohunice A-1	HWGCR	KS 150	1972-1977	decommissioning in the final phase	unknown
Bohunice 1	PWR	VVER-440/V-230	1980-2006	2011-2025	unknown
Bohunice 2	PWR	VVER-440/V-230	1981-2008	2011-2025	unknown

=== South Korea ===
Name	Reactor type	Reactor model	Operative life	Decommissioning	Decommissioning costs
Kori-1	PWR	WH60	1978-2017	Shut down	
Wolsong-1	PHWR	CANDU-6	1983-2019	Shut down	

=== Taiwan ===
Plant name	Unit No.	Reactor type	Reactor model	Operative life	Decommissioning	Decommissioning costs
Jinshan	1	BWR	BWR-4	1978-2018		unknown
Jinshan	2	BWR	BWR-4	1979-2018		unknown
Kuosheng	1	BWR	BWR-6	1981-2021	Shut down	-
Kuosheng	2	BWR	BWR-6	1983-2023	Shut down	-

=== Ukraine ===
Location	Reactor type	Operative life	Decommissioning	Decommissioning costs
Chernobyl-1	RBMK-1000; 1000 MWe	1978-1996	Ongoing	Unknown
Chernobyl-2	RBMK-1000; 1000 MWe	1979-1991	Ongoing	Unknown
Chernobyl-3	RBMK-1000; 1000 MWe	1982-2000	Ongoing	Unknown
Chernobyl-4 (110 km from Kyiv)	RBMK-1000; 1000 MWe	1984-1986	Ongoing ENTOMBMENT (armed concrete "sarcophagus")	Still unknown

=== United Kingdom ===
Location	Reactor type	Operative life	Decommissioning	Decommissioning costs
Berkeley	Magnox (2 x 138 MWe)	1962–1989 (27 years)	save storage	Still unknown
Bradwell	Magnox; 2 x 121 MWe	1962–2002 (40 years)	2002-2083 or later save storage	Still unknown
Calder Hall; Sellafield	Magnox; 4 x 60 MWe	1956-2003 (44–46 years)	save storage	Still unknown
Chapelcross	Magnox; 4 x 60 MWe ("sister reactor" to Calderhall)	1959–2004 (45 years)	save storage	Still unknown
Dounreay DMTR (Research facility of UKAEA)	Fast-neutron reactor	1958–1969	Ongoing Demolition contract awarded December 2018	Still unknown
Dounreay DFR (Research facility of UKAEA)	Loop-type fast breeder. 14 MWe.	1959–1977	Ongoing	Still unknown
Dounreay PFR (Research facility of UKAEA)	Pool-type fast breeder cooled by liquid sodium, fueled with MOX.250 MWe.	1974–1994 (with average 26.9% load); Delays and reliability problems before reaching full power.	Remotely operated robot 'Reactorsaurus' will be sent in to decontaminate equipment as too dangerous a task for a human. Control panel has been earmarked for an exhibition at London Science Museum (2016).	Still unknown
Dungeness A Kent	Magnox; 2 x 275 MWe	1965 to 2006 (41 years)	tbc	unknown
Dungeness B Kent	AGR; 2 x 608 MWe	1983 to 2021 (38 years)	tbc	unknown
Hinkley Point A Somerset	Magnox; 2 x 250 MWe	1965 to 2000 (35 years)	tbc	unknown
Hinkley Point B Somerset	AGR; 2 x 625 MWe	1976 to 2022 (46 years)	tbc	unknown
Hunterston A Ayrshire	Magnox; 2 x 150 MWe	1964 to 1990 (26 years)	tbc	unknown
Hunterston B Ayrshire	AGR; 2 x 624 MWe	1976 to 2021 (45 years)	tbc	unknown
Oldbury; Gloucestershire	Magnox; 2 x 300 MWe	1967 to 2012 (45 years)	tbc	unknown
Sizewell; Suffolk	Magnox; 2 x 290 MWe	1966 to 2006 (40 years)	tbc	unknown
Trawsfynydd; Gwynedd	Magnox; 2 x 250 MWe	1965 to 1991 (26 years)	tbc	unknown
Windscale AGR; Sellafield	AGR; 32 MWe	1963 to 1981 (18 years)	tbc	unknown
Winfrith; Dorset	SGHWR; 92 MWe	1968 to 1990 (22 years)	1995- dismantled; off-site storage of waste	Still unknown

=== United States ===
Location	Reactor type	Operative life	Decommissioning	Decommissioning costs
Connecticut Yankee; Connecticut	PWR; 619 MWe	1968–1996 (28 years)	1998-2007; DECON; on-site ISFSI waste storage	931 mln; additional $575.5 mln in court awarded from DOE for waste storage at 3 plants
Crystal River 3 Florida	PWR; 825 MWe	1977–2009 (32 years)	2013-2037 (estimated); DECON; on-site ISFSI waste storage	In 2013 estimated ~$1,2 bln
Dresden; Unit 1 (Illinois)	BWR; 207 MWe	1960–1978 (18 years)	Defueled in safety in 1998 now in SAFSTOR; Fuel in on-site dry-casks.	Still unknown
Ft. Calhoun (Nebraska)	PWR; 484 MWe	1973-2016 (43 years)	2016-2026 (estimated); DECON; off-site waste storage	$980M
Fort St. Vrain (Colorado)	HTGR (helium-graphite); 330 MWe	1979–1989 (10 years)	1989-1992 (3 years) dismantled; off-site ISFSI waste storage; replaced by conventional station	$283 million
Pacific Gas & Electric – Humboldt Bay; Unit 3	BWR 63 MWe	1963–1976 (13 years)	1988-2021 (33 years); License terminated in Oct 2021; site released for unrestricted use; New license for on-site storage facility for the spent fuel.	Unknown Fund for $53.3 million required for decommissioning of storage alone.
Maine Yankee	PWR; 860 MWe	24 years (closed in 1996)	DECON; on-site ISFSI waste storage	$635 million
Piqua NGS (Ohio)	OCM (Organically Cooled/Moderated) reactor 46 MWe	2 years (closed in 1966)	ENTOMB (coolant design inadequate for neutron flux)	Still unknown
Rancho Seco NGS (California)	PWR 913 MWe	12 years (Closed after a referendum in 1989)	SAFSTOR: 5–10 years completed in 2009 Fuel in insite long-term dry-cask storage	$538.1 million
San Onofre NGS Unit 1 (California)	PWR 436 MWe Westinghouse Electric Corporation	1967–1992 (25 years)	1993-2032 (estimated) dismantled; on-site ISFSI waste storage for whole plant	Still unknown
San Onofre NGS Units 2, 3 (California)	PWR; 1070 MWe; 1080 MWe	Unit 2: 1983–2013; Unit 3: 1984–2013 In 2011, Edison finished replacing the steam generators in both reactors with improved Mitsubishi ones, but the new design had several problems, cracked, causing leaks and vibrations.	in defueling.Permanent shutdown – DECON soon defueling	Still unknown 2014 cost forecast: $3.926 billion to $4.4 billion
Shippingport (Pennsylvania)	BWR 60 MWe	25 years (closed in 1989)	Decon completed dismantled in 5 years (first small experimental reactor)	$98.4 million
Three Mile Island Nuclear Generating Station; Unit 2 (Pennsylvania)	PWR 913 MWe	1978–1979; Core meltdown incident	Post-Defuelling; Phase 2 (1979)	$805 million (estimated)
Trojan (Oregon)	PWR 1,180 MWe	16 years (Closed in 1993 because of proximity to seismic fault)	SAFSTOR (cooling tower demolished in 2006)	
Vermont Yankee	BWR 620 MWe (General Electric)	1972–2014 (42 years)	Ongoing; 2015–	~$1.24 billion
Yankee Rowe (Massachusetts)	PWR 180 MWe	1961–1991 (30 years); Construction cost was $45 million	completed in 2007 on-site ISFSI waste storage	$608 million (See main article)
Zion; Units 1, 2 (Illinois)	2 x PWR 1040 MWe (Westinghouse)	1973/1974–1998 (25 years)	1998-2020 after SAFSTOR full dismantling; New on-site for spent fuel storage	Costs for SAFSTOR unknown; for dismantling & decontamination estimated in 2010 $1 billion + demolition city fees millions; for remaining waste unknown

== See also ==
- Lists of nuclear disasters and radioactive incidents
- Marcoule Nuclear Site in France
- Nuclear Decommissioning Authority
- Nuclear entombment
- Ship-Submarine Recycling Program
