= CIRENE =

Nuclear reactor design and prototype model

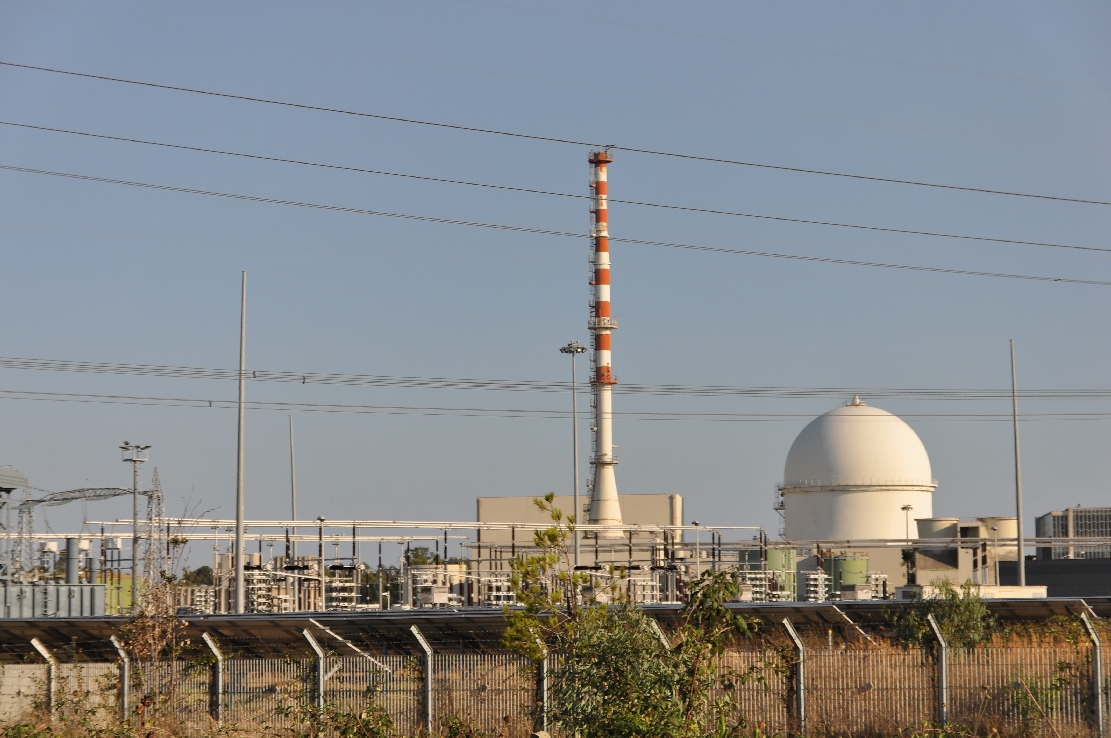
Latina Nuclear Power Plant

CIRENE is an Italian nuclear reactor design and the name of the prototype model that was built at the Latina Nuclear Power Plant south of Rome. CIRENE, an acronym for CISE Reattore a Nebbia (CISE Mist Reactor), uses heavy water as its neutron moderator and normal "light" boiling water as the coolant. This reduces the amount of heavy water required for operations compared to CANDU, still using natural uranium as fuel. CIRENE was one of several similar heavy/light water designs, with similar small-scale units at Gentilly in Canada, SGHWR in the United Kingdom and Fugen in Japan.

Development of the reactor design began in 1950s at CISE and then at CNEN with Enel. A contract was signed in 1972 with Ansaldo to build a 40 MWe prototype at the Latina station. In contrast to similar prototypes, the modular construction of the CIRENE design meant the plant would be very similar to an actual production site in spite of its smaller size. Construction faced numerous delays and the site was still not complete in 1987 when nuclear development in Italy ended. Construction was allowed to continue, as opposed to canceling ongoing contracts, and the plant was completed in 1988. It was then abandoned, never having been loaded with fuel.

CIRENE was one of several reactor designs being researched in Italy, which also included advanced light water designs with US companies and fast breeder reactors in partnership with France and Germany. CIRENE was ultimately the only one these that progressed to the prototype phase; after the Chernobyl accident a 1987 referendum ended the development of nuclear power in Italy and since then all existing reactors have been shut down.
