= Zion Nuclear Power Station =

Decommissioned nuclear power plant in Lake County, Illinois

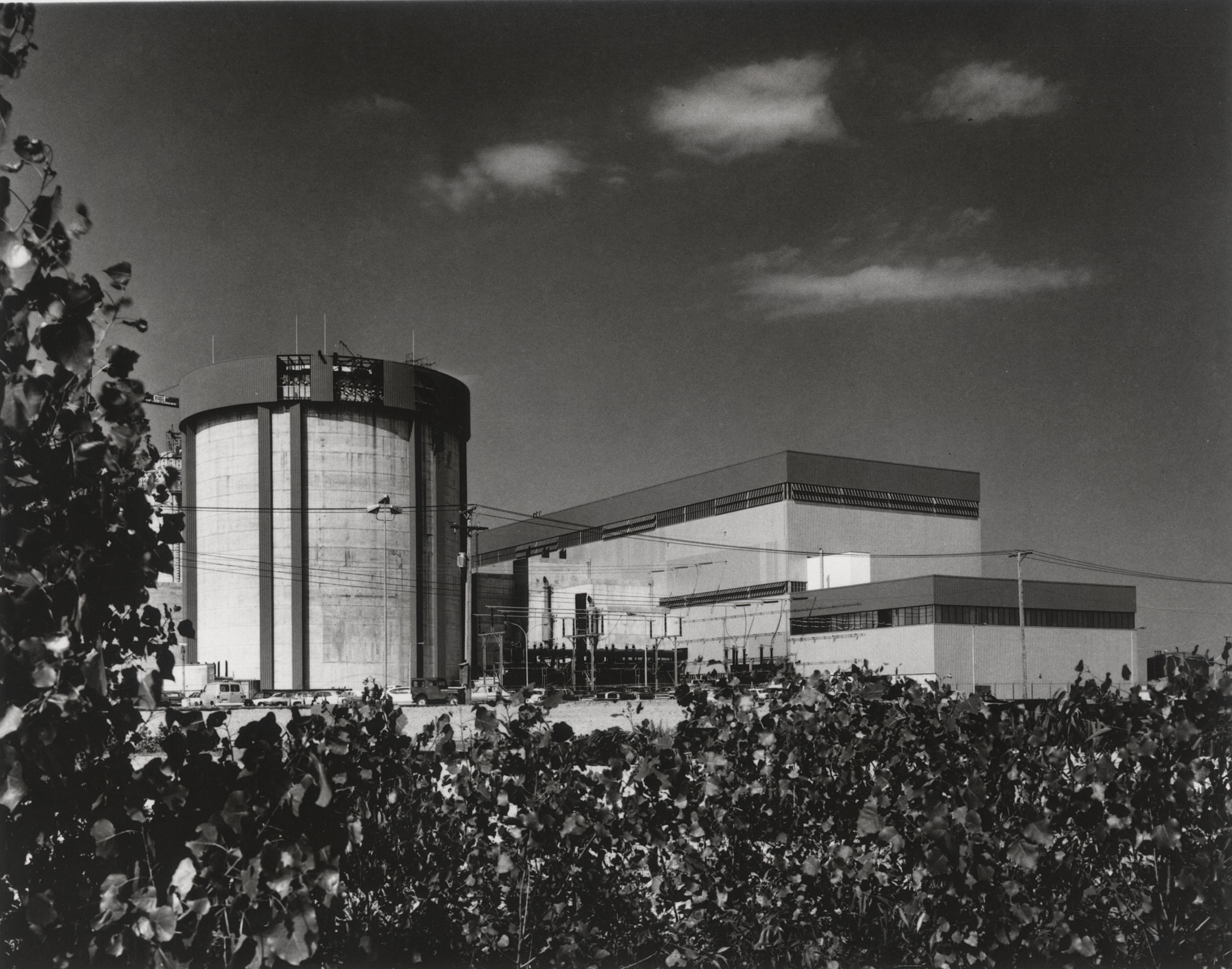
- Country: United States
- Location: Zion, Lake County, Illinois
- Coordinates: 42°26′46″N 87°48′10″W
- Status: Decommissioned
- Construction began: December 1, 1968
- Commission date: Unit 1: December 31, 1973; Unit 2: September 4, 1974
- Decommission date: February 13, 1998
- Owner: Constellation Energy
- Operator: Constellation Energy

Nuclear power station
- Reactor type: PWR
- Reactor supplier: Westinghouse
- Cooling source: Lake Michigan
- Thermal capacity: 2 × 3250 MW_{th} (decommissioned)

Power generation
- Make and model: Westinghouse 4-loop
- Units decommissioned: 2 × 1040 MW
- Capacity factor: 58.3% (lifetime)

External links
- Website: Zion Station
- Commons: Related media on Commons

Zion Nuclear Power Station was the third dual-reactor nuclear power plant in the Commonwealth Edison (ComEd) network and served Chicago and the northern quarter of Illinois. The plant was built in 1973, and the first unit started producing power in December 1973. The second unit came online in September 1974. This power generating station is located on 257 acres (104 ha) of Lake Michigan shoreline, in the city of Zion, Lake County, Illinois. It is approximately 40 direct-line miles north of Chicago, Illinois and 42 miles (68 km) south of Milwaukee, Wisconsin.

The reactors were commissioned in respectively 1973 and 1974, and decommissioned between 1998 and 2020. The power plant was the tallest structure in Lake County.

== Closure ==
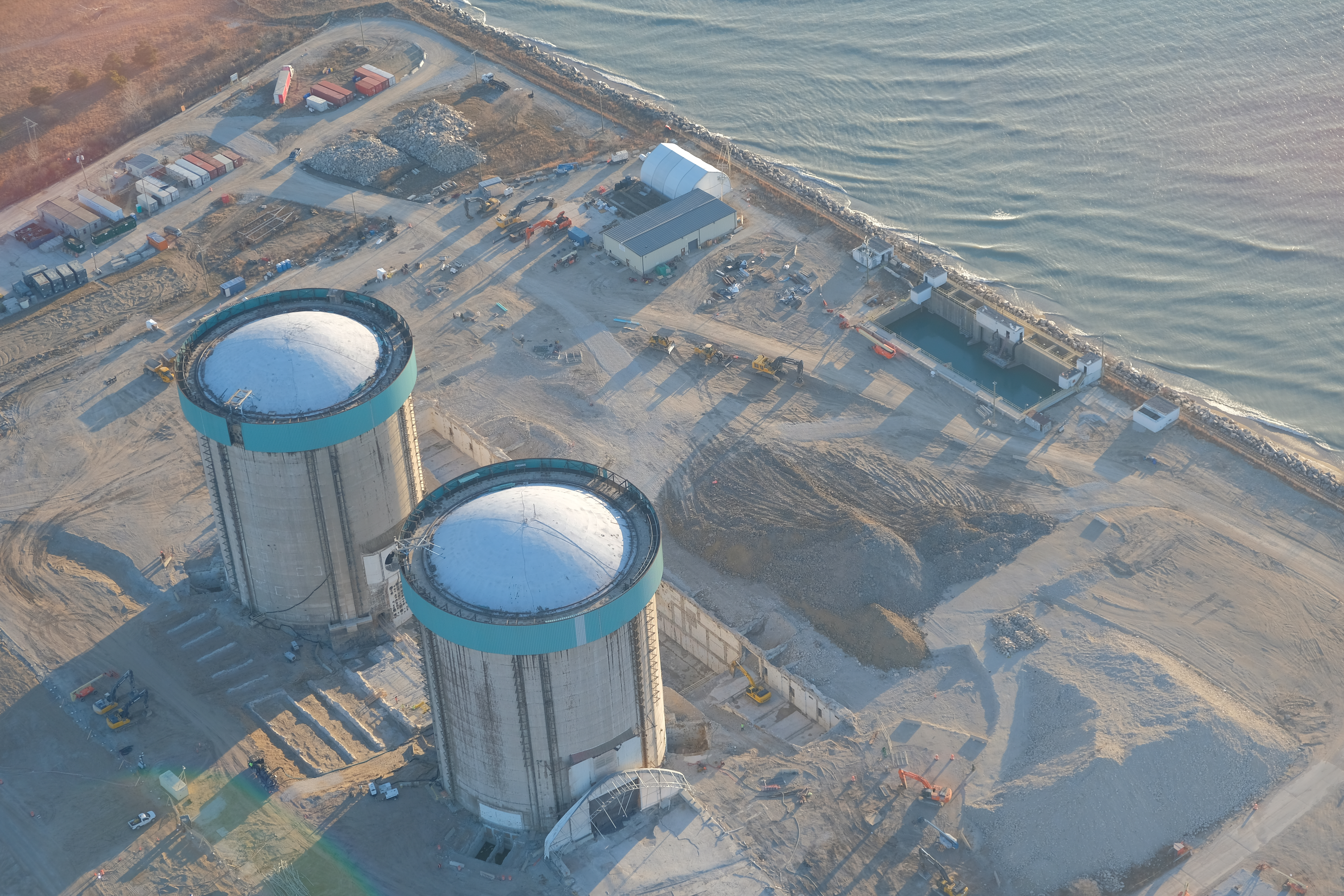
Zion Nuclear Power Station's two reactor buildings stand tall against the backdrop of the grounds around the plant, which is being decommissioned. This photograph was taken from approximately 800–1000 feet above ground level through the passenger side window of a Cessna 172. The Zion Nuclear Power Station site lies just a few miles east of the final approach for Waukegan National Airport.

The Zion Nuclear Power Station was retired on February 13, 1998. The plant had not been in operation since February 21, 1997, after a control-room operator inserted the control rods too far during a shut down of Reactor 1 and then withdrew the control rods without following procedures or obtaining supervisory permission. Reactor 2 was already shut down for refueling at the time of the incident. ComEd concluded that the plant could not produce competitively priced power because it would have cost $435 million to order steam generators which would not pay for themselves before the plant's operating license expired in 2013.

== Decommissioning ==
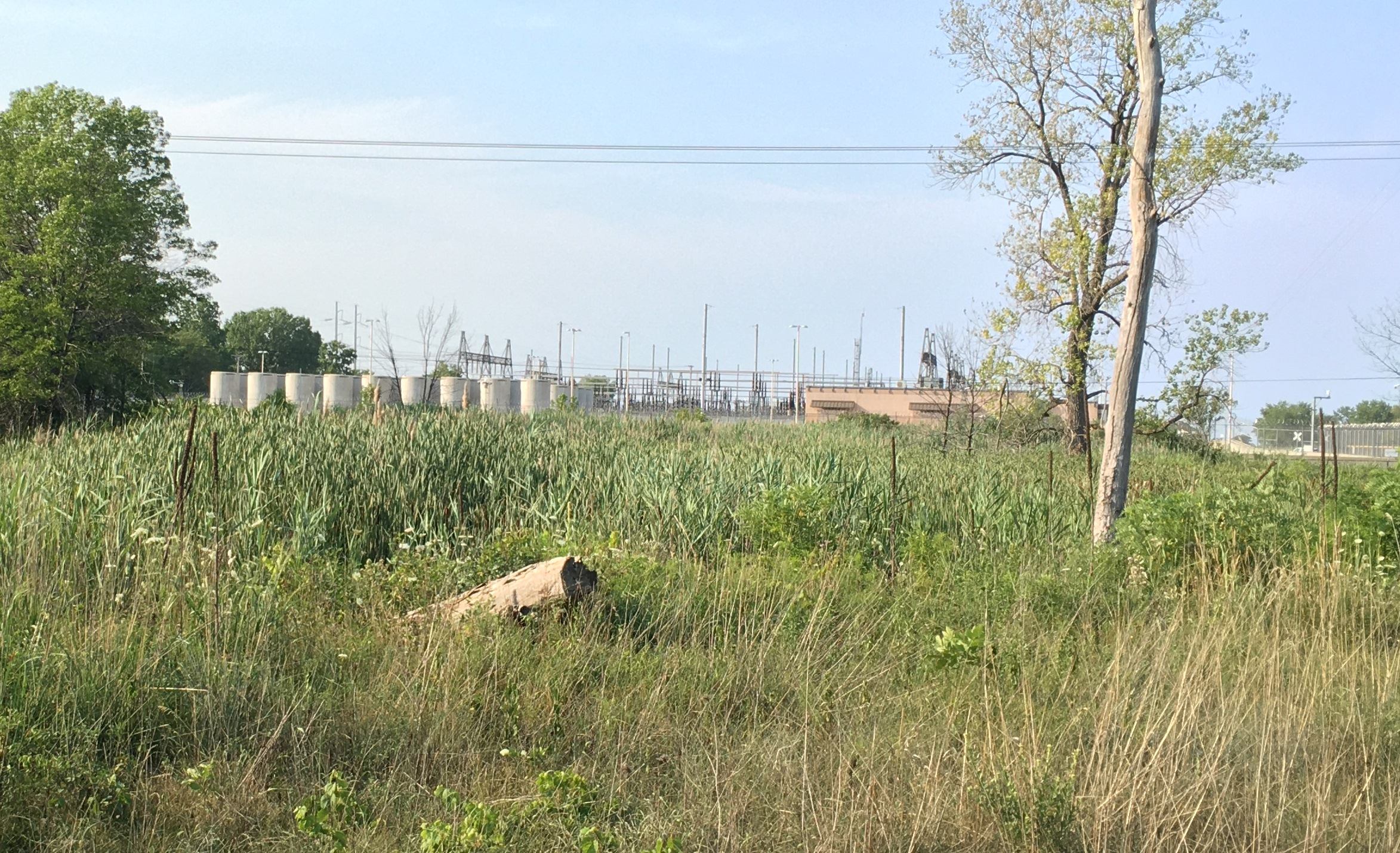
Remaining spent fuel storage tanks, photographed in 2021

All nuclear fuel was removed permanently from the reactor vessel and placed in the plant's on-site spent fuel pool by March 9, 1998. The facility was put in long-term safe storage (SAFSTOR) until decommissioning work was resumed by EnergySolutions in 2010. The Nuclear Regulatory Commission approved the temporary transfer of Exelon's (ComEd's parent company) license to EnergySolutions of Salt Lake City.

Contaminated materials of the dismantled facility were shipped to ZionSolutions' disposal site in Utah and to WCS in Texas for intensive separation. The used nuclear fuel was transferred from the spent fuel pool into dry casks and placed into a newly constructed Independent Spent Fuel Storage Installation (ISFSI) at the Zion site. The transfer of fuel was completed in January 2015. The spent radioactive fuel will remain at the Zion site in concrete dry storage casks. Exelon will resume responsibility of the site, including the ISFSI, when decommissioning is completed.

The costs for the SAFSTOR period are unknown. Costs for dismantling and decontamination after SAFSTOR were estimated in 2010 $1 billion; the city of Zion could charge millions for demolition city fees.

In 2011, EnergySolutions promised investors about $200 million profit from the Zion decommissioning project at margins of as much as 15 to 20 percent. Subsequently, this was lowered to 5 to 10 percent, because the $800 million trust fund ran out of money. A month later, the CEO told them that "the project wasn't about profit but advertising for bigger fish."

On February 14, 2013, a small fire broke out at the shuttered Zion nuclear plant, but authorities said it was put out with one extinguisher and there were no radiation leaks or risks to the public. Workers involved in the decommissioning of the plant were using torches to cut bolts when some grease began to smoke and produce small flames, said Mark Walker of EnergySolutions, the contractor handling the decommissioning.

A January 7, 2017 Chicago Sun-Times article reported that the closing of the nuclear plant strongly and negatively affected the City of Zion economically.

On November 8, 2023, the NRC opened the plant for unrestricted use. Eight days later, the NRC issued the confirming amendments that identify Constellation Energy Generation as the licensee.

== Reactors ==
	Unit 1	Unit 2
Operating status	Permanently closed	
Reactor type	Pressurized water	
Reactor manufacturer	Westinghouse	
Generation capacity	1,040 MWe	
Operational date	June 1973	December 1973
Closure date	January 1998	

== See also ==
- List of largest power stations in the United States
- Nuclear power in the United States
