= Humboldt Bay Nuclear Power Plant =

Decommissioned nuclear power plant in California

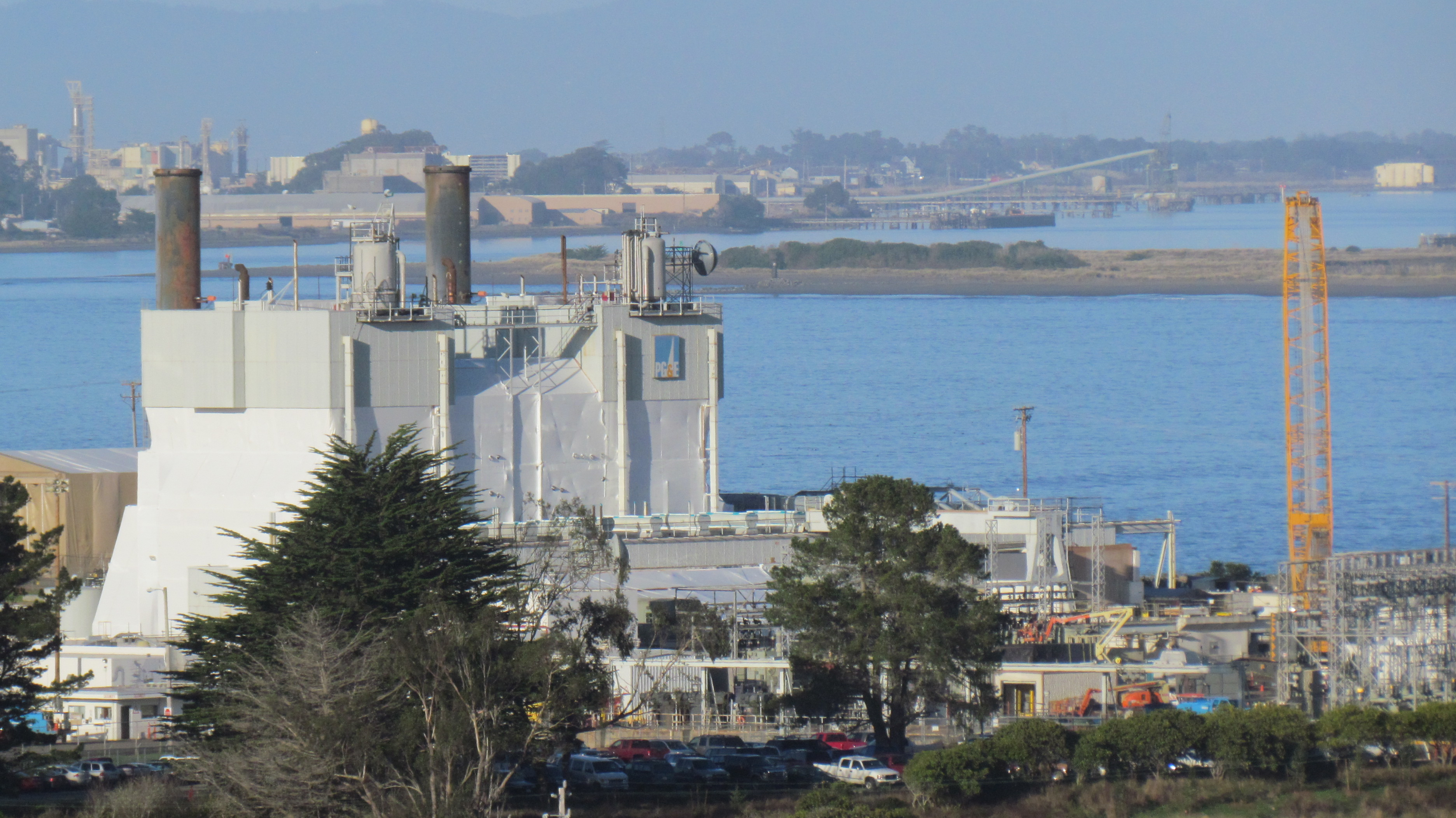
- Humboldt Bay Nuclear Power Plant as seen from Humboldt Hill
- Country: United States
- Location: Humboldt County, near Eureka, California
- Coordinates: 40°44′28.76″N 124°12′32.56″W
- Status: Decommissioned
- Construction began: Unit 3: November 10, 1960
- Commission date: Unit 3: August 1963
- Decommission date: Unit 3: September 30, 2020
- Construction cost: $65 million (decommissioning cost $1.1 billion)
- Owner: Pacific Gas and Electric Company
- Operator: Pacific Gas and Electric Company

Nuclear power station
- Reactors: 1
- Reactor type: BWR
- Reactor supplier: General Electric
- Site elevation: 44 feet (dry cask storage of radioactive fuel and other components)
- Cooling source: Pacific Ocean
- Thermal capacity: 220 MW_{th}

Power generation
- Make and model: General Electric Natural Circulation
- Units decommissioned: 1 x 65 MW

External links
- Commons: Related media on Commons

The Humboldt Bay Power Plant, Unit 3 was a 63 MWe nuclear boiling water reactor, owned by Pacific Gas and Electric Company that operated from August 1963 to July 1976 just south of Eureka, California, in an area referred to as King Salmon and Fields Landing.

== History ==
On Monday, January 23, 1961, Pacific Gas and Electric held a luncheon to invite the community to observe the start of the major construction of the nuclear unit. Once completed, the plant had cost $65 million to build and was commissioned in August 1963.

"According to federal documents, in July of 1970, an operator error caused a sudden loss of power to the cooling water, prompting the water level above the active fuel to plummet to just over 6 inches. The normal water level was 9 feet above fuel." Radioactive steam was vented into the building but not into the environment, according to PG&E at the time. The fuel rods were damaged but not "severely," according to Nuclear Regulatory Commission reports.

The plant was shut down for refueling and seismic upgrades in July 1976, which dragged on due to changing requirements. Concern about previously undiscovered seismic faults combined with more stringent requirements required after the Three Mile Island accident rendered the small plant unprofitable if restarted.

== Missing fuel rods ==
In 2004, Pacific Gas and Electric announced that three nuclear fuel rods were unaccounted for due to conflicting records of their location. The fuel rods were never accounted for, though PG&E investigators believed at the time that they were onsite in the spent fuel storage pool. The investigation is believed to have cost one million dollars.

== Shut down ==
The Humboldt Bay Nuclear Power Plant was shut down in 1976 in part because "seismologists found it was built practically on top of the Little Salmon earthquake fault. Its design was not nearly strong enough to be retrofitted against potential shaking and if an earthquake broke open any critical part of the plant, the results could have been catastrophic."

Unit 3 was permanently shutdown on 2 July 1976.

== Decommissioning ==
PG&E announced plans to shutter the plant in 1983, and it was then placed in SAFSTOR inactive status in 1988.

In December 2003, PG&E submitted a license application for a spent fuel storage facility, which was issued in November 2005. In December 2008, PG&E finished moving the spent nuclear fuel into dry cask storage on site. The dismantlement of the nuclear unit began in 2010 along with the two original fossil-fuel-powered steam-turbine generators on site. The plant's power was replaced by an array of modern, multi-fuel Wärtsilä reciprocating engine-generators in late 2010. The complete dismantlement of Humboldt Bay Power Plant was expected to finish in 2018.

Humboldt Bay nuclear power plant during operation

In the 2012 Nuclear Decommissioning Cost Triennial Proceeding (NDCTP) of the California Public Utilities Commission (CPUC), PG&E requested approval to expend additional funds to remove more of the subterranean unit. As of 2009, PG&E planned to leave in place all HBPP3 structures three feet or more below grade (except for the Spent Nuclear Fuel (SNF) pool), including the concrete caisson surrounding the reactor vessel. In 2012, PG&E concluded that complete removal of the reactor caisson, and containment by a cement slurry wall, is the only appropriate alternative to meet NRC standards for remediating Carbon-14 and Cesium-137 contamination.

Based on PG&E's schedule of planned decommissioning activities, which incorporates various assumptions, including approval of its proposed new scope, decommissioning of the Unit 3 site was expected to conclude in 2019 and was officially deemed complete on November 18, 2021. The cost to PG&E of decommissioning was $1.1 billion.

Between 2010 and about 2018, the facility was completely decontaminated and dismantled after being some 20 years in SAFSTOR. A license termination was issued in October 2021 and the site released for unrestricted use.

== Onsite radioactive dry cask storage ==
Currently, used fuel rods are being stored 44 feet above sea level in containers with very heavy lids. The casks now holding the irradiated parts of the nuclear plant are "heavy, cylindrical, multilayered steel vessel[s]," according to their manufacturer, Holtec International, a New Jersey company that designs and manufactures both parts for nuclear reactors and the equipment used to decommission them. These vessels serve as both "a missile barrier" for terrorist targets and a "radiation shield" to keep the toxics inside, according to the company.

"The casks are made up of three shells. An inner shell for containment, a series of thick steel intermediate shells for gamma shielding and an outer enclosure shell that houses the neutron shielding material, according to Holtec." The casks are inside a subterranean vault made of reinforced concrete 3 to 7 feet thick.

These containers are filled with helium, an inert gas, and will remain onsite so long as Congress and the Department of Energy does not comply with its agreement under the Nuclear Waste Policy Act of 1982. According to the NRC (Nuclear Regulatory Commission), the five dry casks are safe for at least 60 years beyond their licensing agreement. PG&E remains responsible for safely decommissioning the storage facility site after disposal of the fuel.
