= Nuclear entombment =

Method of nuclear decommissioning

Nuclear entombment (also referred to as "safe enclosure") is a method of nuclear decommissioning in which radioactive contaminants are encased in a structurally long-lived material, such as concrete. This prevents radioactive material and other contaminated substances from being exposed to human activity and the environment. Entombment is usually applied to nuclear reactors, but also some nuclear test sites. Nuclear entombment is the least used of three methods for decommissioning nuclear power plants, the others being dismantling and deferred dismantling (also known as "safe storage"). The use of nuclear entombment is more practical for larger nuclear power plants that are in need of both long and short term burials, as well as for power plants which seek to terminate their facility licenses. Entombment is used on a case-by-case basis because of its major commitment with years of surveillance and complexity until the radioactivity is no longer a major concern, permitting decommissioning and ultimate unrestricted release of the property. Considerations such as financial backing and the availability of technical know-how are also major factors.

== Preparation ==
The first step is to cease operations and stow any spent fuel or waste. Nuclear reactors produce high-level waste in the form of spent nuclear fuel, which continues to release decay heat due to its powerful radioactivity. Storing this waste underwater in a spent fuel pool prevents damage and safely absorbs the radiation. Over a period of years the radioactivity and heat generation declines, until the spent fuel can be removed from the water and stored in casks for burial. When a reactor is decommissioned, partially spent fuel can be treated the same way. The reactor is sealed in order to allow no escape of radioactive particles or gases. Lastly the heating water is then pumped out and put in containers to await proper decontamination. Decontamination is the process of removal of radioactive contaminants on the remaining surface. Washing and mechanical cleaning are processed during the decontamination process by using the chemical reactors, and the global objective is to protect public safety and the environment. The coolant is also removed and stored for proper disposal. This procedure is often performed by the company that owns the plant, and if the company is unable to then properly qualified contractors are brought in. After this procedure comes the next one which deals with the radioactivity and radioactive waste.

The second procedure is the dismantling of the site. The decommissioning project is for removing the radioactive materials. Thermal cutting and mechanical cutting are two technical ways to dismantle and demolish. Thermal cutting is used for the metals by burning with high energy in one concentration area. The mechanical cutting takes place in the workshop with mechanical force and cuts reactive materials into two parts or in small pieces. The most dangerous waste is placed inside radioactive-resistant containers, after which the containers are transported to storage facilities. The rest of the site can then be decontaminated. The site is then checked thoroughly for any signs of radiation. Most of the remaining waste onsite can be disposed of normally as it is either not contaminated or radioactivity levels have dropped to within safe limits. This process is often completed using robots, which are able to access the difficult to reach areas deemed too radioactive for human workers. The robot was made by WWER-440-type-NNR and is mostly in central and Eastern of Europe, Russia. The main idea of using robots in decontamination is to reduce the radioactive to a level, therefore workers can be exposed. The robot's energy was provided from the robot control system and was placed in the manipulator. The manipulator can be controlled by the remote. The "Decomler" robot works in decontamination by using the wheel system and track system. Also, the robot needs to be strictly licensed by national regulating authorities, because the materials processed by the robot need to ensure they are not discharged to outside. Otherwise, it will cause nuclear pollution to both the environment and humans.

== Entombment ==
Entombment is a more time-intensive process than protective storage and dismantlement as a decommissioning mode. The simplest of the procedures is entombing the radioactive waste source at the site itself. After containment and disposal of lower-level radioactive spent fuel sources, the entombment process of high-level radioactive parts of the plant may begin. The entombment itself is accomplished by numerous layers of sturdy materials, concrete usually among them. The first step is to cover the area with a protective shield which is usually made up of radioactive-resistant materials - this allows workers to continue working with a significantly lower radioactive environment. The second step is the most crucial and time-consuming. Cementitious materials are used to encase the site in cement, absorbent grout, and/or infills. Each layer of cement, grout or infills must set and cure before the next layer is added. Time and proper testing is required to ensure the safe containment of radiation within the layers of cement. The final step is often to surround the site in a clay or sand/gravel mixture and then soil is laid on top of the site.

Entombment designs must be defined and agreed upon by an authorized organization, like the NRC. These designs must also be an approved alternative to other decommissioning methods. Furthermore, because the nuclear facility is often in close proximity to other public environments, the public must accept entombment as a decontamination & decommissioning (D&D) option before proceeding. Small-scale tests will sometimes be performed to prove to organizations like the NRC that a standard process can be transferred. A consortium approach is also necessary to ensure a broader understanding and funding of nuclear entombment. Sites for potential entombment have been identified in the U.K., Japan, Lithuania, Russia, and Taiwan but further research and development of nuclear entombment methods has been called for as of the early 21st century. Sites must be routinely checked for breaches in the containment barrier for decades. Therefore, entombment is often considered as a last resort solution to the decommissioning of a nuclear power plant or nuclear disaster site.

== Concerns ==
Many of the concerns of nuclear entombment center around ethics and long-term reliability. Given the inherently dangerous contents of entombment structures, they serve as a serious disamenity to nearby residents. Once established, entombment structures cannot practically be transported or modified, making disposal sites effectively permanent for their intended lifespan often up to 1,000 years. In addition, the intended permanence of such structures raises the concern of leak integrity over long periods of time. Should a leak occur, the nuclear waste contents could potentially radioactively contaminate nearby water sources, posing a serious health risk to surrounding inhabitants and the biosphere, possibly violating the polluter pays principle. Public perception plays an important role in the development of nuclear entombment sites and it can be difficult to ensure a steady supply of both funding and willing workers.

Constant, thorough monitoring and sanitation of any nuclear entombment site is required to ensure its stability and effectiveness over a long period of time, a significant expense that is not necessarily predictable for the entire life of the site, leaving a financial liability for future generations. The health and safety of workers monitoring the structure is also a concern; for reference Chernobyl Entombment workers receive about 9.2 mSv per month, compared to the average US resident receiving 3.1 mSv per year.

Entombment is not a solution for every type of radioactive waste and is not viable for long-lived radionuclides.

== Benefits ==
The surveillance cost will be lower than the surveillance cost for SAFSTOR (safe storage) option. The cost for entombment is less than the cost for dismantling, since it uses for disposal the same facility from which the waste came. However, this cost is eternal and may be higher in the course of years. The use of entombment requires fewer workers and prevents them from being in major contact with the nuclear waste. In some cases, entombment also provides further financial benefits through reducing costs devoted to waste conditioning and management, as radioactive waste can be placed within the vicinity of entombment enclosures to benefit from decay. In addition to reducing cost, it also minimizes public interaction with the project and the amount of nuclear radiation emitted from the waste. By disposing of the nuclear waste in the same facility it will allow engineers to reinforce the facility to ensure safety for the public and the environment. Entombment is also preferable in instances of time sensitive scenarios, in which the deferred dismantling of a nuclear power plant could potentially increase financial burden and/or the hazardous radioactive decay. Beyond direct practical benefits, entombment has also been explored as a step that can benefit the overall decontamination and decommissioning process, though further research and development is needed before it can be deemed a viable option.

== United States Nuclear Regulatory Commission ==
The United States Nuclear Regulatory Commission (USNRC) provides licensing for the entombment process, as well research and development (R&D) programs to help decommission nuclear power plants. USNRC will continue the development of rule making for entombment. NRC asks companies running power plants to set money aside while the power plant is operating, for future shut down and cleanup costs. The NRC has decided in order for nuclear entombment to be possible, a long-term structure must be created specifically for the encasing of the radioactive waste. If the structures are not correctly built, water can seep into them and infect the public with radioactive waste. The NRC has imposed acts such as the Nuclear Waste Policy Act of 1982 and the Low-level radioactive waste policy. These policies help regulate state governments on the procedures and precautions needed to dispose of the nuclear waste. The Nuclear Waste Policy of 1982 states the federal government's responsibility is to provide a permanent disposal facility for high-level radioactive waste and spent nuclear fuel. If states have also agreed to follow §274 of the Atomic Energy Act they may take on the responsibility of disposing of low-level waste and receive facilities from the federal government for this purpose.

Other commissions in the pursuit of improving nuclear entombment as a solution include the Cementitious Barriers Partnership (CBP) and the U.S. Department of Energy (DOE). Research facilities such as those at the Savannah River and Lawrence Livermore Laboratory have contributed to the understanding of safe nuclear entombment.

== Containment examples ==
There are several examples of successful entombment procedures completed. In El Cabril, Spain, a multi-concrete barrier concept was used wherein the radioactive waste drums are placed inside concrete boxes. Those boxes are then placed inside a reinforced concrete vault sealed with a waterproof coating to prevent any hazardous liquid from escaping the drums. In the Hallam Nuclear Power Facility, expanding concrete, seal-welding at penetrations, sand, waterproof polyvinyl membranes, and earth were all used to envelop radioactive residuals. At the Piqua Nuclear Power Facility, seal-weldings and sand were again used to seal the internal reactor, and lastly sealed with a waterproof membrane. At the Boiling Nuclear Superheater Power Station (BONUS) in Rincón, Puerto Rico, a concrete slab was constructed to cover the upper surface while seal-welding was used to secure lower surface penetrations.

The Chernobyl disaster is one of the worst nuclear disasters. The initial containment building, commonly known as the sarcophagus, did not classify as a proper entombment device. It was difficult or impossible to repair and maintain because of extremely high levels of radiation. A new structure was structurally completed and put in place in late 2016, and was completed in 2019. The structure measures 108 meters tall, with a length of 260 meters and a span of 165 meters. The main arch is composed of triple-layered radiation resistant panels made up of stainless steel coated in polycarbonate, which will provide the shielding necessary for radioactive containment. The structure weighs over 30,000 tons and completely covers Reactor number 4. This new tomb is designed to last over 100 years, and has special ventilation and temperature systems to prevent condensation of radioactive fluids on the inside which could result in a compromised containment. The new containment structure is still intended to be temporary, with the goal of allowing the Ukrainian Government and the EU time to develop ways of properly decommissioning the plant and cleaning up the site.

== Other examples ==
- Lucens, Switzerland - initially entombed in a cavern and later decontaminated
- Dodewaard, the Netherlands - entombed for 40 years, awaiting final decommissioning; also referred to as 'safe enclosure'
- Runit Dome, Marshall Islands - large concrete tomb constructed in 1980 in an atomic blast crater, encasing contaminated soil
- Hanford site, USA - eight reactors have been semi-entombed for full decommission at an undefined point in the future. This facility also contains Trench 94, which is where the United States Navy puts its decommissioned nuclear reactors.

== See also ==
- Nuclear Decommissioning Authority
