= Gentilly Nuclear Generating Station =

Decommissioned nuclear power plant in Bécancour, Quebec

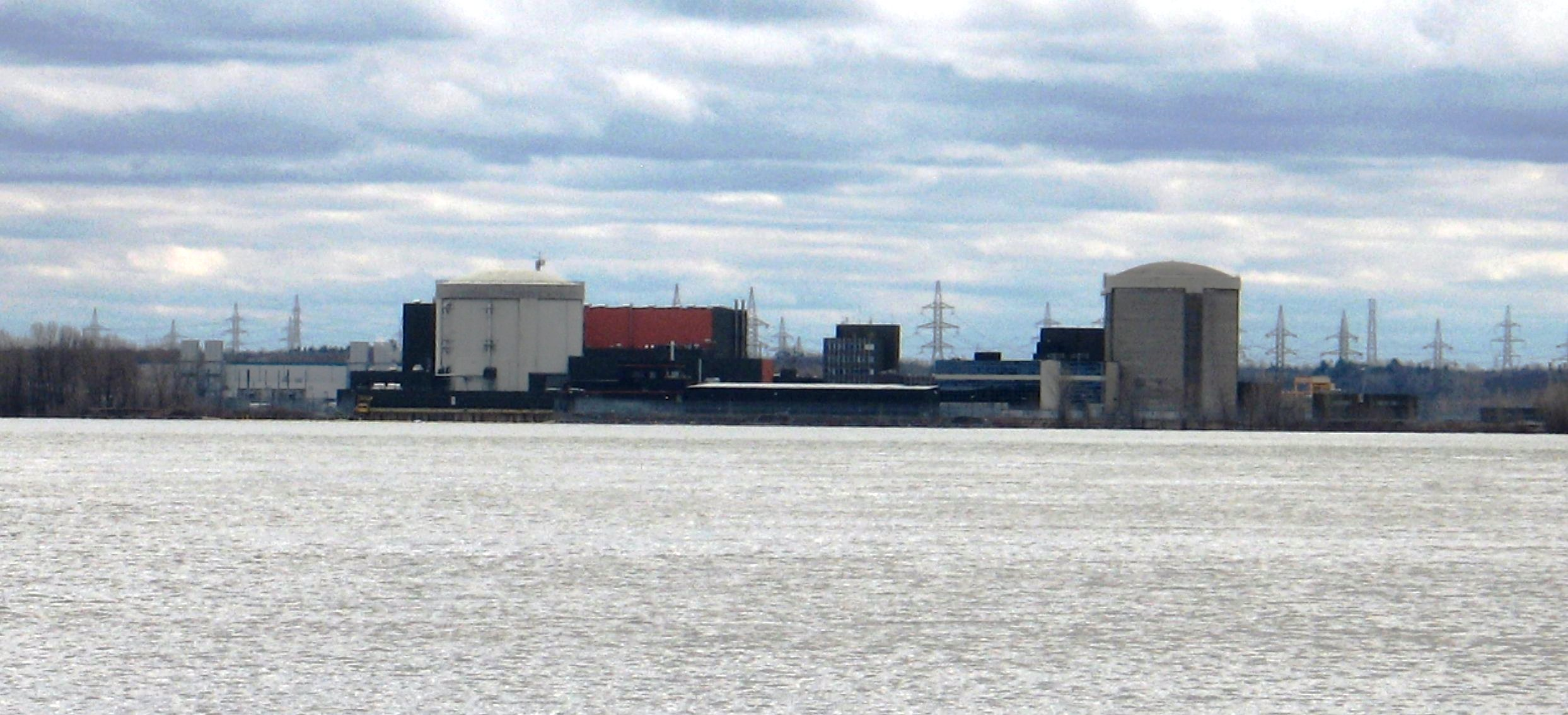
- The Gentilly-2 (left) and Gentilly-1 (right) nuclear generating stations
- Official name: Centrale nucléaire de Gentilly
- Country: Canada
- Location: Bécancour, Quebec
- Coordinates: 46°23′45″N 72°21′25″W
- Status: safe storage (pools) pending dismantling
- Construction began: 1973
- Commission date: October 1, 1983
- Decommission date: December 28, 2012
- Construction cost: CAD 1.3 billion
- Owner: Hydro-Québec
- Operator: Hydro-Québec

Nuclear power station
- Reactor type: CANDU-BWR; CANDU PHWR
- Reactor supplier: Atomic Energy of Canada Limited

Power generation
- Units operational: None
- Units cancelled: 1 × 640 MW
- Units decommissioned: 1 × 250 MW; 1 × 675 MW
- Nameplate capacity: 925 MW
- Capacity factor: 76.4%
- Annual net output: 3,491 GW·h

External links
- Website: Hydro-Québec: Gentilly-2
- Commons: Related media on Commons

Gentilly Nuclear Generating Station (Centrale nucléaire de Gentilly in French) is a former nuclear power station located on the south shore of the St. Lawrence River in Bécancour, Quebec, 100 km north east of Montreal. The site contained two nuclear reactors; Gentilly-1, a 250 MW CANDU-BWR prototype, that was marred by technical problems and shut down in 1977, and Gentilly-2, a 675-MW CANDU-6 reactor operated commercially by the government-owned public utility Hydro-Québec between 1983 and 2012. These were the only power generating nuclear reactors in Quebec. (Note: There is also a SLOWPOKE research reactor at Montreal's École Polytechnique.)

The Gentilly reactors were constructed in stages between 1966 and 1983 and were originally part of a plan for 30-35 nuclear reactors in Quebec. A third reactor, Gentilly-3, was scheduled to be built on the same site but was cancelled because of a drop in demand growth in the late 1970s.

In October 2012, it was decided for economic reasons not to proceed with the refurbishment of Gentilly-2, and to decommission the power plant instead. The process will take approximately 50 years to complete. That December, the remaining reactor was shut down and the decommissioning process started.

In August 2023, Hydro-Québec reported it was assessing the state of the plant to determine whether or not the Gentilly-2 CANDU reactor could be recommissioned. This came as the province of Quebec looked towards options to increase its production of clean electricity. It was decided to not proceed with recommissioning Gentilly-2 due to social acceptability issues.

== Gentilly-1 ==
Gentilly-1 was a prototype CANDU-BWR reactor, based on the SGHWR design. It was designed for a net output of 250MW(e). The reactor had several features unique amongst CANDU reactors, including vertically oriented pressure tubes (allowing for the use of a single fuelling machine below the core), and light-water coolant. These features were intended to reduce the cost and complexity of the unit, again to make it an attractive export unit. However, the design was not successful, and over 7 years recorded only 180 on-power days. Gentilly-1 is no longer in operation.

== Gentilly-2 ==
Gentilly-2 was a standard CANDU 6 reactor, similar to the Point Lepreau Nuclear Generating Station. The plant had a net output of 675MW(e). Unlike the adjacent Gentilly-1 reactor, Gentilly-2 had a good service record since start-up in 1982, with a cumulative operating factor of 76.4%.

In an August 19, 2008 announcement, Québec planned to spend $1.9B to overhaul Gentilly-2 in order to extend its lifespan to 2040. Refurbishment of the reactor was eventually cancelled when on 3 October 2012, Hydro-Quebec's CEO, Thierry Vandal, announced the decommissioning of the Gentilly-2 generating station for economic reasons, scheduled to occur on 28 December 2012 at 10:30 p.m. At that time, a decommissioning process will proceed over a period of 50 years and is expected to cost $1.8 billion. The permanent shut down and decommissioning of the power plant followed an election pledge from Quebec premier Pauline Marois.

The Gentilly site also houses a 411MW gas turbine generation plant. The Bécancour generating station was commissioned in 1992-1993.

== Gentilly-3 ==
Gentilly-3 was a proposed nuclear reactor at the Gentilly site. It was cancelled by Quebec Premier René Lévesque. A white book study published by the Parti Québécois (PQ) before ascending to power found that Gentilly-3 was not needed for Quebec's future energy needs and that it could be fulfilled with hydroelectricity. After the election of the PQ government, a moratorium on construction of nuclear plants was put into place. The reactor had been scheduled to be completed before 1990, and was the last reactor firmly committed to by Hydro-Québec and the Province of Quebec, though Quebec had committed to buy enough heavy water for four Candu style reactors, processed by the La Prade heavy water plant (near Trois-Rivières), scheduled for 1982 opening.

== See also ==
- Economy of Quebec
- List of electrical generating stations in Quebec
- List of power stations in Canada
