= Sheldon Power Station =

Power station near Hallam, Nebraska, U.S.

Coordinates: 40°33′33″N 96°47′05″W

Sheldon Power Station is a coal-fired power station located near Hallam, Nebraska. It is the site of the former Hallam Nuclear Generating Station which operated from 1962 to 1964.

== Plant information ==
Construction of Sheldon Station began in 1958—first as a combined nuclear and conventional facility. It was the pioneer sodium graphite nuclear power plant in the nation. The nuclear portion of the plant began operating early in 1963 and was at full power by July, 1963. However, this portion of the facility was ordered decommissioned by the former Atomic Energy Commission (AEC), now the Nuclear Regulatory Commission, in 1964.

The AEC, which built the atomic plant, said it had garnered all the information it wanted about the sodium graphite plant and the former Consumers Public Power District, which cooperated in the project, said it didn't care to operate the nuclear portion of the facility any longer. The decommissioning work was done under the direction of Consumer's employees. It was up to the AEC to determine what to do with the components.

Some of the nuclear equipment was shipped to other nuclear plants for reuse while other equipment was stored in Idaho and Washington for future AEC use. What couldn't be moved was buried within mammoth "burial vaults" of concrete and then the "leftovers," including the reactor core, were sealed below the surface of the earth.

In addition to the nuclear portion of the plant, Sheldon Station has produced electricity for the Nebraska grid system since 1961 from a conventional coal- and gas-fired boiler. As the nuclear facility was being deactivated, a second generator was being installed and this was followed by a second conventional boiler. By July, 1968, all construction was completed and the plant was operating at its full 225,000 kilowatt capacity with two power generating units.

Each of the two boilers supplies steam to drive its own electric generator. The plant's water supply comes from its own deep wells and the discharge of water from the plant is watched and carefully controlled to assure that it is not detrimental to the environment. To conserve water, cooling towers are used to dissipate the waste heat from the steam condenser thus permitting the water to be recycled.

Major modifications were completed in 1974 at a cost of $4.2 million to accommodate switching the facility from using natural gas as the primary fuel to low sulfur coal. Involved was the construction and installation of enlarged coal storage and handling facilities necessary in making the transition to using only low sulfur coal.

In addition, the installation of electrostatic precipitators to bring the facility into conformance with clean air requirements resulted in an expenditure of some $12.2 million. The precipitator on one stack was completed in December, 1975, and on the other in July, 1976. Installation of equipment to meet regulations on the chemical discharge of water had a price tag of some $7 million.

In a concentrated effort to eliminate concern over the plant's effect on the environment, NPPD states flatly and simply that Sheldon Station will meet all federal and state air pollution and water quality control standards and regulations.

== Location ==
Sheldon Station is located 17 miles south and five miles west of Lincoln or one mile north of Hallam in Lancaster County, Nebraska.

The switchyard is located west of the plant buildings and the coal stockpile is located north of the buildings.

Power generated is distributed throughout Nebraska via two substations. The Sheldon 115 KV substation has connections to Lincoln, Mark T. Moore substation, Crete, Norris Public Power District, Sterling, Beatrice, and Firth. The Mark T. Moore 345 KV substation connects to Lincoln, McCool Junction, Pauline, Cooper Nuclear Station, and Wagener (LES). From these points the plant has interconnections to the entire United States.

== Unit specifications ==
Unit 1 (Coal Fired)

Generating Capacity	105,000 Kilowatts (net)
Physical Size	135 feet high - 165 feet wide - 350 feet long
Chimney Height	176 feet
Cooling Water Circulating Capacity	60,000 gal. per minutes
Coal Capacity at Full Capacity	65 tons per hour
Boiler Manufacturer	Babcock & Wilcox
Ground Breaking	June 28, 1958
Commercial In-Service Date	July 1961

Unit 2 (Coal Fired)

Generating Capacity	120,000 kilowatts (net)
Physical Size	135 feet high - 143 feet wide - 350 feet long
Chimney Height	176 feet
Cooling Water Circulating Capacity	60,000 gal. per minutes
Coal Capacity at Full Capacity	74 tons per hour
Boiler Manufacturer	Babcock & Wilcox
Ground Breaking	June 28, 1958
Commercial In-Service Date	July 1968

Combined Units

Coal Source	Wyoming Powder River Basin
Construction Cost	$38,000,000*
Type of Coal	Subbituminous, Low Sulfur Western (Wyoming)
Operating Personnel	95

- Doesn't include $23,400,000 which was spent for environmental improvement in the mid 1970s.

== Name ==
C. C. Sheldon was a nationally known figure in public power and conservation of soil and water resources whose constructive influence extended into many spheres of public, business and religious life.

He was born May 29, 1871, at Clifton, Ill., and moved with his family at a young age to Columbus, Nebraska. Throughout his life, Sheldon maintained an active interest in banking, other businesses and agriculture and was devoted to the importance of resource conservation.

Sheldon was one of the pioneers in the development of hydroelectric power from the Loup River. He was one of the organizers of the Loup River Public Power District in 1933, serving as its first treasurer and a director. His many services included extensive efforts in obtaining passage of the Enabling Act for the creation of public power districts in the 1933 Nebraska Legislature.

He played a leading role in the establishment of Consumers Public Power District, a predecessor of Nebraska Public Power District, and was an original director and first treasurer.

Sheldon died January 10, 1964, at Columbus, at the age of 92.
