= Steam-Generating Heavy Water Reactor =

Nuclear power system

The Steam Generating Heavy Water Reactor (SGHWR) was a United Kingdom design for commercial nuclear reactors. It uses heavy water as the neutron moderator and normal "light" water as the coolant. The coolant boils in the reactor, like a boiling water reactor, and drives the power-extraction steam turbines.

A single prototype of the design, the 100 MWe "Winfrith Reactor", was connected to the grid in 1967 and ran until 1990. A larger commercial design with a 650 MWe power rating was selected in 1974 as the basis for future reactor builds in the UK, but declining electricity use led to this decision being reversed in 1976 and no production models were ever built.

SGHWR was among a number of similar designs, which include the CANDU-derived Gentilly Nuclear Generating Station in Quebec, the Fugen Advanced Test Reactor in Japan, and the never-commissioned CIRENE reactor in Italy. These designs differ with the baseline CANDU design, which uses heavy water as the coolant as well as the moderator.

== History ==
SGHWR was a departure from previous UK designs, which had used graphite as the moderator and carbon dioxide gas as the coolant. The original Magnox was designed to run on natural uranium but the subsequent Advanced Gas-cooled Reactor (AGR) abandoned this for a variety of reasons, using low-enriched uranium instead.

Although Magnox was technically successful it was expensive. For future orders, several alternative reactor design concepts were studied during the early 1960s. As part of this program, a 100 megawatt electrical (MWe) prototype of the SGHWR was built at Winfrith in the 1960s and was connected to the grid in 1967. It is often known simply as the "Winfrith Reactor". The other designs produced similar sub-scale prototypes of the High Temperature Reactor also at Winfrith, the Magnox-derived AGR at Windscale, and the Prototype Fast Reactor at Dounreay.

This contest ultimately selected the AGR design, and several AGRs began construction in the late 1960s. These quickly ran into problems, and by the early 1970s the design was considered a failure. In 1974, a larger version of the SGHWR with a design power of 650 MWe was selected for future power plant builds. In 1976 this decision was reversed due to the combination of a predicted sharp drop in electricity demand, higher than expected costs, and the lack of obvious export potential in a shrinking nuclear market. Given the limited number of new reactors expected in the future, modified versions of the AGR were selected over SGHWR as no further development effort was needed.

The Winfrith Reactor reactor remained operational and was used for a wide variety of purposes until it ceased operation in October 1990 after 23 years of operations. As of 2019 it is in the process of being decommissioned by Magnox Ltd on behalf of the Nuclear Decommissioning Authority. Between 2022 and 2024, 1068 drums of radioactive waste were transported by train to the Low Level Waste Repository. The material was once intermediate-level waste but had decayed down to low-level waste while being stored at Winfrith.

== Design ==
SGHWR is similar to the Canadian CANDU reactor designs in that it uses a low-pressure reactor vessel containing the moderator and high-pressure piping for the coolant. This both reduces the total amount of expensive heavy water required, as well as reducing the complexity of the reactor vessel, which in turn reduces construction costs and complexity.

It differs in that it uses ordinary "light" water as a coolant, whereas CANDU uses heavy water here as well. Light water reduces the neutron economy to the point where natural uranium can no longer be used as fuel. The ability to run on natural uranium was considered a major benefit in the 1960s as it appeared the demand for enrichment would outstrip the supply. By the 1970s it was clear that fuel supplies were not going to be a problem, and the use of unenriched fuel was no longer a major design goal. Using slight enrichment leads to higher burnup and more economical fuel cycles, offsetting the now-low costs of enrichment.

The idea of using heavy water for the moderator and light water for the coolant was explored by a number of designs during this period. The Gentilly-1 Nuclear Generating Station in Quebec used the same solution, but this was not successful and shut down after a short lifetime. The Fugen Advanced Test Reactor in Japan suffered a similar fate. The Italian CIRENE design, hosted at Latina Nuclear Power Plant, was built but never commissioned. The last attempt to use this basic design was the modern Advanced CANDU Reactor of the early 2000s, but development ended without an example being built.
