= Greenfield status =

Decommissioning status

Greenfield status (also known as "unrestricted re-use") is an end point wherein a parcel of land that had been in industrial use is, in principle, restored to the conditions existing before the construction of the plant.

All power plants—whether coal, gas, and nuclear—have a finite life beyond which it is no longer economical to operate them. At that point they are decommissioned; that is, they are dismantled and their components are disposed, either by sale or scrapping. In some cases the buildings that housed the plant may be put to other uses. However, in many cases contamination is unacceptable, and the buildings are demolished. The land on which the plant operated also may have been polluted with high levels of toxins, and in this case other remedial measures like removal and replacement of the top soil or clay capping may be required to render the site safe in perpetuity.

It is becoming standard practice in many jurisdictions to mandate a return to greenfield status at the end of plant service as a condition of the initial site license, and potential licensees must demonstrate that steps will be taken to assure the availability of funds via the posting of a reclamation bond for that task before a site license will be issued. While this concept has mainly applied to the power generating industry, it is coming into wider use in other areas of industrial decommissioning.

== See also ==
- Brownfield status
- Environmental remediation
- Greenfield land
- Nuclear decommissioning
