= Reactorsaurus =

Reactorsaurus is a robot designed to deconstruct the defunct nuclear reactor at Dounreay in Caithness where the conditions have become too dangerous to work in due to neutron activation.

== Origin ==
The robot entered the design phase in 2008, soon after Dounreay Site Restoration Ltd (DSRL) began planning the site cleanup and facilities decommissioning (for more information on the recent history of the site cleanup, see here). Due to the nuclear contamination in the area, DSRL's goal was to create a "Reactor Dismantling Manipulator" capable of remote control for. DSRL outsourced engineers to design and model the robot, using 3D-modeling software from Imass with mechanical simulation software Autodesk Inventor and Ansys Design Space to hasten the testing process. Reactorsaurus' final version uses rails for locomotion and is fully remote-controlled, with multiple cameras and microphones to assist with navigation. It sports two extendable and retractable arms, each equipped with cameras and industrial cutting tools for precise demolition. With a total weight of 75 tonnes, the robot gained the nickname "Reactorsaurus" as news of its development circulated. Once completed, DSRL and its associated contractors used Reactorsaurus and other disposal tools to begin the deconstruction of the Prototype Fast Reactor (PFR). The PFR's initial deconstruction phase was considered complete by 2013, and its total deconstruction has been projected to finish before 2025.

While the site cleanup has made significant progress, the Nuclear Decommissioning authority estimates that Dounreay will remain uninhabitable until the year 2333.
