= Fugen Nuclear Power Plant =

Former nuclear test reactor in Japan

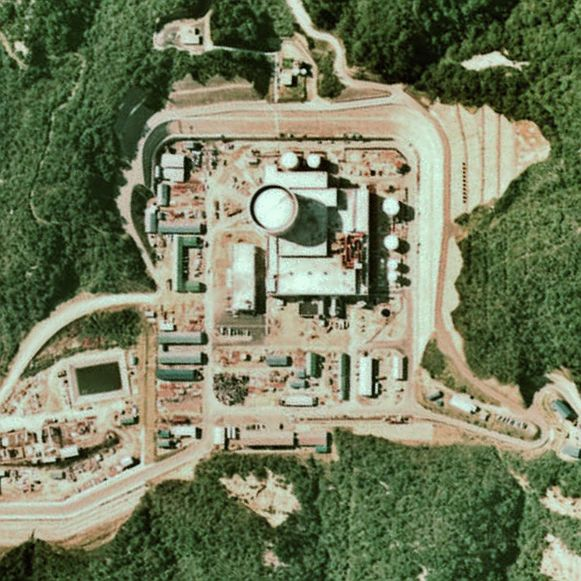
- The Fugen NPP in 1975, Image: Japan Ministry of Land, Infrastructure and Transport
- Country: Japan
- Coordinates: 35°45′16″N 136°00′59″E
- Status: Decommissioned
- Construction began: May 10, 1972
- Commission date: March 20, 1979
- Decommission date: March 29, 2003
- Operator: Japan Atomic Energy Agency

Nuclear power station
- Reactor type: HWLWR

Power generation
- Units decommissioned: 1 x 165 MW
- Nameplate capacity: 165 MW
- Capacity factor: 23.9%
- Annual net output: 345 GW·h

External links
- Website: www.jnc.go.jp/zfugen
- Commons: Related media on Commons

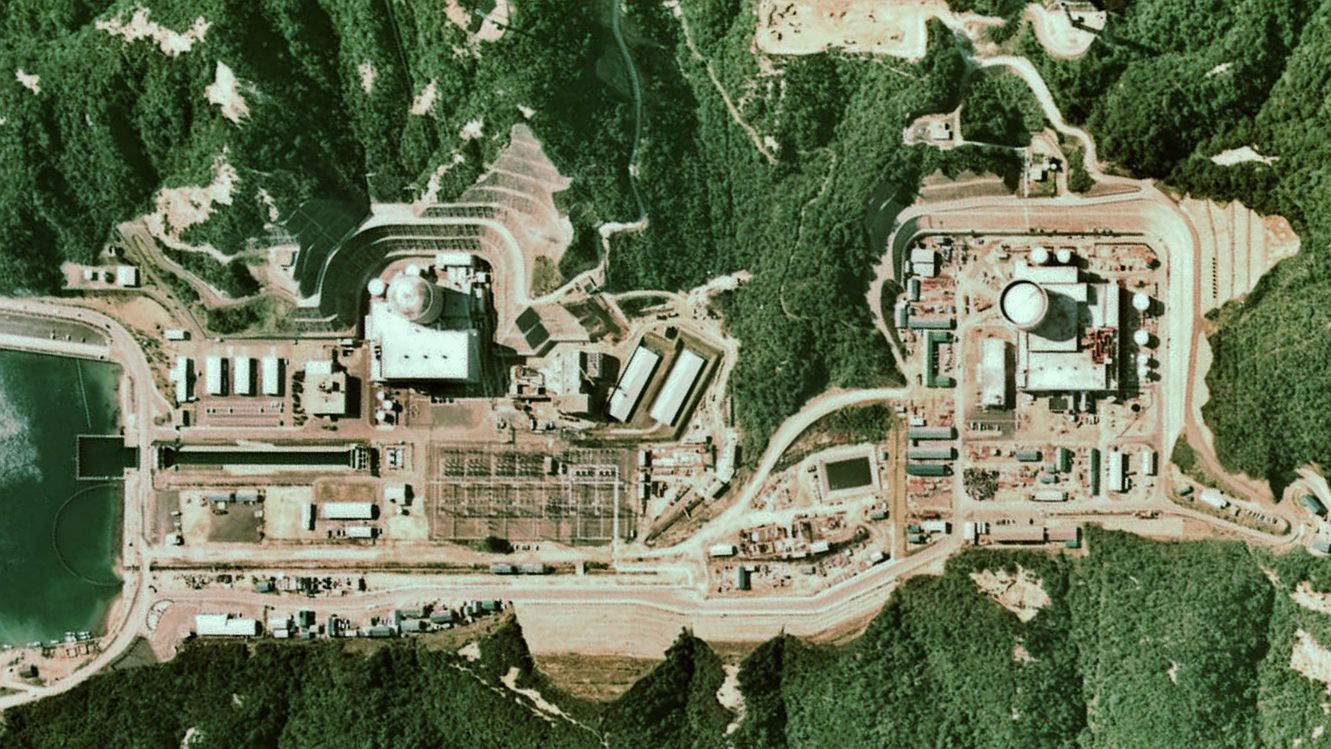
The Tsuruga NPP and Fugen NPP together in the same image

Fugen ふげん (Fugen) was a prototype Japanese nuclear test reactor. Fugen was a domestic Japanese design for a demonstration Advanced Thermal Reactor. It was a heavy water moderated, boiling light water cooled reactor. The reactor was started in 1979 and shut down in 2003. As of 2018, it is undergoing decommissioning. It is located in Myōjin-chō, in the city of Tsuruga, Fukui. The name "Fugen" is derived from Fugen Bosatsu (Samantabhadra), a Buddhist deity.

The reactor was the first in the world to use a full MOX fuel core. It had 772 assemblies, the most in the world. It has received the title of a historic landmark from the American Nuclear Society.

The design boils ordinary water like a boiling water reactor (BWR) but uses heavy water as a moderator as in a CANDU reactor. The electrical output was 165 MW and the thermal output was 557 MW.

- Core temperature: 300 °C
- Pellet centerline temperature: 2200 °C
- Fuel conversion time: 6 months

The plant is located on a site that covers 267,694 m^{2} (66 acres); buildings occupy 7,762 m^{2} (1.9 acres), and it has 46,488 m^{2} of floor space. It employed 256 workers.

== Accidents ==
- 14–16 April 1997: A tritium leakage was announced to the responsible authorities 30 hours after the event. During the following investigation it was shown that it already had 11 similar incidents. Five managers of the operator at that time (at the time Power Reactor and Nuclear Fuel Development Corporation) resigned.
- 8 April 2002: About 200 cubic meters of steam escaped from a defective pipe. The reactor was switched off.

During dismantling operations it was found that walls with controls did not have the necessary strength at 25 of 34 points.
