= SAFSTOR =

Options for nuclear decommissioning of a shut down plant in the United States

SAFSTOR is a nuclear decommissioning method in which a nuclear power plant or facility governed by the United States Nuclear Regulatory Commission, is "placed and maintained in a condition that allows the facility to be safely stored and subsequently decontaminated (deferred decontamination) to levels that permit release for unrestricted use".

During SAFSTOR the de-fuelled plant is monitored before complete decontamination and dismantling of the site, to a condition where nuclear licensing is no longer required. The decommissioning must be completed within 60 years of the plant ceasing operations.

During the storage interval, some of the radioactive contaminants of the reactor and power plant will decay, which will reduce the quantity of radioactive material to be removed during the final decontamination phase.

== Levels ==
Different sub-levels of SAFSTOR are recognized, which vary in the type of activity and monitoring required.

- In "hot/cold standby" the plant is kept in operating condition but not actively delivering power; monitoring and maintenance is similar to that during a long outage. This may be the first step to allow planning of further shutdown and decommissioning.
- In "custodial SAFSTOR" systems such as radiation monitoring and ventilation are kept in operation, along with continuous site security and maintenance. Minimal initial decontamination is done.
- "Passive SAFSTOR" requires a more thorough initial clean up, but allows only intermittent inspection of the site and shutdown of active systems such as radiation monitoring.
- "Hardened SAFSTOR" prevents intrusion on contaminated parts of the plant by substantial barriers.

All varieties of SAFSTOR require positive action to decontaminate the site at the end of the storage period.

== Alternative options ==
The other options set by the NRC are nuclear decommissioning which is immediate dismantling of the plant and remediation of the site, and nuclear entombment which is the enclosure of contaminated parts of the plant in a permanent layer of concrete. Mixtures of options may be used, for example, immediate removal of steam turbine components and condensers, and SAFSTOR for the more heavily radioactive containment vessel. Since NRC requires decommissioning to be completed within 60 years, ENTOMB is not usually chosen since not all activity will have decayed to an unregulated background level in that time.

Decommissioning options for a retired nuclear plant may be chosen based on availability of decommissioning funds, operation of other reactors at the same site, or availability of waste disposal facilities. In 2004, 11 reactors were planned for DECON and 9 for SAFSTOR. In 2008, 14 shutdown commercial power reactors were planned for or had completed DECON, 11 were in SAFSTOR, 3 were in ENTOMB and Three Mile Island unit 2 was defuelled and will be decontaminated when Unit 1 ceases operation.

== See also ==
- Environmental effects of nuclear power
- Nuclear power debate
