= Mihama Nuclear Power Plant =

Nuclear power plant in Fukui Prefecture, Japan

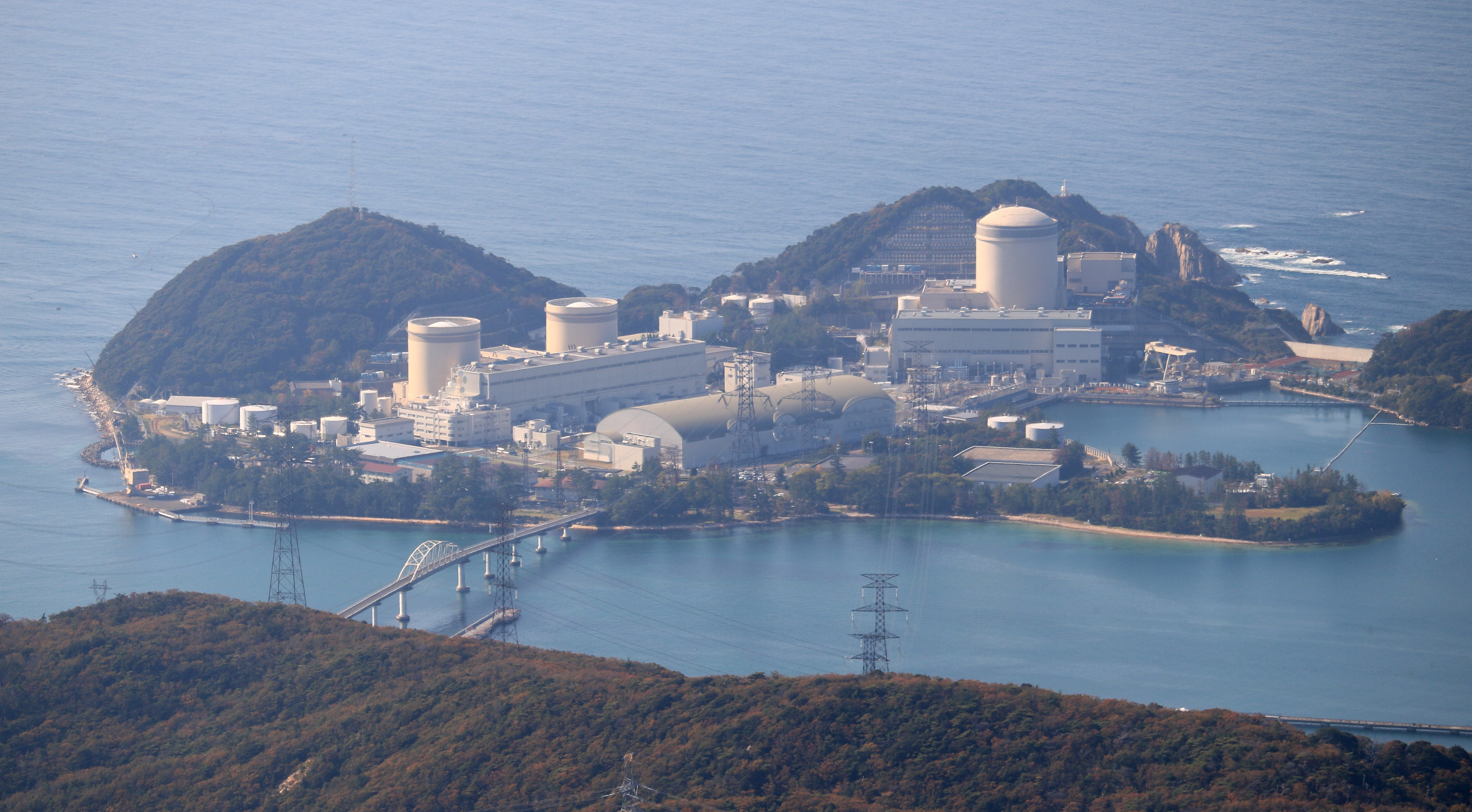
- Mihama Nuclear Power Plant
- Country: Japan
- Location: Mihama, Fukui Prefecture
- Coordinates: 35°42′12.51″N 135°57′48.88″E
- Status: Out of service
- Construction began: 1 February 1967
- Commission date: 28 November 1970
- Operator: The Kansai Electric Power Company, Inc.

Nuclear power station
- Reactor type: PWR
- Cooling source: Nyunoura bay, Sea of Japan

Power generation
- Units operational: 1 x 780 MW
- Units decommissioned: 1 x 320 MW; 1 x 470 MW
- Nameplate capacity: 780 MW
- Capacity factor: 0%
- Annual net output: 0 GW·h

External links
- Website: www.kepco.co.jp/wakasa/mihama/mihama.html
- Commons: Related media on Commons

The Mihama Nuclear Power Plant (美浜発電所, Mihama hatsudensho; Mihama NPP) is operated by The Kansai Electric Power Company, Inc. and is in the town of Mihama, Fukui Prefecture, about 320 km west of Tokyo. It is on a site that is 520,000 m^{2} of which 60% is green space. Mihama - 1 was commissioned in 1970.

== Reactors on site ==
Kansai Electric Power Mihama Nuclear Power Plant across the bay, Mihama

Unit	Reactor type	Average electric output (net)	Electric power rating (gross)	Beginning of construction	First criticality	Commission date	Decommission date
Mihama - 1	PWR	320 MW	340 MW	1 February 1967	8 August 1970	28 November 1970	March 2015
Mihama - 2	PWR	470 MW	500 MW	29 May 1968	21 April 1972	25 July 1972	March 2015
Mihama - 3	PWR	780 MW	826 MW	7 August 1972	19 February 1976	1 December 1976	

== Accidents ==
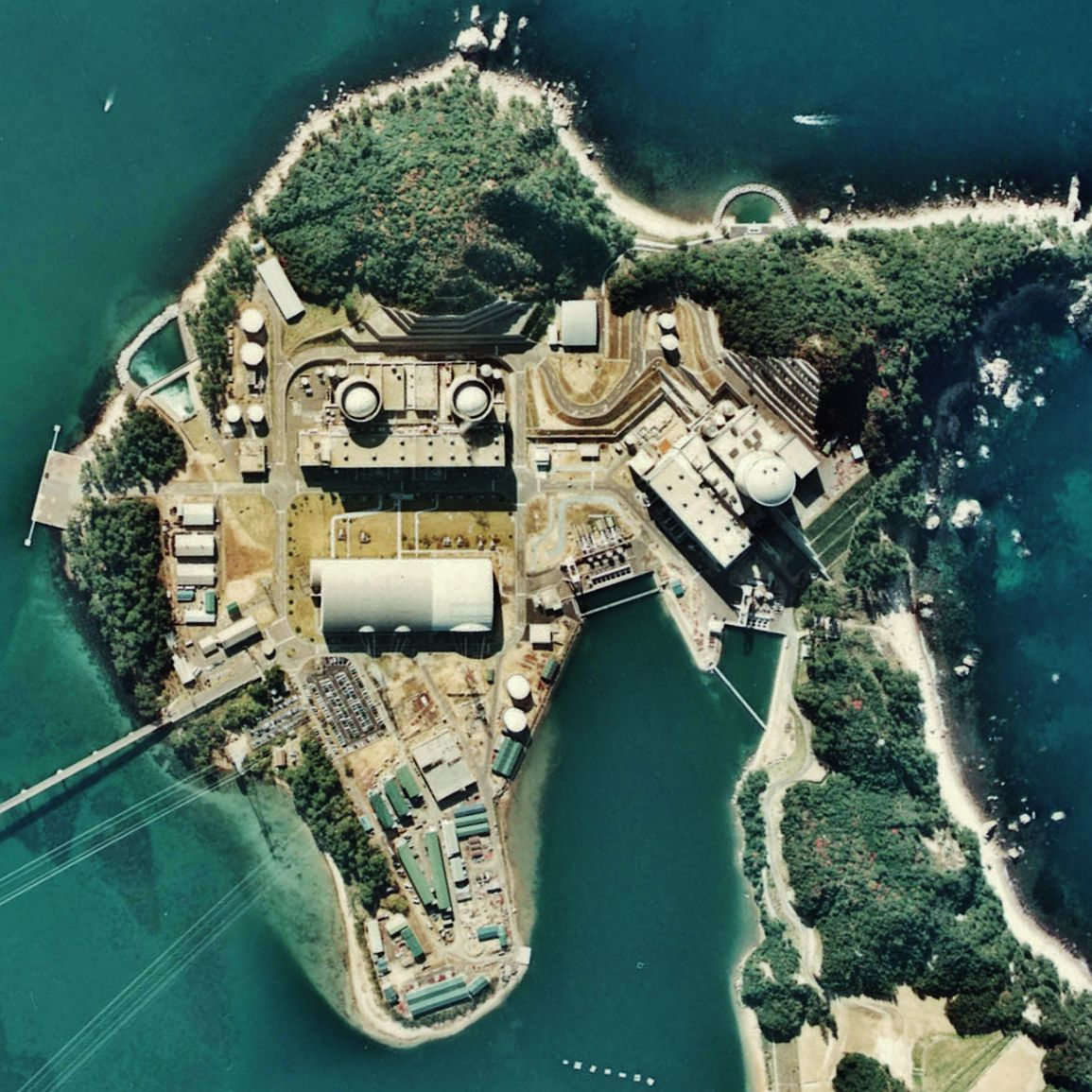
Aerial view of the plant from 1975. Image: Japan Ministry of Land, Infrastructure and Transport

=== 1991 accident ===
On 9 February 1991, a tube in the steam generator of Unit 2 ruptured. This triggered a SCRAM with full activation of the Emergency Core Cooling System. The ensuing investigation showed that a fixture designed to suppress vibration to the heat-transfer tube had not been inserted as far as it was designed to be, resulting in abnormal vibrations of the tube. The high cycle fatigue, repeated over 100,000 times, led to the pipe rupturing. Eventually, a negligible amount of radiation was released to the environment.

=== 2004 accident ===
On 9 August 2004, an accident occurred in a building housing turbines for the Mihama 3 reactor. Hot water and steam leaking from a broken pipe killed five workers and resulted in six others being injured. The accident, rated at INES Level 0, had been called Japan's worst accident at a nuclear plant before the crisis at Fukushima I Nuclear Power Plant. The nuclear section was not affected (the turbines housing building is separate from the reactor building).

The Mihama 3 is an 826 MWe, 3-loop Westinghouse type pressurized water reactor (PWR) which has been in service since 1976. The pipe rupture occurred in a 55.9 centimetres (22.0 in) outside diameter pipe in the 'A' loop condensate system between the fourth feedwater heater and the deaerator, downstream of an orifice for measuring single-phase water flow. At the time of the secondary piping rupture, 105 workers were preparing for periodic inspections to commence.

A review of plant parameters did not uncover any precursor indicators before the accident nor were there any special operations that could have caused the pipe rupture. An investigation concluded that water quality had been maintained since the commissioning of the plant, however the failing pipe had been omitted from an initial inspection plan and quality management systems were ineffective. Mihama-3 restarted in January 2007 after making changes to "reestablish a safety culture" within KEPCO and obtaining permission from Fukui Prefecture and industry regulators.

== Court actions against restarting nuclear power plants ==
In August 2011 citizens of the Shiga Prefecture, at the banks of Lake Biwa, filed a lawsuit at the Otsu District Court, seeking a court order to prevent the restart of seven reactors operated by Kansai Electric Power Company, in the prefecture Fukui. Otsu District Court agreed only to stop the Takahama units.

In March 2017, the Osaka High Court quashed the Otsu District Court injunction stopping the Takahama units.

== Seismic research in 2011 and 2012 ==
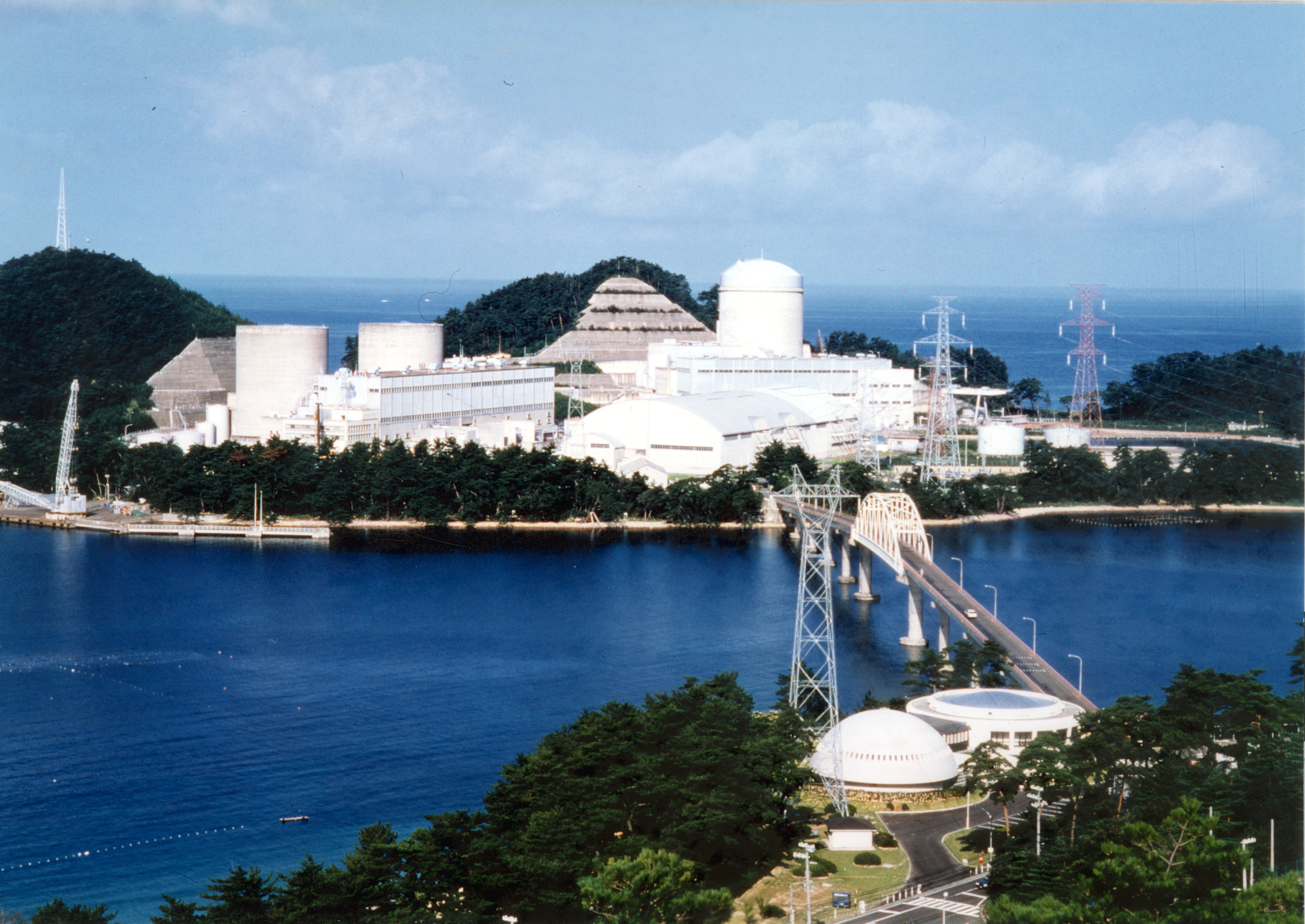
Mihama in 2007

On 5 March 2012 a group of seismic researchers revealed the possibility of a 7.4 M (or stronger) earthquake under the Tsuruga Nuclear Power Plant. Before this date the Japanese governmental Earthquake Research Committee and Japan Atomic Power had calculated that the Urasoko fault under the plant, combined with other faults connected to it, was around 25 km long and could cause a 7.2M quake and a 1.7 meter displacement. On top of this, the presence of the oceanic faults were not taken into account by NISA and JAP in the assessment of the safety of the Tsuruga nuclear power plant.

Analysis of sonic survey and other data provided by Japan Atomic Power analysed by a panel of experts of the Nuclear and Industrial Safety Agency showed the presence of multiple faults existing within 2 to 3 km from the Urasoko fault. According to Sugiyama, a member of this group of scientists, these faults were highly likely to be activated together, and this would extend the length of the Urasoko fault to 35 km.

Computer simulations calculating the length of a fault based on its displacement showed the Urasoko fault to be 39 km long, a result close to the length estimated by the sonic survey data, and the fault could cause some five meters of displacement when activated together with other faults.

Yuichi Sugiyama, the leader of this research group of the National Institute of Advanced Industrial Science and Technology, warned that, as other faults on the south side of the Urasoko fault could become activated together, "The worst-case scenario should be taken into consideration."

According to the experts there were many other faults located under one reactor on the west side of the Urasoku fault that could move also simultaneously. If this were confirmed, the location of the Tsuruga nuclear plant would be disqualified.

On 6 March 2012 NISA asked Japan Atomic Power Co. to reassess the worst-case scenario for earthquakes at the Tsuruga Nuclear Power Plant. They were to find out what damage this could do to the buildings on the site, because the Urazoko fault, running around 250 meters from the reactor buildings, could have a serious impact on the earthquake resistance of the power plant. NISA was also planning to send similar instructions to two other nuclear power plant operators in the Fukui area: Kansai Electric Power Company, and Japan Atomic Energy Agency. The Mihama Nuclear Power Plant and the Monju fast-breeder reactor could also be affected by a possible earthquake caused by the Urazoko fault.

== Unit 1 and 2 shutdown ==
Regulation brought about following the March 2011 nuclear disaster forbids the operation of nuclear reactors for more than 40 years. However, plant operators could secure a 20-year operation extension from the Nuclear Regulation Authority if reactors are refitted. For example, these new regulations require utilities to install power cables made from fire-retardant materials.

Kansai Electric determined that it was not economical to invest in the costly refits of the two older reactor units (Mihama 1 and 2) given their comparatively small output, and decommissioned them in March 2015.

== Unit 3 life extension to 60 years ==
Japan's nuclear regulator approved an application to extend the life of Unit 3 through 2036. New regulations would have required the shutdown of Unit 3 by the end of 2016. This is the second such approval granted since the Fukushima disaster.

Restart will happen after safety upgrades are completed by March 2020 and will cost about 165 billion yen ($1.51 billion). The upgrades involve fire proofing cabling and other measures.

On 23 June 2021, unit 3 was powered. The restart of unit 3 marks the country's first nuclear unit to operate beyond the initial 40-year service period and following a 10-year outage, completing the mandated upgrade works and the final inspections. But unit 3 is expected to be halted for completion of counterterrorism measures before a 25 October deadline. Work is in progress, but Kansai Electric estimates it would not meet the deadline. Furthermore, nine people from Fukui, Kyoto and Shiga prefectures, filed a lawsuit with the Osaka District Court, seeking to stop unit 3.

== See also ==
- List of nuclear power plants in Japan
