= Monju Nuclear Power Plant =

Closed nuclear power plant in Japan

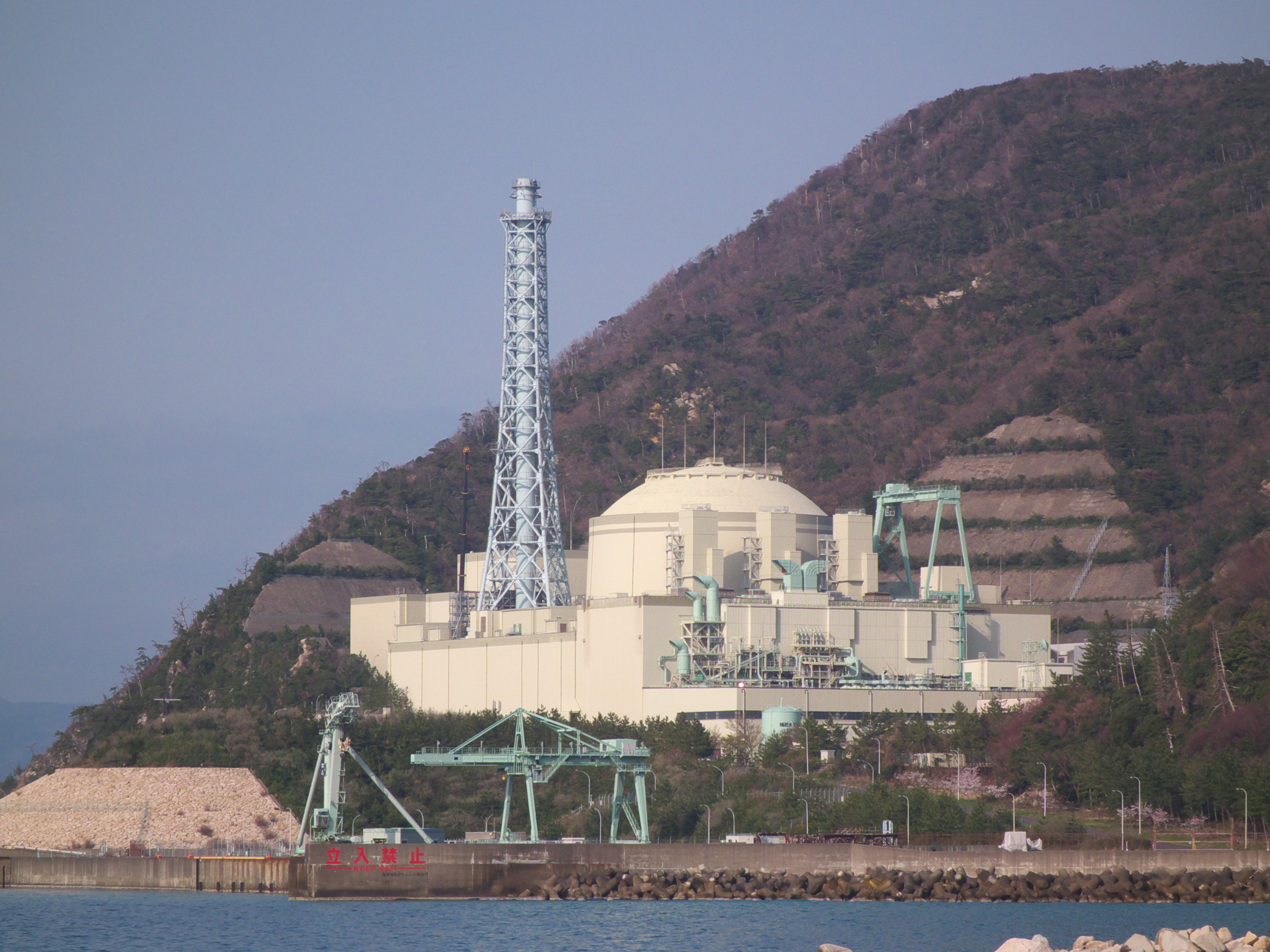
- Monju Nuclear Power Plant
- Official name: もんじゅ
- Country: Japan
- Location: Tsuruga, Fukui Prefecture
- Coordinates: 35°44′25″N 135°59′17″E
- Status: Being decommissioned
- Construction began: May 10, 1986
- Commission date: August 29, 1995; May 6, 2010 (reactivated)
- Decommission date: December 8, 1995 (suspended for 15 years)
- Operator: Japan Atomic Energy Agency

Nuclear power station
- Reactor type: FBR

Power generation
- Units decommissioned: 1 × 280 MW
- Nameplate capacity: 280 MW

External links
- Website: www.jaea.go.jp/04/turuga/mext-monju/index.html
- Commons: Related media on Commons

Monju (もんじゅ) was a Japanese sodium-cooled fast reactor, located near the Tsuruga Nuclear Power Plant, Fukui Prefecture. Its name is a reference to Manjusri. Construction started in 1986 and the reactor achieved criticality for the first time in April 1994. The reactor has been inoperative for most of the time since it was originally built. It was last operated in 2010 and is now closed.

Monju was a sodium cooled, MOX-fueled, loop-type reactor with three primary coolant loops, designed to produce 280 MWe from 714 MWt. It had a breeding ratio of approximately 1.2. The plant is located on a site that spans 1.08 km^{2} (267 acres), the buildings occupy 28,678 m^{2} (7 acres), and it has 104,680 m^{2} of floor space.

An accident in December 1995, in which a sodium leak caused a major fire, forced a shutdown. A subsequent scandal involving a cover-up of the scope of the accident delayed its restart until May 6, 2010, with renewed criticality reached on May 8, 2010. In August 2010 another accident, involving dropped machinery, shut down the reactor again. As of June 2011, the reactor had only generated electricity for one hour since its first testing two decades prior. As of the end of 2010, total funds spent on the reactor amounted to ¥1.08 trillion. An estimated ¥160–170 billion would be needed to continue to operate the reactor for another 10 years. As of 2014, the plant had cost ¥1 trillion ($9.8 billion).

A final decision on the project (e.g. to decommission or extend funding) was due by end 2016, and a decision to close the facility was made in December 2016. In December 2017 the Japan Atomic Energy Agency applied for approval of its decommissioning plan by the Nuclear Regulation Authority. Decommissioning and dismantling are planned to be completed by 2047 and is expected to cost ¥375 billion.

== History ==
=== 1995 sodium leak and fire ===
On December 8, 1995, the reactor suffered an accident rated level 1 on the International Nuclear Event Scale (INES). Intense vibration caused a thermowell inside a pipe carrying sodium coolant to break, possibly at a defective weld point, allowing several hundred kilograms of sodium to leak out onto the floor below the pipe. Upon contact with air, the liquid sodium reacted with oxygen and moisture in the air, filling the room with caustic fumes and producing temperatures of several hundred degrees Celsius. The heat was so intense that it warped several steel structures in the room. An alarm sounded around 7:30 p.m., switching the system over to manual operations, but a full operational shutdown was not ordered until around 9:00 p.m., after the fumes were detected. When investigators located the source of the spill they found as much as three tons of solidified sodium.

The leak occurred in the plant's secondary cooling system, so the sodium was not radioactive. However, there was massive public outrage in Japan when it was revealed that Power Reactor and Nuclear Fuel Development Corporation (PNC), the semi-governmental agency then in charge of Monju, had tried to cover up the extent of the accident and resulting damage. This coverup included falsifying reports and the editing of a videotape taken immediately after the accident, as well as issuing a gag order that aimed to stop employees revealing that tapes had been edited.

The official in charge of investigating the coverup, Shigeo Nishimura, committed suicide by leaping from the roof of a Tokyo hotel. Nishimura was deputy general manager of the general affairs department of the Power Reactor and the Nuclear Fuel Development Corporation, the Government concern that ran the country's prototype fast-breeder reactor. Officials said Nishimura was not involved in the cover-up but was distressed by evidence he had unearthed.

=== 2010 restart ===
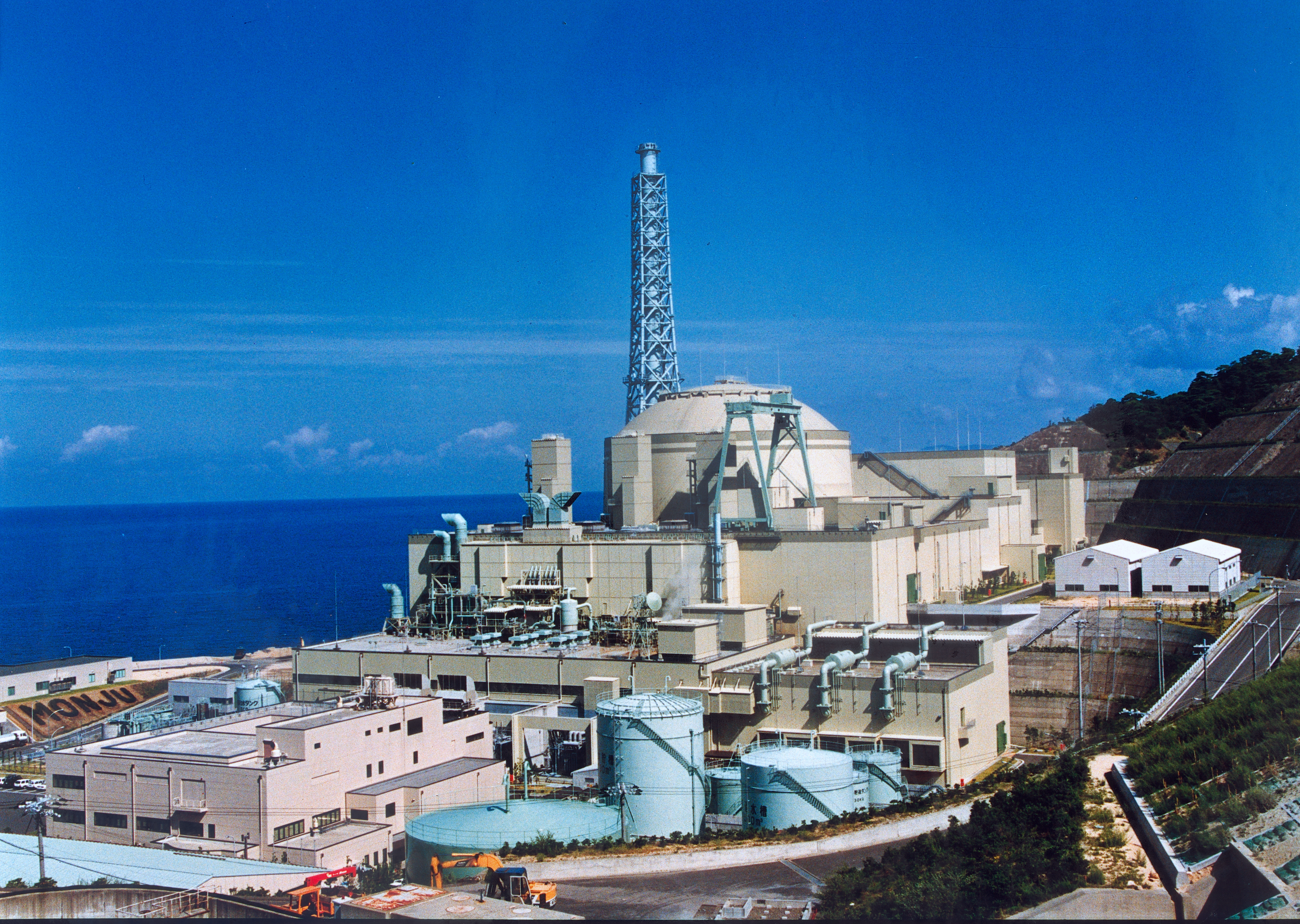
Monju in 2007

On November 24, 2000, Japan Atomic Energy Agency announced their intention to restart the Monju reactor. This decision was met with resistance by the public, resulting in a series of court battles. On January 27, 2003, the Nagoya High Court's Kanazawa branch made a ruling reversing its earlier 1983 approval to build the reactor, but then on May 30, 2005, Japan's Supreme Court gave the green light to reopen the Monju reactor.

The nuclear fuel was replaced for the restart. The original fuel loaded was mixed plutonium-uranium oxide with plutonium content of around 15–20%, but by 2009, due to natural radioactive decay, the fuel had only half of the original plutonium-241 content. This made achieving criticality impossible, requiring fuel replacement.

The restart was scheduled for October 2008, having been moved back five months. A restart date of February 2009 was again delayed due to the discovery of holes in the reactor's auxiliary building; in August 2009 it was announced that restart might be in February 2010.

In February 2010, JAEA obtained official approval to restart the reactor from the Japanese Government. The restart was definitely scheduled for the end of March. In late February, JAEA requested Fukui Prefecture and Tsuruga City for deliberations aimed at resuming test operation. Having obtained the go ahead from both entities, JAEA started criticality testing, after which it took some months before commercial operation could resume – as for any new nuclear plant.

Operators started withdrawing control rods on May 6, 2010, marking the restart of the plant. The Fukui Prefecture governor, Issei Nishikawa asked the METI for additional stimulus to the prefecture including an expansion of the Shinkansen in turn for the restart of the plant. Monju achieved criticality on May 8, at 10:36 AM JST. Test runs were to continue until 2013, at which point the reactor could have started to feed power into the electric grid, beginning "full fledged" operation.

=== 2010 "In‐Vessel Transfer Machine" falling accident ===
On August 26, 2010, a 3.3-tonne "In‐Vessel Transfer Machine" fell into the reactor vessel when being removed after a scheduled fuel replacement operation. On October 13, 2010, an unsuccessful attempt was made to retrieve the machine. The JAEA tried to recover the device used in fuel exchange but failed as it had become misshaped, preventing its retrieval through the upper lid.

The JAEA began preparatory engineering work on May 24, 2011 to set up equipment to be used to retrieve the IVTM that fell inside the vessel. The fallen device was successfully retrieved from the reactor vessel on June 23, 2011.

=== 2012 sodium-heater failure ===
On Sunday 2 June 2012 the sodium heater, which keeps the sodium molten as a secondary coolant, ceased operating for half an hour from about 4:30 p.m. The power supply was checked, but insufficient information in the service manual caused the heater to stop, causing a fall of about 40 C from 200 C of the sodium temperature. Under the internal rules of JAEA, the failure was regarded a too minor incident to report it to the authorities, but the next day the Nuclear Regulation Authority and local governments were informed about the incident. However it was not made public.

=== 2013 new director of the JAEA appointed ===
On 31 May 2013 science and technology minister Hakubun Shimomura announced that Shojiro Matsuura, (77 years) the former chairman of the Nuclear Safety Commission, would be the next president of JAEA on Monday 3 June. In this function he would reorganize the JAEA, with safety as a top priority.

Former functions of Matsuura:

- November 1998 President, JAERI (After experience as Vice President)
- April 2000 Chairman, Nuclear Safety Commission

Present functions:

- November 2012 Chairman, Japan Nuclear Safety Institute
- June 2013 President, Japan Atomic Energy Agency

=== Omitted safety inspections ===
During safety inspections conducted by the NRA between 3 and 21 June 2013, it was revealed that the safety inspections on another 2,300 pieces of equipment had been omitted by JAEA. In 2014 more uninspected equipment was discovered, and more than 100 improper corrections to inspection records found, leading to concerns that inspection reports were being falsified. Again in 2015 it was discovered that regular degradation assessments measuring the thickness of sodium cooling pipes had not been carried out since 2007.

=== Further incidents ===
On 16 February 2012 NISA reported that a sodium-detector malfunctioned. About 3 p.m local time the alarm went off. Additionally, a ventilator that should cool a pipe stopped. According to NISA no leakage was found, and there was no damage to the environment. Repairs were planned.

On 30 April 2013 an operating error rendered two of the three emergency generators unusable. During the monthly testing of the emergency diesel generators, staff forgot to close six of the twelve valves they had opened before testing, releasing thick black smoke. JAERI reported it to the Nuclear Regulation Authority as a breach of security regulations.

On Monday 16 September 2013 before 3 a.m. the data transmission of the reactor stopped to the government's Emergency Response Support System. Whether this was caused by Typhoon Man-yi, the powerful typhoon that went through Japan that day, was unknown. At that moment it was not possible to restore the connection, because the reactor site in Tsuruga was inaccessible due to mudslides and fallen trees caused by the typhoon.

On August 3, 2016, it was discovered that an alert triggered on November 19, 2015, when the quality of the water in a spent nuclear fuel rod pool deteriorated, was ignored until April 2016 and rectified only the next month.

== Developments since Fukushima-Daiichi accident in March 2011 ==
In September 2011 the ministry of education, science and technology asked for the fiscal year of 2012 only 20 to 30 percent of the budget to maintain and manage the Monju reactor for the year 2011. The uncertainty about Japan's future energy policy caused the ministry to conclude that the project could not proceed.

The test run of the reactor, in which the reactor's output would be raised to 40 percent of its capacity by the end of March 2012, was postponed on September 29, 2011, by the Japanese Government because the uncertainty over the future of nuclear energy. After the accident in Fukushima, the Atomic Energy Commission of Japan made a start with a review of Japan's long term energy policy. An outline of this policy would be published within 12 months. On September 30, officials of the Science and Technology ministry explained their decision not to start the test run at meetings in the city of Tsuruga and Fukui Prefecture.

The local Fukui edition of the Asahi Shinbun reported on June 22, 2012 that the reactor would restart in July 2012.

After it was revealed in November 2012, that regular safety checks had been omitted, the Nuclear Regulation Authority ordered JAEA to change its maintenance rules and inspection plans. JAEA had failed to perform periodical safety checks on nearly 10,000 out of 39,000 pieces of equipment at the plant before the deadlines were met. Half May 2013 not all details were worked out, and under the rules set by the NRA, it was not allowed to change nuclear fuel rods or move the control rods. Therefore, the restart of the reactor was not permitted.

On 16 May 2013 the NRA ordered JAEA President Atsuyuki Suzuki to comply with their decisions and planned a meeting on 23 May to explain their reasoning, making it very likely that the NRA would block the reactivation of the reactor. In reaction to this Suzuki told reporters, "It takes nearly one year for preparation and it is physically quite difficult (to restart the reactor before March 2013)." Because the criticism of the NRA on the sloppy safety controls Atsuyuki Suzuki resigned as President of JAEC on 17 May. Although the resignation was accepted by the government, the move was a surprise, because on May 16 Susuki had spoken on a meeting in the Japanese parliament, the Diet, and to the NRA secretariat and had pleaded to restore the public's trust in the JAEC. The NRA commented, that Suzuki's resignation had not solved fundamental problems and that there was a need to restructure the JAEA as an organization.

Suzuki (born 1942) was an authority on the nuclear fuel cycle, and became President of the JAEA in August 2010. Before this he was a professor at the University of Tokyo and the chairman of the former Nuclear Safety Commission. Yonezo Tsujikura, vice president of the JAEA, served as acting president until a successor was chosen.

At the end of the fiscal year 2011, a budget of US$29 million was requested to continue the Monju project. This money would cover the costs of maintenance and the costs of the test run, planned in the summer of 2012. On 20 November a seven-member Japanese government commission decided that the future of the Monju reactor should be thoroughly reviewed before a decision could be made for this 2012 budget. Some members of the commission thought that there would be little public support for restarting the fast breeder project, and that it was uncertain that the reactor could be taken into commercial service in 2050 as originally planned. Other members said that the Monju project should be stopped completely, and that all efforts should be put into the international fusion reactor project ITER instead. Decisions about the 2012 budget would be taken after the discussions in a panel of cabinet members about the nuclear policy of Japan, including the fast breeder reactor project, would be complete.

Reports in 2012 indicated that plans to generate electricity at Monju would be abandoned, and the plant repurposed into a research centre for handling spent nuclear fuel.

On 29 May 2013, the NRA announced that JAEA was prohibited from restarting the fast breeder reactor, describing the safety culture at the plant as "deteriorated", because the problems at the plant were not addressed, and the staff were aware of the delayed inspections. The NRA said that before it could plan a restart of the reactor, JAEA must allocate appropriate funds and human resources to rebuild a maintenance and management system to prevent the recurrence of coolant leakages and other problems. The NRA also announced that an assessment would be made of whether geologic faults at the location of the Monju facility are active. It had similar plans for surveys at six facilities all over Japan.

On 2 March 2015 Noboru Hirose, a senior NRA official, told NHK at the beginning of a 3-week regular safety check that he could not say when test runs would be permitted to start. He would first need to examine how safety checks are conducted and whether adequate measures are in place to avoid a repeat of earlier problems. JAEA had hoped the ban would be lifted by the end of March 2015.

== Seismic research in 2011, 2012 and 2013 ==
On 5 March 2012 a group of seismic researchers revealed the possibility of a 7.4M (or even more potent) earthquake under the Tsuruga Nuclear Powerplant. Before this date the Japanese governmental Earthquake Research Committee and Japan Atomic Power had calculated that the Urasoko fault under the plant, combined with other faults connected to it, was around 25 km long. and could cause a 7.2M quake and a 1.7 meter displacement. On top of this, the presence of the oceanic faults were not taken into account by NISA and JAP in the assessment of the safety of the Tsuruga nuclear power plant.

Analysis of sonic survey and other data provided by Japan Atomic Power analysed by a panel of experts of Nuclear and Industrial Safety Agency showed the presence of multiple faults existing within 2 to 3 km from the Urasoko fault. According to Sugiyama, a member of this group of scientists, these faults were highly likely to be activated together, and this would extend the length of the Urasoko fault to 35 km.

Computer simulations calculating the length of a fault based on its displacement, showed the Urasoko fault to be 39 km long, a result close to the length estimated by the sonic survey data, and the fault could cause some 5 meter displacement when activated together with other faults.

Yuichi Sugiyama, the leader of this research group of the National Institute of Advanced Industrial Science and Technology, warned that – as other faults on the south side of the Urasoko fault could become activated together – "The worst case scenario should be taken into consideration"

According to the experts there were many other faults located under one reactor on the west side of the Urasoku fault that could move also simultaneously. If this would be confirmed, the location of the Tsuruga nuclear plant would be disqualified.

On 6 March 2012 NISA asked Japan Atomic Power Co. to reassess the worst-case scenario for earthquakes at the Tsuruga Nuclear Power Plant. What damage this could do to the buildings on the site, because the Urazoko fault, running around 250 meters from the reactor buildings, could have a serious impact on the earthquake resistance of the power plant. NISA was also planning to send similar instructions to two other nuclear power plant operators in the Fukui area: Kansai Electric Power Company, and Japan Atomic Energy Agency. Because the Mihama Nuclear Power Plant and the Monju fast breeder reactor could also be affected by a possible earthquake caused by the Urazoko fault.

On 17 July 2013 a commission of five experts led by NRA commissioner Kunihiko Shimazaki started the investigations on the geological activity of 8 zones of crushed rock under the reactor. Whether these old faults could move in conjunction with the active fault situated half a kilometer from the reactor site, and would constitute a hazard for the reactor safety. One of the experts, Chiba University professor Takahiro Miyauchi, did not take part in the two-day survey, but would visit the site afterwards. On Thursday 18 July Kunihiko Shimazaki told reporters, that his team could not yet reach a conclusion, further research was needed. Another acoustic survey of the grounds was planned by Japan Atomic Energy Agency and a geological examination to determine the age of the clay and stones in the faults. This could take a couple of months to finish, The assessment was planned at the end of August 2013.

== Decommissioning plans ==
On 21 October 2011 the Japanese government appointed a commission to study ways to cut wasteful expenditures, one possibility being decommissioning the Monju prototype fast breeder reactor. The Government Revitalization Unit took up this issue, because the calls to abolish this reactor were growing after the nuclear accident at Fukushima. As the accident at the Fukushima Daiichi power plant made it difficult, if not impossible, to build new nuclear power plants, the government panel would also review subsidies for localities with atomic power plants as well as functions of related entities such as the Japan Atomic Energy Agency.

On 27 November, after a visit to the plant, nuclear disaster minister Goshi Hosono said that scrapping the Monju-fast-breeder reactor was an option that would be given serious thought. Politicians and private sector experts of the ruling Democratic Party of Japan made proposals for a thorough operational and budgetary review in the government's energy policy screening session earlier in the week before his visit.

On 21 December 2016, the Japanese government confirmed the closure and decommissioning of the Monju reactor, with the suggestion that this would cost at least ¥375 billion. The decommissioning of Monju is planned to take 30 years. The Japanese regulator, the Nuclear Regulation Authority, accepted the plan in March 2018. The phases of the plan are:

1. transfer spent fuel to on-site storage pool by 2022 (completed 13 October 2022)
2. liquid sodium coolant extracted
3. equipment dismantled
4. reactor building demolished and removed by 2047

== Other FBR programs in Japan ==
Despite its intention to close the Monju facility, the Cabinet appeared to reaffirm its commitment to a fast breeder program of some kind, essential if Japan's stockpile of some 50 tonnes of plutonium is to be disposed of.

Jōyō is a test fast breeder reactor located in Ōarai, Ibaraki. The reactor was built in the 1970s for the purpose of experimental tests and the development of FBR technologies.

The successor to Monju was expected to be a larger demonstration plant to be completed around 2025, built by the newly formed Mitsubishi FBR Systems company. However, in 2014 Japan agreed to cooperate in developing the emergency reactor cooling system, and in a few other areas, with the French ASTRID demonstration sodium-cooled fast breeder reactor, which was subsequently cancelled in August 2019. As of 2016, France was seeking the full involvement of Japan in the ASTRID development.

== See also ==
- Fast-neutron reactor
- Nuclear power in Japan
- Sanshiro Kume
