= Mitsubishi APWR =

Japanese nuclear reactor design

The Mitsubishi advanced pressurized water reactor (APWR) is a generation III nuclear reactor design developed by Mitsubishi Heavy Industries (MHI) based on pressurized water reactor technology. It features several design enhancements including a neutron reflector, improved efficiency and improved safety systems. It has safety features advanced over the last generation, including a combination of passive and active systems. None are currently under construction.

== History ==
The standard APWR is going through the licensing process in Japan and two (of 1538 MWe) are being constructed at the Tsuruga plant. The next APWR+ will be of a 1700 MWe power and have full MOX core abilities.

The US-APWR was developed by MHI to modify their APWR design to comply with US regulations. TXU selected the US-APWR for use at multiple sites, including the Comanche Peak Nuclear Generating Station. However, in 2013, Mitsubishi slowed U.S. certification work, and the application to build two units at Comanche was suspended.

The reactors are intended for use in nuclear power plants to produce nuclear power from nuclear fuel.

== Plant parameters ==
Comparison of APWR plant
	APWR	EU-APWR	US-APWR
References			
Electric Power	1,538 MWe	1,700 MWe	1,700 MWe
Core Thermal Power	4,666 MWt	4,451 MWt	4,451 MWt
Reactor Fuel Assemblies	257	257	257
Reactor Fuel	17x17, 12 ft.	Advanced 17x17, 14 ft.	Advanced 17x17, 14 ft.
Active Core Length	3.6 meters	4.2 meters	4.2 meters
Coolant System Loops	4	4	4
Coolant Flow			7.64 m^{3}/s/loop
Coolant Pressure			15.5 MPa
Steam Generator Type	70F-1		90TT-1
Number of Steam Generators	4	4	4
Reactor Coolant Pump Type	100A	100A	100A
Number of Reactor Coolant Pumps	4	4	4
Reactor Coolant Pump Motor Output			6 MWe

The US-APWR has several design features to improve plant economics. The core is surrounded by a steel neutron reflector which increases reactivity and saves ~0.1wt% U-235 enrichment. In addition, the US-APWR uses more advanced steam generators (compared to the APWR) which creates drier steam allowing for the use of higher efficiency (and more delicate) turbines. This leads to a ~10% efficiency increase compared to the APWR.

Several safety improvements are also notable. The safety systems have enhanced redundancy, utilizing 4 trains each capable of supplying 50% of the needed high pressure makeup water instead of 2 trains capable of 100%. Also, more reliance is placed on the accumulators which have been redesigned and increased in size. The improvements in this passive system have led to the elimination of the Low Pressure Safety Injection system, an active system.

== Units ==
List of operational, planned, and closed APWR installations
Power plants			Reactor			Status	Notes	Ref
Unit	Location	Geolocation	Model	Ver	Gen	Status	Notes	Ref
Tsuruga 3	Japan		APWR		III	Planned		
Tsuruga 4	Japan		APWR		III	Planned		
Comanche 3	United States		APWR	US	III	Planned		
Comanche 4	United States		APWR	US	III	Planned		
North Anna 3	United States		APWR	US	III	Planned		

=== Planned ===
In 2013, plans to build units in the U.S. were suspended:

- TXUs Comanche Peak Nuclear Generating Station
- North Anna Nuclear Generating Station unit 3

On 10 May 2011, Japanese Prime Minister Naoto Kan announced that Japan was cancelling plans for new nuclear construction, including the two proposed new APWR reactors at Tsuruga Nuclear Power Plant. As of 2014, under a new government, plans for Tsuruga were uncertain. In March 2015 the Nuclear Regulation Authority (NRA) accepted an expert report that concluded Tsuruga is on an active geological fault.

== See also ==
- Atmea
- Mitsubishi FBR Systems
- AP1000, the Westinghouse nuclear power plant
