= JCO =

JCO as an acronym may stand for:

- JCO (company), a Japanese nuclear fuel cycle company involved in the Tokaimura nuclear accident
- Jamaican Caves Organisation
- Jewish Combat Organization, a Jewish resistance group during World War II
- Journal of Clinical Oncology, a medical journal
- Joyce Carol Oates, American author
- Junior commissioned officer, a group of military ranks in the armies of India, Pakistan, and Bangladesh
- Junkers, a former German aircraft manufacturer
