= Vandellòs =

- Vandellòs town
- Vandellòs i l'Hospitalet de l'Infant municipality
- Vandellòs Nuclear Power Plant
