= Tokaimura nuclear accidents =

1997 and 1999 Tōkai nuclear plant events

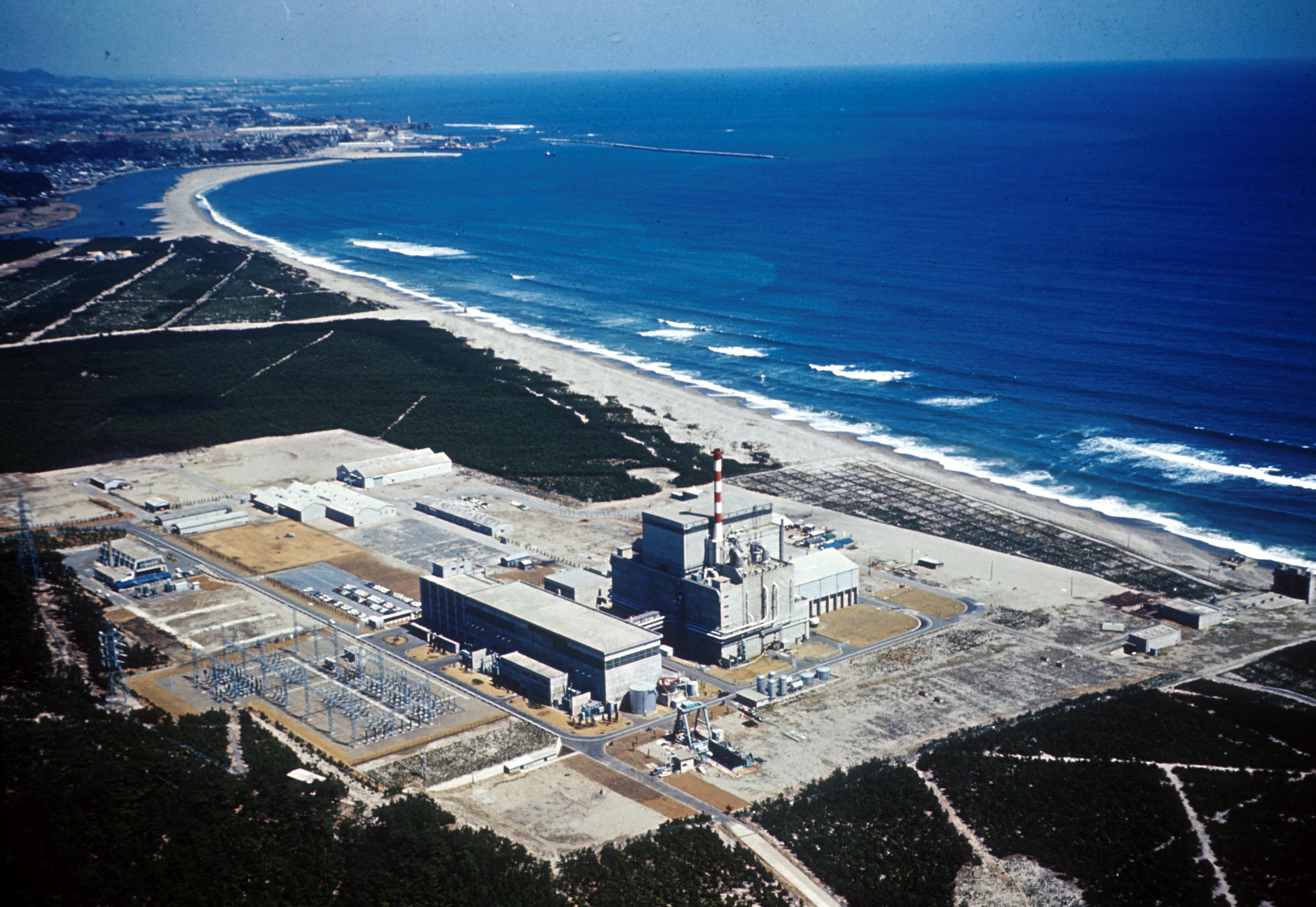
Tokai Nuclear Plant, Japan's first nuclear power station

The Tokaimura nuclear accidents were two nuclear incidents which occurred near the village of Tōkai, Ibaraki Prefecture, Japan. The first accident occurred on 11 March 1997, producing an explosion after an experimental batch of solidified nuclear waste caught fire at the Power Reactor and Nuclear Fuel Development Corporation (PNC) radioactive waste bituminisation facility. Over twenty people were exposed to radiation.

The second was a criticality accident at a separate fuel reprocessing facility belonging to Japan Nuclear Fuel Conversion Co. (JCO) on 30 September 1999 due to improper handling of liquid uranium fuel for an experimental reactor. The incident spanned approximately 20 hours and resulted in the deaths of two workers; of 436 people whose doses of radiation exposure were evaluated, none exceeded annual regulatory dosage limits.

It was determined that the accidents were due to inadequate regulatory oversight, lack of appropriate safety culture and inadequate worker training and qualification. After these two accidents, a series of lawsuits were filed and new safety measures were put into effect.

By March 2000, Japan's atomic and nuclear commissions began regular investigations of facilities, expansive education regarding proper procedures and safety culture regarding handling nuclear chemicals and waste. JCO's credentials were removed, the first Japanese plant operator to be punished by law for mishandling nuclear radiation. This was followed by the company president's resignation and six officials being charged with professional negligence.

== Background ==
Nuclear power was an important energy alternative for natural-resource-poor Japan to limit dependence on imported energy, providing about 30% of Japan's electricity up until the Fukushima nuclear disaster of 2011, after which nuclear electricity production fell into sharp decline.

Tōkai's location (about 70 miles from Tokyo) and available land space made it ideal for nuclear power production, so a series of experimental nuclear reactors and then the Tōkai Nuclear Power Plant – the country's first commercial nuclear power station – were built there. Over time, dozens of companies and government institutes were established nearby to provide nuclear research, experimentation, manufacturing, fuel fabrication, enrichment and disposal facilities. Nearly one-third of Tōkai's population relied upon nuclear industry-related employment.

== 1997 nuclear waste accident ==
On 11 March 1997, Tōkai's first serious nuclear incident occurred at PNC's bituminization facility. It is sometimes called the Dōnen accident (動燃事故, Dōnen jiko), 'Dōnen' being an abbreviation of PNC's full Japanese name Dōryokuro Kakunenryō Kaihatsu Jigyōdan. The site encased and solidified low-level liquid waste in molten asphalt (bitumen), and placed the mixture in metal drums for storage. That day, the site was trialing a new asphalt-waste mix ratio, using 20% less asphalt than normal. A gradual chemical reaction inside one fresh barrel ignited the already-hot contents at 10:00 a.m. and quickly spread to several others nearby. Temperature controls in the building, designed to prevent the asphalt from reaching its ignition point, were malfunctioning at the time. Workers failed to properly extinguish the fire, and smoke and radiation alarms forced all personnel to evacuate the building. At 8 p.m., just as people were preparing to reenter the building, built up flammable gases ignited and exploded, breaking windows and doors, which allowed smoke and radiation to escape into the surrounding area.

The incident exposed 37 nearby personnel to trace amounts of radiation in what the government's Science and Technology Agency declared the country's worst-yet nuclear accident, which was rated a 3 on the International Nuclear Event Scale. A week after the event, meteorological officials detected unusually high levels of caesium 40 km (25 miles) southwest of the plant. Aerial views over the nuclear processing plant building showed a damaged roof from the fire and explosion allowing continued external radiation exposure.

PNC management mandated two workers to falsely report the chronology of events that led to the facility's evacuation, in order to cover up the lack of proper supervision. Dōnen leadership failed to immediately report the fire to the Science and Technology Agency (STA). This delay was due to their own internal investigation of the fire, which hampered the deployment of emergency response teams and prolonged the radiation exposure. Dōnen facility officials initially reported a 20% increase of radiation levels in the area surrounding the reprocessing plant, but later revealed the true percent was ten times higher than initially published. Tōkai residents demanded criminal prosecution of PNC officials, reorganization of company leadership and closure of the plant itself. Following public outcry, the facility closed until reopening in November 2000, when it was reinstated as a nuclear fuel reprocessing plant.

Later, Prime Minister Ryutaro Hashimoto criticized the delay that allowed radiation to continue to impact local areas.

== 1999 accident ==
1999 Tōkai nuclear accident
- Tōkai-mura (Japan) Location of Tōkai-mura in Japan
- Date: September 30, 1999 (27 years ago)
- Location: Tōkai, Ibaraki, Japan; 36°28′47″N 140°33′13″E
- Type: Nuclear criticality accident
- Cause: Uncontrolled nuclear fission after uranyl nitrate overload
- Outcome: INES Level 4 (accident with local consequences)
- Deaths: 2
- Injuries: 667 irradiated
- Inquiries: World Nuclear Association

On 30 September 1999, another, more serious event known as the Tōkai nuclear accident (Japanese: 東海村JCO臨界事故, romanized: Tōkai-mura JCO-rinkai-jiko) occurred about four miles away from the PNC facility, at a fuel enrichment plant operated by JCO, a subsidiary of Sumitomo Metal Mining Company. It was the worst civilian nuclear radiation accident in Japan prior to the Fukushima Daiichi nuclear disaster in 2011. The incident exposed the surrounding population to hazardous radiation after a uranium mixture reached criticality, triggering uncontrolled nuclear chain reactions over the next several hours. The three technicians mixing fuel were exposed to a large amount of radiation, and two of those three died from complications of radiation poisoning in the months following. Official investigations concluded that the released radiation caused no harm to the surrounding public or environment, but the event nevertheless impacted the local economy and affected public perceptions.

=== Background ===
==== Regulatory deficiencies ====
There was no criticality accident alarm because the licensing board incorrectly concluded that a criticality accident could not happen at the site. The site was also not included in the National Plan for the Prevention of Nuclear Disasters; the lack of a disaster plan led to delays in informing the nearby public of the accident.

The regulator also did not conduct routine inspections to determine whether production processes were being carried out correctly.

==== Company errors ====
Because of a combination of reduced revenue, layoffs and inexperience, JCO felt pressured to manufacture fuel at a different enrichment which was made infrequently, using a procedure that had not been approved by regulatory bodies. The unapproved process in which they made the fuel skipped several crucial safety steps. JCO stated that they did not submit this procedure to the regulator because they knew it would not get approved, in which case they would not have been able to make it at all.

1062762769

The JCO facility converted enriched (U_{3}O_{8}) into enriched Uranium dioxide fuel. This served as the first step in producing fuel rods for power plants and research reactors. Handling concentrated fissile material requires precision and has the potential to impose extreme risks to technicians. If done improperly, the process of combining nuclear products can produce a fission reaction which, in turn, produces radiation. In order to enrich the fuel, a specific chemical purification procedure is followed. The steps included feeding small batches of uranium oxide powder into a designated dissolving tank to produce uranyl nitrate using nitric acid. Next, the mixture is carefully transported to a buffer tank, specially designed to prevent fission activity from reaching criticality. In a precipitation tank, ammonia is then added, forming a solid product and capturing any remaining nuclear waste contaminants. Lastly, uranium oxide is placed in the dissolving tanks until purified, without enriching the isotopes, in a wet-process technology specialized by Japan.

The fuel being made on the day of the event was JCO's first batch for the Jōyō experimental fast breeder reactor in three years; no proper qualification and training requirements were established to prepare for the process.Pressure placed upon JCO to increase efficiency led the company to skip several key steps in the enrichment procedure. Under correct operating procedure, aqueous uranyl nitrate would be stored inside a buffer tank and gradually pumped into the precipitation tank in 2.4 kg (5.3 lb) increments. Instead of pumping the uranyl nitrate, the technicians used buckets to pour the product by hand directly into the precipitation tank; the workers followed JCO operating manual guidance in doing this, but were unaware it was not approved by the STA.

=== Chronology of events ===
JCO facility technicians Hisashi Ouchi, Masato Shinohara, and Yutaka Yokokawa were speeding up the last few steps of the fuel/conversion process to meet shipping requirements. To save processing time, and for convenience, the team mixed the chemicals in stainless-steel buckets. At around 10:35, the precipitation tank reached critical mass with its fill level at about 16 kg (35 lb) of uranium. The hazardous level was reached after the technicians added a seventh bucket containing uranyl nitrate, enriched to 18.8% ^{235}U, to the tank. The solution added to the tank was almost seven times the legal mass limit specified by the STA.

The nuclear fuel conversion standards specified in the 1996 JCO Operating Manual dictated the proper procedures regarding dissolution of uranium oxide powder in a designated dissolution tank. The buffer tank's tall, narrow geometry was designed to hold the solution safely and to prevent criticality. The workers bypassed the buffer tanks entirely, opting to pour the uranyl nitrate directly into the precipitation tank. Unlike the buffer tank, the precipitation tank had not been designed to hold unlimited quantities of this type of solution; its wide cylindrical shape made it favorable to criticality. Uncontrolled nuclear fission (a self-sustaining chain reaction) began immediately, emitting intense gamma and neutron radiation.

At the time of the event, Ouchi had his body draped over the tank while Shinohara stood on a platform to assist in pouring the solution. Yokokawa was sitting at a desk four metres away. All three technicians observed a blue flash (possibly Cherenkov radiation) and gamma radiation alarms sounded. Over the next several hours, the fission reaction produced continuous chain reactions.

Ouchi and Shinohara immediately experienced pain, nausea, and difficulty breathing. Both workers went to the decontamination room, where Ouchi vomited. Ouchi received the largest radiation exposure, resulting in rapid difficulties with mobility, coherence, and loss of consciousness. Upon the point of critical mass, large amounts of high-level gamma radiation set off alarms in the building, prompting the three technicians to evacuate. All three of the workers were unaware of the impact of the accident or reporting criteria.

A worker in the next building became aware of the injured employees, one of which was experiencing symptoms of radiation exposure and had passed out and regained consciousness 70 minutes later, and contacted emergency medical assistance; an ambulance escorted them to the nearest hospital. The fission products contaminated the fuel reprocessing building and immediate surroundings of the nuclear facility. Emergency service workers arrived and escorted other plant workers outside of the facility's muster zones.

56 other people at the JCO plant were reported to have been exposed to the radiation. Construction workers at a job site nearby were also reported as exposed.

The next morning, workers ended the chain reaction by draining water from the surrounding cooling jacket installed on the precipitation tank. The water served as a neutron reflector. A boric acid solution was added to the precipitation tank to reduce all contents to sub-critical levels; boron was selected for its neutron absorption properties.

Timeline of 1999 accident
Day	Time	Event/action	Affected parties
30 September 1999	10:35	Criticality event occurred, setting off radiation monitors and alarms; evacuation begins and employees exposed to radiation	3 workers: Hisashi Ouchi, Masato Shinohara and Yutaka Yokokawa
30 September	Until 23:30	(5 hours later) STA confirms continuing chain reactions; Tokaimura sets up headquarters for the incidents, (12 hours later) broadcasts all surrounding residents to evacuate, informs Japan's leadership and ceased all crop and water usage	Tokaimura City and National Leadership
1 October 1999	All day	Road blocks implemented; shelter in place lifted but schools closed all day; water drainage initiated to stop chain reaction.	All residents
2 October 1999	All day	Health checks conducted on all residents, measuring radiation; schools reopened and government press conferences held	All residents

==== Evacuation ====
By mid-afternoon, the plant workers and surrounding residents were asked to evacuate. Five hours after the start of criticality, evacuation began of some 161 people from 39 households in Tōkaimura within a 350-metre radius from the conversion building. Twelve hours after the incident, 300,000 residents surrounding the nuclear facility were told to stay indoors and cease all agricultural production. This restriction was lifted the next afternoon. Almost 15 days later, the facility instituted protection methods with sandbags and other shielding to protect from residual gamma radiation.

=== Immediate response ===
Without an emergency plan or public communication from the JCO, confusion and panic followed the event. Authorities warned locals not to harvest crops or drink well water. To ease public concerns, officials began radiation testing of residents living about 10 kilometres (6 mi) from the facility. Over the next 10 days, about 10,000 medical check-ups were conducted. Dozens of emergency workers and residents who lived nearby were hospitalized, while hundreds of thousands of others were forced to remain indoors for 24 hours. Testing confirmed 39 of the workers were exposed to the radiation. At least 667 workers, first-responders, and nearby residents were exposed to excess radiation as a result of the accident. Radioactive gas levels stayed high in the area even after the plant was sealed. Finally, on 12 October, it was discovered that a roof ventilation fan had been left on and it was shut down. Sometime after the incident, people in the area were asked to lend any gold they had to help estimate the neutron flux the public was exposed to.

=== Aftermath ===
Ultimately the incident was classified as an "irradiation" rather than a "contamination" accident under Level 4 on the Nuclear Event Scale. This determination labeled the situation low risk outside of the facility. The technicians and workers in the facility were measured for radiation contamination. The three technicians measured significantly higher levels of radiation than the measurement designated the maximum allowable dose (50 mSv) for Japanese nuclear workers. Many employees of the company and local population suffered accidental radiation exposure exceeding safe levels. Over fifty plant workers tested up to 23 mSv and local residents up to 15 mSv.

==== Environmental impact ====
STA and Ibaraki Prefecture began monitoring the levels of gamma immediately after they were notified of the accident. They collected samples of tap water, well water and precipitation within 10 kilometres of the site. They also took samples of vegetation, sea water, dairy products and sea products for testing. They found low levels of radioactivity in some of the vegetation, but they did not find any in the dairy products, water or sea.

==== Impact on technicians ====
According to the radiation testing by the STA, Ouchi was exposed to 17 Sv of radiation, Shinohara 10 Sv, and Yokokawa received 3 Sv. The two technicians who received the higher doses, Ouchi and Shinohara, died several months later.

Hisashi Ouchi (Japanese pronunciation: [çisaɕi oːt͡ɕi]) (大内久, Ōuchi Hisashi), 35, was treated at the University of Tokyo Hospital for 83 days. Ouchi suffered serious radiation burns to most of his body, had severe damage to his internal organs, and had a near-zero white blood cell count. Without a functioning immune system, Ouchi was vulnerable to hospital-acquired infection and was placed in a special radiation ward to limit the risk of infection. A micrograph of his chromosomes showed that none of them were identifiable. Doctors tried to restore some functionality to Ouchi's immune system by administering peripheral blood stem cell transplantation, which at the time was a new form of treatment.

After receiving the transplant from his sister, Ouchi's white blood cell counts temporarily increased, but he soon began to succumb to his other injuries. Many other interventions were conducted in an attempt to arrest further decline of his badly damaged body, including repeated use of cultured skin grafts and pharmacological interventions with painkillers, broad-spectrum antibiotics and granulocyte colony-stimulating factor, without any measurable success. Although small areas of Ouchi's skin and mucous membranes recovered with treatment, his overall condition continued to deteriorate, and medical personnel privately doubted whether treatment should be continued given the lack of effectiveness and the pain Ouchi was experiencing.

Two months after the accident, Ouchi suffered cardiac arrest; although he was revived, he became unresponsive. At the wishes of his family, doctors continued to treat him, even though it was clear he could not survive. On 19 December, the family agreed to a do-not-resuscitate order. His wife had hoped that Ouchi would at least survive until 1 January, since it was the arrival of the 2000s. But his condition deteriorated into multiple organ failure, and he died on 21 December 1999.

Masato Shinohara (篠原 理人, Shinohara Masato), 40, was transported to the same facility. He underwent radical cancer treatments, numerous successful skin grafts, and a transfusion from congealed umbilical cord blood (to boost stem cell count). In February 2000, Shinohara was placed on a ventilator. He succumbed to lung and kidney failure on 27 April 2000.

Their supervisor, Yutaka Yokokawa, 54, received treatment from the National Institute of Radiological Sciences (NIRS) in Chiba, Japan. He was released three months later with minor radiation sickness. He faced negligence charges in October 2000.

==== Investigations and causes ====
According to the International Atomic Energy Agency, the cause of the accidents were "human error and serious breaches of safety principles". Several human errors caused the incident, including careless material handling procedures, inexperienced technicians, inadequate supervision and obsolete safety procedures on the operating floor. The company had not had any incidents for over 15 years, making company employees complacent in their daily responsibilities.

The 1999 incident resulted from poor management of operation manuals, failure to train and/or educate technicians and engineers, and improper procedures associated with handling nuclear chemicals. Other factors included a lack of regulatory supervision and an inadequate safety culture. The lack of communication between the engineers and workers contributed to lack of reporting when the incident arose. Comments within the 2012 Report by the National Diet of Japan Fukushima Nuclear Accident Independent Investigation Commission notice regulatory and nuclear industry overconfidence, and governance failures may equally apply to the Tokaimura nuclear accident.

==== Victim compensation and plant closure ====
Over 600 plant workers, firefighters, emergency personnel and local residents were exposed to radioactivity following the incident. In October 1999, JCO set up advisory booths to process compensation claims and inquiries of those affected. By July 2000, over 7,000 compensation claims were filed and settled. In September 2000, JCO agreed to pay $121 million in compensation to settle 6,875 claims from people exposed to radiation and affected agricultural and service businesses. All residents within 350 metres of the incident and those forced to evacuate received compensation if they agreed to not sue the company in the future.

In late March 2000, the STA cancelled JCO's credentials for operation serving as the first Japanese plant operator to be punished by law for mishandling nuclear radiation. This suit was followed by the company president's resignation. In October, six officials from JCO were charged with professional negligence derived from failure to properly train technicians and knowingly subverting safety procedures.

==== Legal suits ====
In April 2001, six employees, including the chief of production department at the time, pleaded guilty to a charge of negligence resulting in death. Among those arrested was Yokokawa for his failure to supervise proper procedures. The JCO President also pleaded guilty on behalf of the company. During the trial, the jury learned that a 1995 JCO safety committee had approved the use of steel buckets in the procedure. Furthermore, a widely distributed but unauthorized 1996 manual recommended the use of buckets in making the solution. A STA report indicated JCO management had permitted these hazardous practices beginning in 1993 to shortcut the conversion process, even though it was contrary to approved nuclear chemical handling procedures.

==== Legislation ====
As a response to the incidents, special laws were put in place stipulating operational safety procedures and quarterly inspection requirements. These inspections focused on the proper conduct of workers and leadership. This change mandated both safety education and quality assurance of all facilities and activities associated with nuclear power generation. Starting in 2000, Japan's atomic and nuclear commissions began regular investigations of facilities, expansive education regarding proper procedures and safety culture regarding handling nuclear chemicals and waste.

Efforts to comply with emergency preparedness procedures and international guideline requirements continued. New systems were put in place for handling a similar incident with governing legislature and institutions in an effort to prevent further situations from occurring.

Japan imports 80% of its energy, so mounting pressures to produce self-sustaining energy sources remain. In 2014, Japan's government decided to establish the "Strategic Energy Plan" naming nuclear as an important power source that can safely stabilize and produce the energy supply and demand of the country. This event contributed to antinuclear activist movements against nuclear power in Japan. To this day, the tensions between the need for produced power outside of nonexistent natural resources and the safety of the country's population remain. Advocacy for acute nuclear disease victims and eradication of nuclear related incidents has led to several movements across the globe promoting human welfare and environmental conservation.

== In popular culture ==
The 1999 accident is mentioned, along with a flashback scene of a hospital visit to Hisashi Ouchi, in the 2023 Japanese miniseries The Days, a dramatization of the Fukushima nuclear accident.

== See also ==
- Nuclear power in Japan
- Fukushima Daiichi nuclear disaster
- Rokkasho Reprocessing Plant, meant to be the successor to the Tokai Reprocessing Plant
- Cecil Kelley criticality accident, a previous fatal accident in 1958 that also involved a solution of fissile material in a tank
