= Sanshiro Kume =

Japanese radiochemist (1926–2009)

Sanshiro Kume (久米 三四郎, Kume Sanshirō; March 22, 1926 – August 31, 2009) was a radiochemist who lectured at Osaka University. He has been described as an "outspoken anti-nuclear power plant scientist".

Kume served as an adviser to residents who filed a lawsuit to try to stop the Monju Experimental Breeder Reactor from being built. He also led a panel of experts who examined official reports on the 1995 sodium coolant leak at the Monju reactor. Kume also assisted residents who "lodged Japan’s first lawsuit seeking annulment of a permit to build a nuclear power reactor in Ikata, Ehime Prefecture in 1973".
