= Vandellòs I nuclear incident =

1989 nuclear accident in Catalonia, Spain

Vandellòs I nuclear Incident
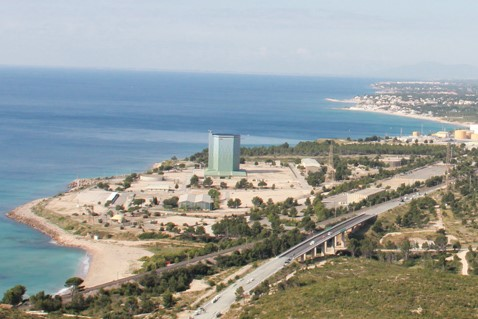
- Remaining facilities of the Vandellòs I Nuclear Power Plant in 2013. The blue structure, designed to blend into the background, contains the decaying nuclear reactor.
- Date: 19 October 1989
- Location: 40°57′18″N 0°52′34″E
- Type: INES Level 3: Serious incident. Collapse of the cooling system
- Cause: Fire in the electric generator
- Outcome: Nuclear decommissioning of Vandellòs I Power Plant and new safety protocols introduced (plans for the evacuation of civilians, emergency drills...)
- Charges: 5 high ranks of Hispano Francesa de Energía Nuclear SA (Hifrensa) accused of risk of omission
- Trial: 1999
- Verdict: All charges absolved alleging it was a design error

The Vandellòs I nuclear Incident was a fire that caused an interruption of the cooling system in the Vandellòs Nuclear Power Plant, Catalonia (Spain) on 19 October 1989.

At the end of Francoist Spain, France sold Spain a UNGG reactor. This already obsolete energy technology was installed because as a by-product it provided plutonium that could be used to manufacture atomic bombs. Vandellòs I Nuclear Power Plant was inaugurated in 1972 when there were only two operational nuclear power plants in Spain: Garoña and Zorita. Seventeen years after opening, the rudimentary technology produced a mechanical failure in the steam turbine which caused a fire. The cabling of the plant was not fireproof, and the control computer and the cooling system would also receive damage.

A core meltdown was avoided due to the intervention of the Corps of Firefighters of Catalonia and the plant technicians, who were able to extinguish the fire and turn off the nuclear reactor manually. It continues to be one of the most significant nuclear incidents in Western Europe, classified as a serious incident according to the International Nuclear Event Scale. Consequently, the plant would be decommissioned, due to the damage in the systems, and new safety protocols were introduced because the old ones proved to be insufficient.

== See also ==
- Goiânia accident
- Three Mile Island accident
- Windscale fire
