= Power Reactor and Nuclear Fuel Development Corporation =

The Power Reactor and Nuclear Fuel Development Corporation (PNC) (動力炉・核燃料開発事業団, Dōryokuro Kakunenryō Kaihatsu Jigyōdan) or 動燃 (Dōnen) for short, was a Japanese nuclear energy research organization established 2 October 1967 with the Atomic Fuel Corporation as its parent organization and disbanded in 1998 to be restructured as the Japan Nuclear Cycle Development Institute. The organization specialized in special breeder reactors and the Advanced Thermal Reactor. It also owned a nuclear reprocessing facility and its activities included uranium exploration in Australia and disposal of high-level waste.

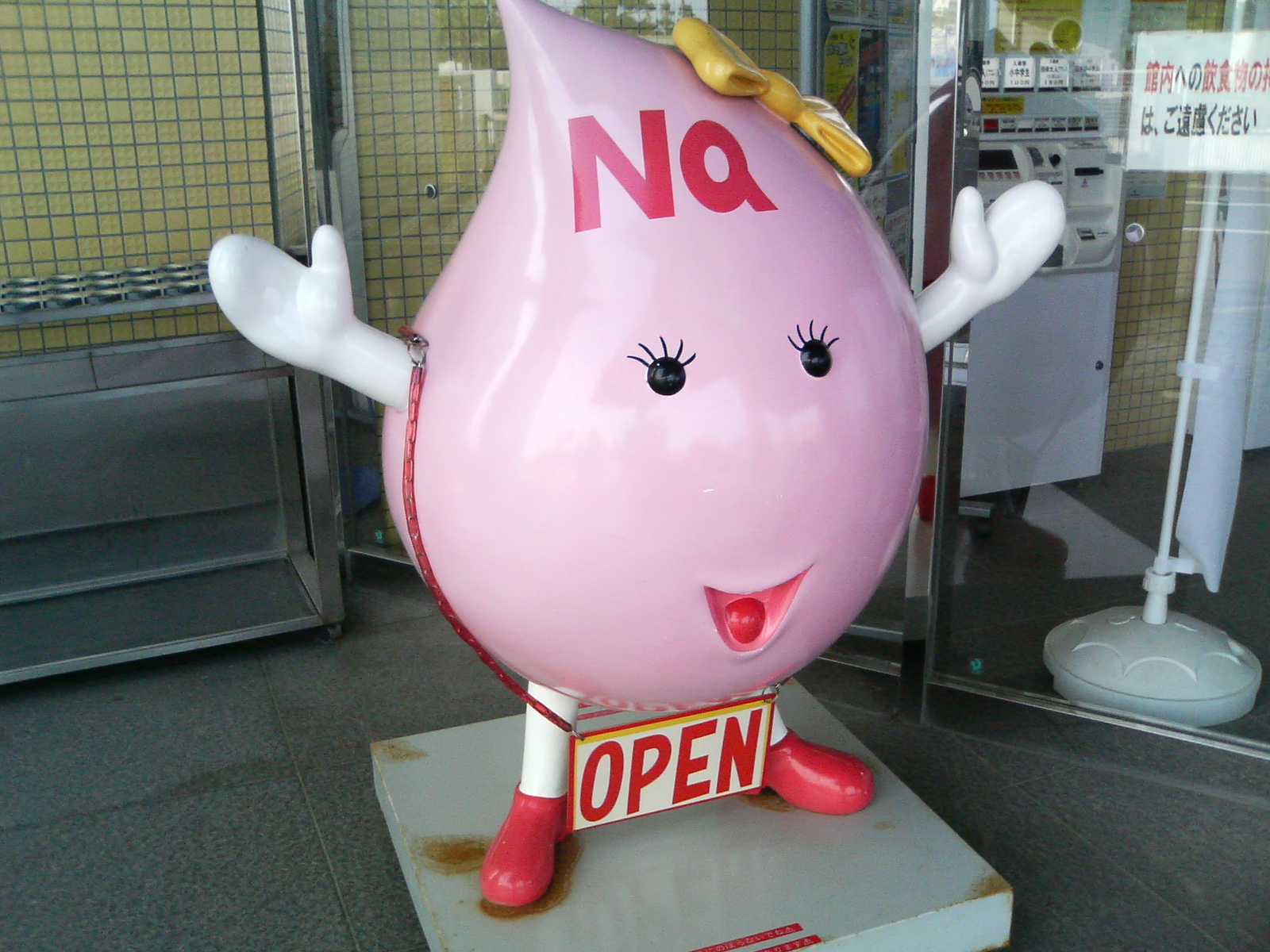
A promotional character, representing sodium coolant.

== Outline ==
In the fast-growing 1960s Japanese business world, domestic reactor technology was mostly undeveloped, so importing reactor designs and nuclear fuel proved to be the best economic option. Uranium enrichment technology at the time also had military secrets associated with it, making importing a necessity.

Since Japan had very few hydraulic energy resources, breeder reactors and renewable energy were attractive technologies. However, the organization existing at the time to do such research, the Japan Atomic Energy Research Institute had been falling into an unstable situation, and tests on nuclear power plants were limited and regulated by the companies that owned the plants. Thus PNC was created and did development work for the Monju reactor and other cutting-edge projects. The breeder reactor technology was difficult to master due to the difficulty in the handling of sodium, and for a time, PNC was even called the pros of sodium.

Various accidents associated with the Tokaimura site, Monju plant, and another asphalt processing plant ultimately caused reorganization yet again into the Japan Nuclear Cycle Development Institute.

== Puruto-kun video ==
Another event from PNC's history is an image character called プルト君 (Puruto-kun), which is similar to saying "Plutonium boy". Promotional videos that PNC released showed Puruto-kun debunking various fears about plutonium, such as:

- If bad guys dropped Plutonium into the ocean, it actually won't dissolve into the water well and will fall to the bottom.
- If you drink Plutonium mixed with water, you'll still be mostly fine since it will exit your body quickly.

The image character received harsh criticisms from international press. The question of how harmful plutonium is to a human depends on the chemical form of the plutonium and the mode of exposure. Powdered plutonium dioxide (the form in MOX) is very resistant to digestion in acid; if swallowed, it is likely to pass through the digestive system and leave in the stool. However, when inhaled, finely powdered plutonium dioxide will stay in the lungs for a long time, thus exposing the person to a far higher radiation dose for a given amount of plutonium radioactivity. Water-soluble forms of plutonium can be absorbed in the digestive system, work done in the 1970s suggests that the yearly oral limit for water-soluble forms of plutonium-239 should be 830 kBq while the limit for water-insoluble forms of plutonium-239 should be 5000 kBq (5 MBq). The same study suggested that the yearly limit for water-insoluble forms of plutonium in air should be 750 Bq, which is far lower than either of the oral limits.

The question of the degree of harm which is caused by "bad guys" dropping plutonium into the sea is not a simple question; the radioactive power pack containing plutonium-238 which was intended for use in space for the Apollo 13 Moon mission was wrapped in a heat-resistant package which is likely to prevent leaking of plutonium for a very long time. However, plutonium released in the form of nitrate or fine powder is likely to absorb onto mineral particles such as silt. Depending on the exact conditions this absorption onto silt could either tend to fix the plutonium in soil or the silt at the bottom of a lake (or sea), or it could enable the plutonium to migrate from one location to another with greater ease.

== See also ==
- Tokaimura nuclear accident
- Rokkasho Reprocessing Plant
