= Tsuruga Nuclear Power Plant =

Nuclear power plant in Tsuruga, Fukui Prefecture, Japan

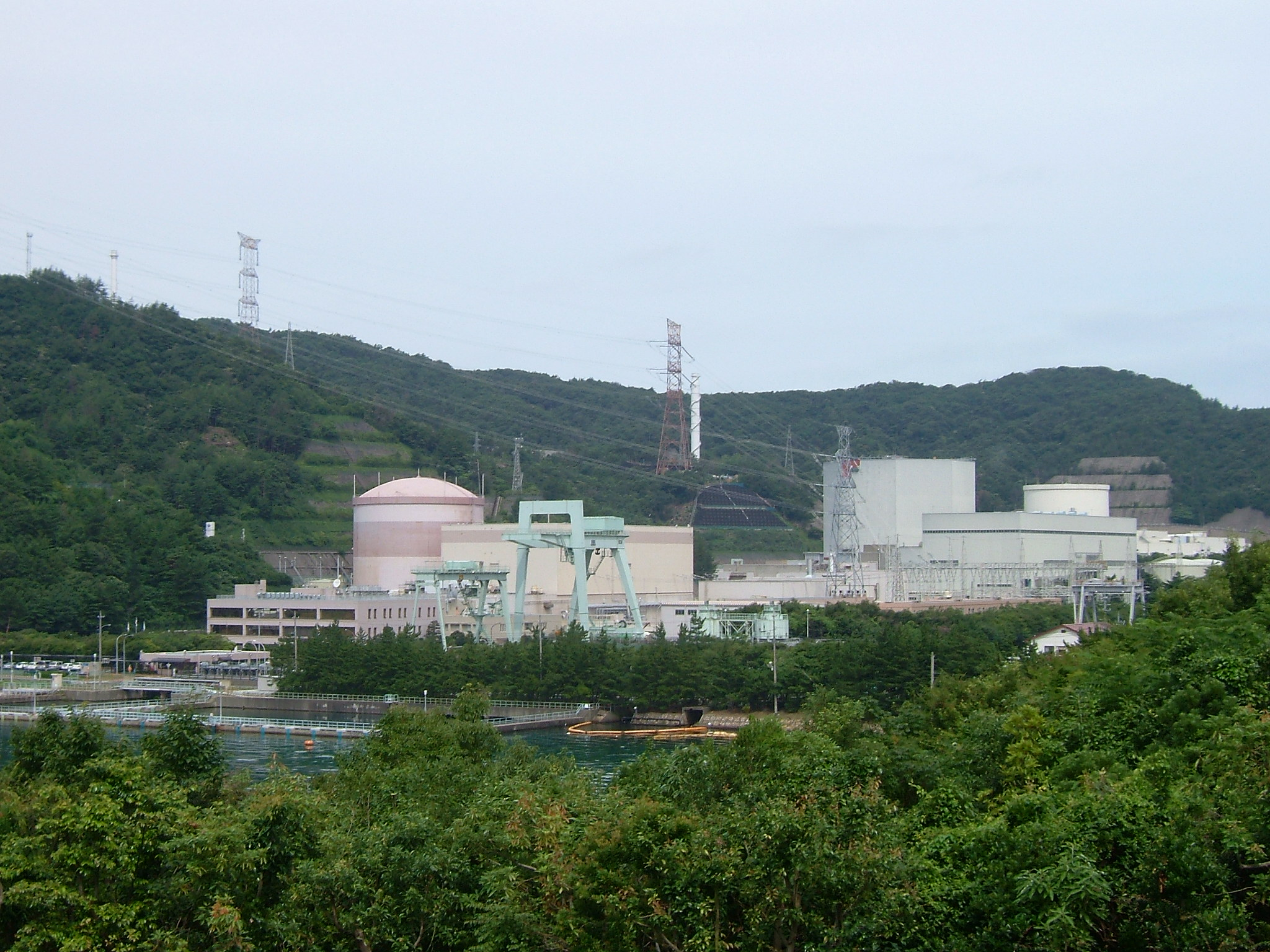
- Tsuruga NPP
- Country: Japan
- Coordinates: 35°45′7″N 136°1′8″E
- Status: Out of service
- Construction began: 24 November 1966
- Commission date: 14 March 1970
- Operator: Japan Atomic Power Company

Nuclear power station
- Reactor type: PWR
- Cooling source: Tsuruga bay, Sea of Japan

Power generation
- Units operational: 1 x 1,160 MW
- Units planned: 2 × 1,538 MW
- Units decommissioned: 1 x 357 MW
- Nameplate capacity: 1,160 MW
- Capacity factor: 0
- Annual net output: 0 GW·h

External links
- Commons: Related media on Commons

The Tsuruga Nuclear Power Plant (敦賀発電所, Tsuruga hatsudensho; Tsuruga NPP) is located in the city of Tsuruga, Fukui Prefecture, Japan. It is operated by the Japan Atomic Power Company (JAPC). The total site area is 5.12 square kilometres (1.98 sq mi) with 94% of it being green area that the company is working to preserve. The Tsuruga site is a dual site with the decommissioned prototype Fugen Nuclear Power Plant.

Construction of two new nuclear reactors is currently planned. However, there have been several delays due to the need for seismic upgrades, even before the March 2011 earthquake. As of 2014, construction has not begun on the two new reactors, although a tunnel has been completed linking the tip of the peninsula with the existing Units 1 and 2 sites.

== Nuclear reactors on site ==
| Unit | Type | Commission date | Output |
|---|---|---|---|
| Tsuruga – 1 (decommissioning) | BWR | 14 March 1970 | 357 MWe |
| Tsuruga – 2 | PWR | 17 February 1987 | 1160 MWe |
| Tsuruga – 3 (planned) | APWR | – | 1538 MWe |
| Tsuruga – 4 (planned) | APWR | – | 1538 MWe |

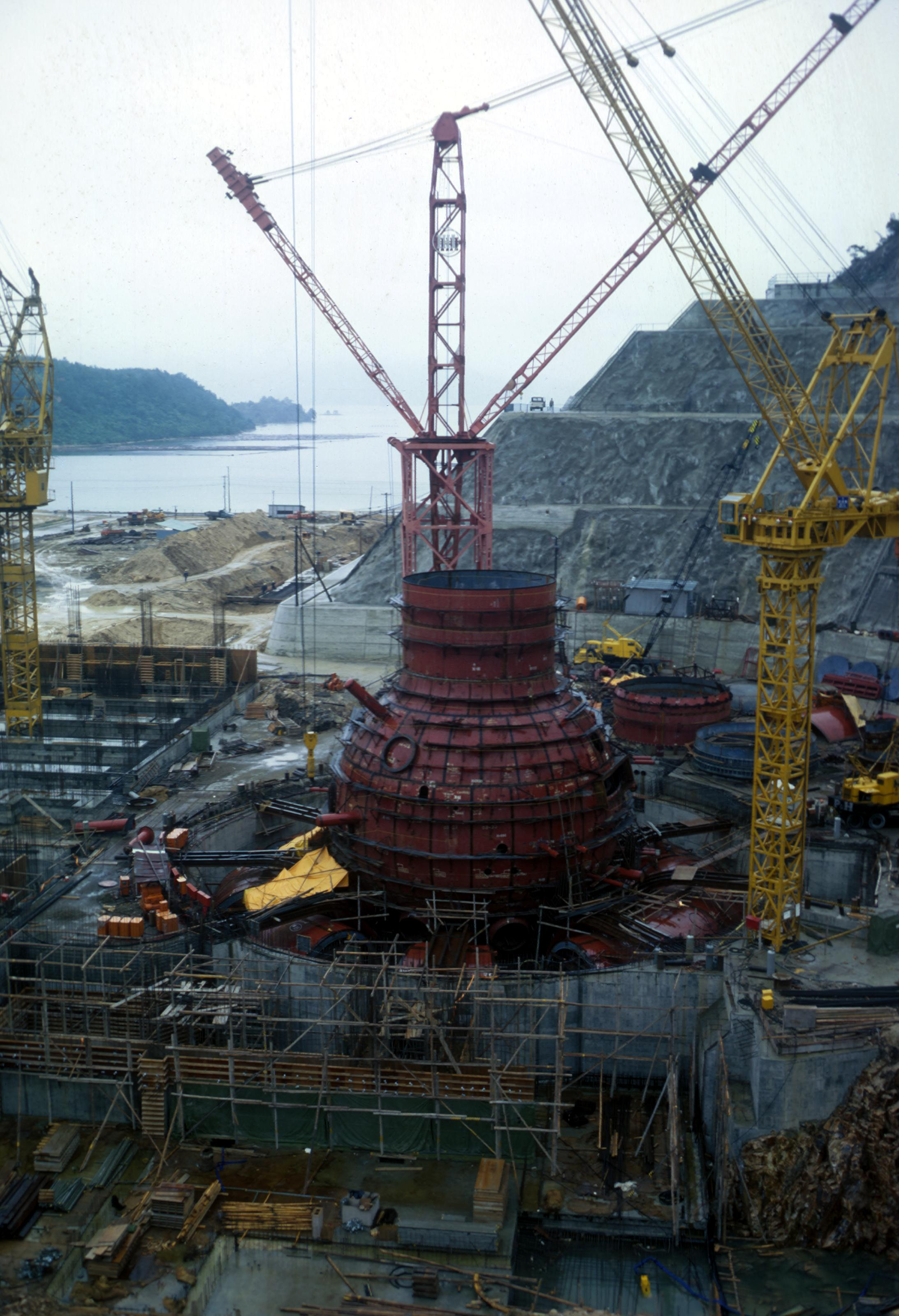
Tsuruga 1 under construction circa 1967

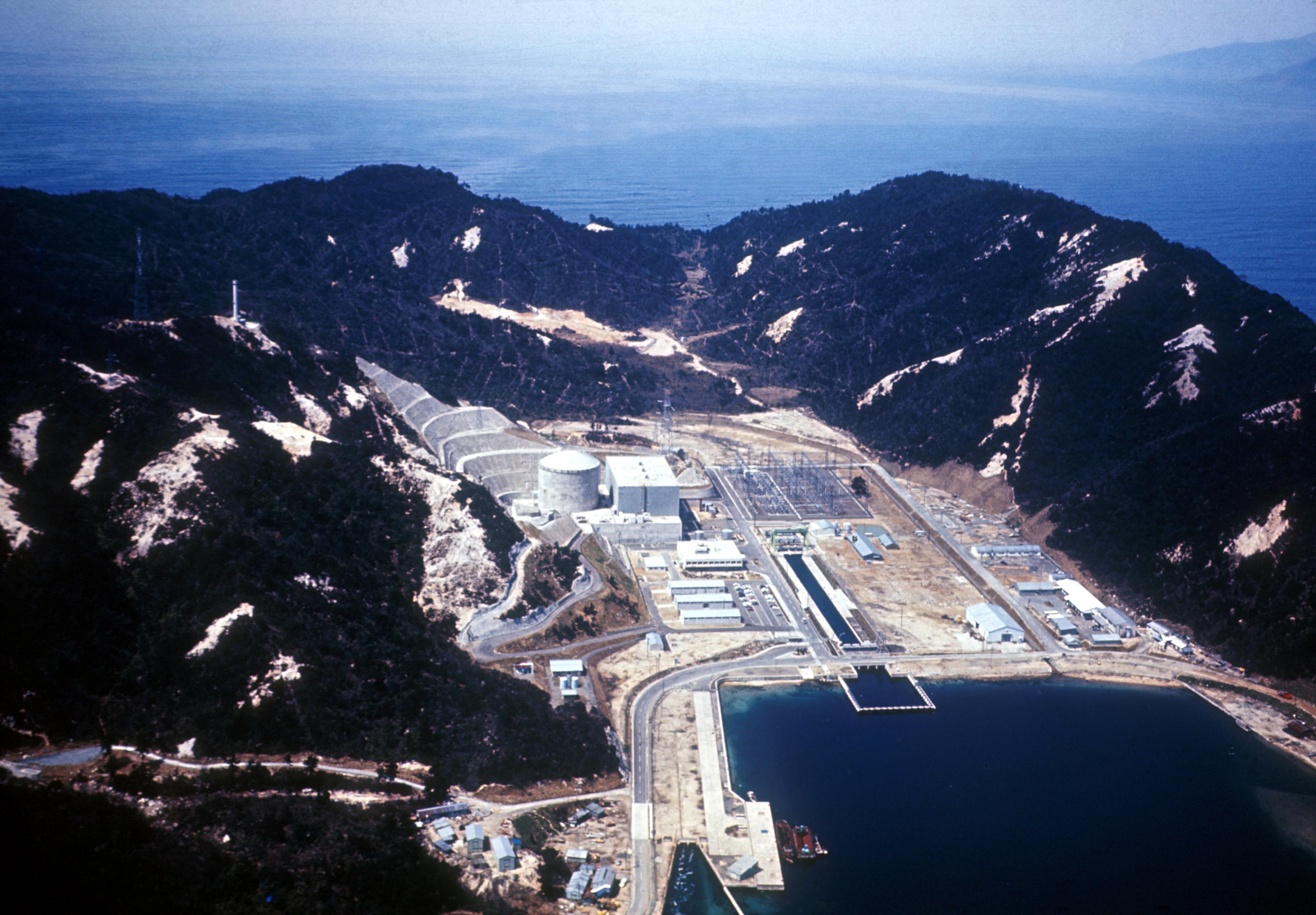
Tsuruga 1 circa 1970

The Tsuruga 1 reactor is the oldest commercial reactor in Japan. It was shut down for a safety inspection on 26 January 2011. In March 2015 JAPC announced that Tsuruga 1 would be decommissioned. In March 2015 the Nuclear Regulation Authority (NRA) accepted an expert report that concluded the plant is on an active fault, which put any restart of Tsuruga 2 in doubt.

== Events ==
- In March 1981, drainage from unit 1 caused a release of radioactivity. The forty-day cover-up of a spill of 16 tons of radioactive primary cooling water was revealed only in April.
- On 2 May 2011, Kyodo officials announced higher levels of radioactivity in the cooling water, JAPC admitted technical problems and announced to check for radioactivity on a daily basis from now on, instead of checking only every week, what has been standard procedure up to now.
- On 12 November 2011 at 7:45 PM local time a fire broke out in the No. 1 reactor. After a switch for a spare electrical device at the water processing facility was operated by a worker, the fire was ignited because a short circuit caused a series of hot sparks. After the fire was put out, no casualties were reported. JAPC said that there was no leakage of radiation, because the reactor was closed for inspection.

== Juridical actions of citizens against restarting the nuclear reactors ==
On 8 November 2011 a group of 40 citizens of Otsu in Shiga prefecture started a lawsuit at the Otsu District Court against Japan Atomic Power Company. They asked for a provisional court order to delay the restart of the two reactors at the Tsuruga Nuclear Power Plant in the city of Tsuruga. The plaintiffs argued that the plant is unsafe being built on a fault, and a severe accident could occur during an earthquake endangering the health of all residents, also contaminating Lake Biwa. They also criticize the government's safety and technological standards and regulations.

== Seismic research done in 2005, 2011 and 2012 ==
On 5 March 2012, a group of seismic researchers revealed the possibility of a 7.4M (or even more potent) earthquake under the Tsuruga Nuclear Powerplant. Before this date, the Japanese governmental Earthquake Research Committee and Japan Atomic Power had calculated that the Urasoko fault under the plant, combined with other faults connected to it, was around 25 km long. and could cause a 7.2M quake and a 1.7 meter displacement. On top of this, the presence of the oceanic faults were not taken into account by NISA and JAP in the assessment of the safety of the Tsuruga nuclear power plant.

Analysis of sonic survey and other data provided by Japan Atomic Power analysed by a panel of experts of Nuclear and Industrial Safety Agency showed the presence of multiple faults existing within 2 to 3 km from the Urasoko fault. According to Yuichi Sugiyama, a member of this group of scientists, these faults were highly likely to be activated together, and this would extend the length of the Urasoko fault to 35 km.

Computer-simulations calculating the length of a fault based on its displacement, showed the Urasoko fault to be 39 km long, a result close to the length estimated by the sonic survey data, and the fault could cause some 5 meter displacement when activated together with other faults.

Sugiyama, the leader of this research group of the National Institute of Advanced Industrial Science and Technology, warned that – as other faults on the south side of the Urasoko fault could become activated together – "The worst-case scenario should be taken into consideration".

According to the experts, there were many other faults located under one reactor on the west side of the Urasoku fault that could also move simultaneously. If this would be confirmed, the location of the Tsuruga nuclear plant would be disqualified.

On 6 March 2012, NISA asked Japan Atomic Power Co. to reassess the worst-case scenario for earthquakes at the Tsuruga-nuclear power plant: what damage this could do to the buildings on the site, because the Urazoko fault, running around 250 meters from the reactor buildings, could have a serious impact on the earthquake resistance of the power plant. NISA was also planning to send similar instructions to two other nuclear power plant operators in the Fukui area: Kansai Electric Power Company, and Japan Atomic Energy Agency, because the Mihama Nuclear Power Plant and the Monju fast-breeder reactor could also be affected by a possible earthquake caused by the Urazoko fault.

A few weeks later, on 21 March 2012, was revealed that the results of sonic research done in 2005 were ignored by JAPCO and that this data was kept secret in 2008 from a NISA research team of experts.

After an on-site survey at four points of geological layers by a panel of geologists, on 24 April 2012, NISA did admit that the 35-km-long Urazoko fault that runs under the Tsuruga reactors could be active. The experts determined that an earthquake did happen there some 4,500 years ago and that the other fault (without a name) running right beneath reactor 2 could slip and cause critical damage to the reactor induced by an earthquake caused by the Urazoko fault. By definition, a fault is "active" when it is believed to have caused a quake about 120,000 to 130,000 years ago or later. Japan Atomic Power was requested to produce a detailed assessment of the two faults under the reactors.

On 14 November 2012, the Nuclear Regulation Authority (NRA) of Japan decided to conduct a field-survey on the Tsuruga-site to check the faults under and around the plant. On 1 December, and of necessary, 2 December, the investigative team led by NRA Commissioner and seismologist Kunihiko Shimazaki and four other experts planned to examine the site to exclude that faults running directly underneath the two reactors might move in conjunction with the active Urazoko fault located only 250 meters from the buildings.

The result of these investigations was presented at a meeting of experts on 10 December 2012. The conclusion was that the "fault zone of crushed rock called D-1, located beneath the plant's No. 2 reactor, could move in conjunction with the Urazoko fault." Kunihiko Shimazaki, the NRA-commissioner at the head of the team, told at the meeting, "that what appeared to be an extended section of D-1 had moved as an active fault in the past, together with the movement of the Urazoko fault". Although some local residents were stunned by the NRA-led team's judgment, the mayor of Tsuruga, Mayor Kazuharu Kawase, said that the outcome was "very tough", but that additional investigations could possibly confirm the safety of the plants.

In a draft-report presented 28 January 2013, a panel of experts of the Japanese NRA again affirmed that the D-1 fault that runs under reactor No. 2 is likely to be geologically active, because it could move in conjunction with the active Urazoko-fault located only some 250 meters from both the No. 1 and No. 2 reactor buildings. Although other outside experts will be asked to check the report "to improve" the contents, Kunihiko Shimazaki, NRA-member and panel head said : "We're not expecting to spend much time, but I can't tell at this moment by when (the review will finish)."

On 22 January 2013, officials of Japan Atomic Power Co. received a version of the draft assessment report on the geologic faults running under the reactor complex. This was just a week before the report was scheduled to be made public by an NRA-appointed panel. Although the leaked information was not secret, for it contained a summary of public discussions, the incident was rather an embarrassment for the NRA because it undermined its policy of transparency and neutrality. Japan Atomic Power Co. was eager to get the information, because it wanted to prepare its counter arguments in the discussions. Although no money was paid for it, Tetsuo Nayuki, the NRA-official involved, was fired, because he violated the strict NRA regulations that, to ensure transparency, forbid single NRA staff members to meet officials of nuclear power plant operators. On 1 February, Nayuki was transferred to his former post at the Ministry of Education, Culture, Sports, Science and Technology.

On Friday, 8 March 2013, Japan Atomic Power Co. presented its latest analysis based on its ongoing geological investigation at the plant to the NRA-panel. According to JAPCO, the D-1 was not active and there was no need to refer to K because it did move in earlier times. But although the content of the report could be improved in a way that it would be more comprehensible to the public, the NRA did not expect that the meeting would change earlier conclusions. At the next meeting of the panel, the report was expected to be finalized and submitted to the NRA. After this, the NRA would decide whether the reactors could be reactivated or not. In a statement, JAPCO was "extremely" disappointed that the panel had not taken into account the important data provided by the operator. JAPCO made a "strong request" for another possibility for discussions. On 19 April 2013, the NRA inspection team told JAPC that it would not accept the power company's refutation of the NRA-report, stating the high possibility of an active fault lying under reactor No. 2 reactor, because the arguments of the power company were unclear. Although a 24 April-meeting was planned for another hearing, it was unlikely that the NRA-team would alter its position.

On 15 May 2013, the experts appointed by the Nuclear Regulation Authority presented their final report. They concluded that the No. 2 reactor was located right above an active fault, which could undermine its safety. This made it more likely that this unit might be shut down permanently. The expected costs of this could easily lead to a bankruptcy of its owner.

=== D1-fault declared seismic active by the NRA ===
On 22 May 2013 the NRA accepted the conclusions of the panel of experts, that the nr.2 reactor was built on an active fault named D-1. It also asked that Japan Atomic Power should study the impact at the spent fuel pool inside the No. 2 reactor building in case the fault would move. Japan Atomic Power criticized this decision that the approval of the report was "extremely inappropriate" because the course of the discussions was not studied in detail by the NRA, and that the issue would be further discussed when at the end of June the results of the investigations by Japan Atomic Power would be clear. One day earlier experts hired by the operator of the nuclear power plant had asked the NRA to postpone the decision, because they found there were insufficient data to do so.

The expected costs of decommissioning was to bring extra financial troubles for the company. Reactor nr.2 had only been in action about 26 years, instead of the 40 years it was designed for. And while it appeared to be very difficult to restart the other reactors, Japan Atomic Power could not sell any electricity, and survived only on the basic fees it received from its major stockholders.

In March 2015 the Nuclear Regulation Authority (NRA) accepted an expert report that concluded the plant is on an active fault.

In February 2020 the NRA accused Japan Atomic Power of modifying geological data used to determine whether the fault was active or not. The NRA had found that part of the data was deleted and rewritten in documents recently submitted to the NRA. Japan Atomic Power apologized for the "inappropriate handling of data" but stated it had not been done deliberately.

In seeking approval to restart the reactor under stricter regulations imposed following the 2011 Fukushima nuclear accident, Japan Atomic Power has been trying to disprove geological expert opinion, published in March 2015, that the fault is active.

In August 2021 the chairman of the NRA, Toyoshi Fuketa, said that the company's explanation that a change in the presentation of the seismic data was unintentional was "preposterous". The NRA halted the restart Unit 2 because of tampering with data showing a seismic fault line is active.

On August 28 2024, NRA ruled that reactor No. 2 cannot be switched back on due to the risks an active seismic fault.

On November 13, 2024, NRA has officially decided in its review report that Tsuruga Unit 2 does not comply with the new regulatory standards because it cannot deny the existence of an active fault directly below the reactor. This means that Unit 2 will not be allowed to restart.

== See also ==
- Monju Nuclear Power Plant
- Generation III reactor
- List of nuclear power plants in Japan
