= Mitsubishi FBR Systems =

Company

Mitsubishi FBR Systems, Inc. (MFBR) is a company formed on July 1, 2007, by Mitsubishi Heavy Industries to develop Fast breeder reactor technology. The establishment of the company was based on the April 2007 decision by the Japanese government to select Mitsubishi as the core company for FBR development. Expectations are for a demonstration reactor for launching by 2025 and a full commercial plant by 2050, and for FBRs to eventually supersede Light water reactor technology in Japan.

- Capitalization: 100 million yen
- Stock holders: Currently exclusively Mitsubishi Heavy Industries, but there are plans to eventually accept investments from Japanese electric utility companies
- Employees: 50, expanding to 160 by 2015
- Location: Jingū-mae (神宮前) in Shibuya, Tokyo
- President: Keizō Okada, the General Manager of the MHI Nuclear Systems Engineering Department

The successor to Monju Nuclear Power Plant had been expected to be a larger demonstration plant to be completed around 2025, built Mitsubishi FBR. However, in 2014 Japan agreed to cooperate in developing the emergency reactor cooling system, and in a few other areas, with the French ASTRID demonstration sodium-cooled fast breeder reactor, which was subsequently cancelled in August 2019.

In 2016, the development of Japanese fast reactors halted as a result of the government decision to decommission the Monju Nuclear Power Plant following problems with the plant including sodium leakage.

In January 2022, Mitsubishi Heavy Industries and Mitsubishi FBR Systems signed a Memorandum of Understanding with TerraPower to cooperate on the development of sodium-cooled fast reactors. Under the agreement TerraPower would acquire Japanese know-how and test facilities related to fast reactors.

== See also ==
- Jōyō
- Fukushima nuclear accident
