= Vandellòs Nuclear Power Plant =

Nuclear power plant in Spain

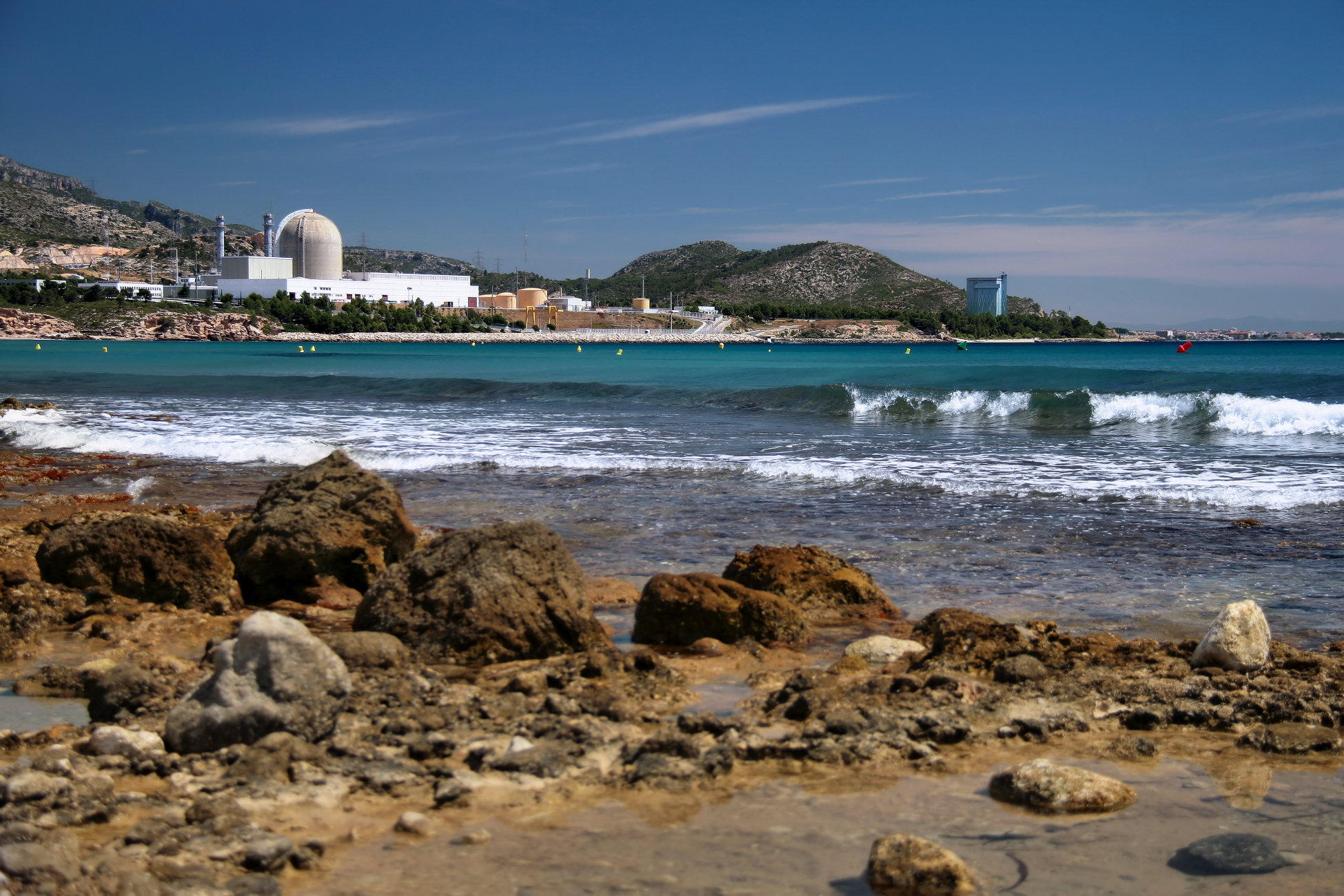
- Country: Spain
- Coordinates: 40°57′5″N 0°52′0″E
- Status: Operational
- Construction began: 1967
- Commission date: August 2, 1972
- Owner: Endesa (72%)
- Operator: ANAV

Power generation
- Units operational: 1 x 1087 MW
- Units decommissioned: 1 x 500 MW
- Nameplate capacity: 1,045 MW
- Annual net output: 7,023 GWh

External links
- Website: www.anav.es/esp/a0001.htm
- Commons: Related media on Commons

The Vandellòs Nuclear Power Plant is a nuclear power plant in Vandellòs located close to the Coll de Balaguer pass (Baix Camp comarca) in Catalonia, Spain.

Unit one was a 508 MWe carbon dioxide gas cooled reactor modeled on the UNGG reactor at the Saint Laurent Nuclear Power Plant in France. It was shut down on 31 July 1990, following an incident that damaged one of its two turbogenerators on 19 October 1989. Important nuclear safety functions in the plant were impaired by the fire, and the event was later classified as a level 3 event in the International Nuclear Event Scale. Its radioactive machinery was dismantled by 2003. It is expected that the passive equipment's radioactivity has decayed enough to be economically handled by the 2030s for these larger structures to be removed.

Unit two is a 1087 MWe PWR. The station's owners are: 72% Endesa and 28% Iberdrola.

== See also ==
- Nuclear power in Spain
