= International Nuclear and Radiological Event Scale =

Scale to enable communication of safety information in nuclear accidents

A representation of the INES levels

The International Nuclear and Radiological Event Scale (INES) was introduced in 1990 by the International Atomic Energy Agency (IAEA) in order to enable prompt communication of safety and significant information in case of nuclear accidents.

The scale is intended to be logarithmic, similar to the moment magnitude scale that is used to describe the comparative magnitude of earthquakes. Each increasing level represents an accident approximately ten times as severe as the previous level. Compared to earthquakes, where the event intensity can be quantitatively evaluated, the level of severity of a human-made disaster, such as a nuclear accident, is more subject to interpretation. Because of this subjectivity, the INES level of an incident is assigned well after the occurrence. The scale is therefore intended to assist in disaster-aid deployment.

== Details ==
A number of criteria and indicators are defined to assure coherent reporting of nuclear events by different official authorities. There are seven nonzero levels on the INES scale: three incident-levels and four accident-levels. There is also a level 0.

The International Nuclear and Radiological Event Scale (INES) is the primary form of categorizing the potential health and environmental effects of a nuclear or radiological event and communicating it to the public. The scale, which was developed in 1990 by the International Atomic Energy Agency and the Nuclear Energy Agency of the Organization for Economic Co-operation and Development, classifies these nuclear accidents based on the potential impact of the fallout: people and the environment (unplanned release of radioactive material outside the installation), radiological barriers and control (unplanned spread of radioactive material within the installation), defence-in-depth (how effectively existing safety measures functioned).

| Level | Classification | Description | Examples (Note: Except otherwise indicated, these enumerations are non-exhaustive lists.) |
|---|---|---|---|
| 7 | Major accident | Impact on people and environment: Major release of radioactive material with widespread health and environmental effects requiring implementation of planned and extended countermeasures. | There have been two Level 7 accidents: Chernobyl disaster, 26 April 1986. Unsafe conditions during a test procedure resulted in a powerful steam explosion and fire that released a significant fraction of core material into the environment, resulting in an eventual death toll of 4,000–27,000. As a result of the plumes of radioisotopes, a 30 km (19 mi) exclusion zone around the reactor was established.; Fukushima nuclear disaster, a series of events beginning on 11 March 2011. Major damage to the backup power and containment systems caused by the 2011 Tōhoku earthquake and tsunami resulted in overheating and leaking from some of the Fukushima I nuclear plant's reactors. Fukushima is widely accepted as having zero deaths due to radiation poisoning, although there was one report of cancer that was attributed to radiation. A temporary exclusion zone of 20 km (12 mi) was established around the plant. |
| 6 | Serious accident | Impact on people and environment: Significant release of radioactive material likely to require implementation of planned countermeasures. | There has been one Level 6 accident: Kyshtym disaster at Mayak Chemical Combine (MCC) Soviet Union, 29 September 1957. A failed cooling system at a military nuclear reprocessing facility caused an explosion with an energy equivalent of 70–100 tons of TNT. About 70 to 80 metric tons of highly radioactive material were carried into the surrounding environment. At least 22 villages were evacuated. |
| 5 | Accident with wider consequences | Impact on people and environment: Limited release of radioactive material likely to require implementation of some planned countermeasures.; Several deaths from radiation.; Impact on radiological barriers and control: Severe damage to reactor core.; Release of large quantities of radioactive material within an installation with a high probability of significant public exposure. This could arise from a major criticality accident or fire. | First Chalk River accident, Chalk River, Ontario (Canada), 12 December 1952. Reactor core damaged.; Windscale fire at Sellafield (Cumbria), United Kingdom, 10 October 1957. Annealing of graphite moderator at a military air-cooled reactor caused the graphite and the metallic uranium fuel to catch fire, releasing radioactive pile material as dust into the environment. It was estimated that 100 cancer deaths could have been caused by the incident. However later epidemiological studies failed to find such an increase.; Three Mile Island accident near Harrisburg, Pennsylvania (United States), 28 March 1979. A combination of design and operator errors caused a gradual loss of coolant, leading to a partial meltdown. The amounts of radioactive gases released into the atmosphere are still unknown, so injuries and illnesses that have been attributed to this accident are only estimates from epidemiological studies.; Goiânia accident (Brazil), 13 September 1987. An unsecured caesium chloride radiation source left in an abandoned hospital was recovered by scavenger thieves unaware of its nature and sold at a scrapyard. 249 people were contaminated and 4 died. |
| 4 | Accident with local consequences | Impact on people and environment: Minor release of radioactive material unlikely to result in implementation of planned countermeasures other than local food controls.; At least one death from radiation.; Impact on radiological barriers and control: Fuel melt or damage to fuel resulting in more than 0.1% release of core inventory.; Release of significant quantities of radioactive material within an installation with a high probability of significant public exposure. | Sellafield (Cumbria, United Kingdom) – five incidents from 1955 to 1979.; SL-1 Experimental Power Station (United States) – 1961, reactor reached prompt criticality, killing three operators.; Saint-Laurent Nuclear Power Plant (France) – 1969, partial core damage; 1980, graphite overheating with partial core damage.; Lucens reactor (Switzerland) – 1969, blocked coolant channel caused fuel assembly to melt and catch fire, no radiation exposure to staff or public; Jaslovské Bohunice (Czechoslovakia) – 1977, partial core damage resulted in minor release of radiation to reactor building.; Andreev Bay nuclear accident (Soviet Union) – 1982, a spent nuclear fuel storage facility was damaged and caused approximately 700,000 tonnes (770,000 tons) of highly radioactive water to leak into the Barents Sea.; Buenos Aires (Argentina) – 1983, criticality accident on research reactor RA-2 during fuel rod rearrangement killed one operator and injured two others.; Tokaimura nuclear accident (Japan) – 1999, three inexperienced operators at a reprocessing facility caused a criticality accident; two of them died.; Mayapuri (India) – 2010, a university irradiator was sold for scrap and dismantled by dealers unaware of the hazardous materials. |
| 3 | Serious incident | Impact on people and environment: Exposure in excess of ten times the statutory annual limit for workers.; Non-lethal deterministic health effect (e.g., burns) from radiation.; Impact on radiological barriers and control: Exposure rates of more than 1 Sv/h in an operating area.; Severe contamination in an area not expected by design, with a low probability of significant public exposure.; Impact on defence-in-depth: Near-accident at a nuclear power plant with no safety provisions remaining.; Lost or stolen highly radioactive sealed source.; Misdelivered highly radioactive sealed source without adequate procedures in place to handle it. | Vandellòs I nuclear incident in Vandellòs (Spain), 1989; fire destroyed many control systems; the reactor was shut down.; Davis–Besse Nuclear Power Station (United States), 2002; negligent inspections resulted in corrosion through 6 in (150 mm) of the carbon steel reactor head leaving only 3/8-inch (9.5 mm) of stainless steel cladding holding back the high-pressure reactor coolant.; Paks Nuclear Power Plant (Hungary), 2003; fuel rod damage in a cleaning tank.; THORP plant, Sellafield (Cumbria, United Kingdom), 2005; very large leak of a highly radioactive solution held within containment.; Fukushima Daini Nuclear Power Plant (Japan), 2011; loss of coolant water in units 1, 2 and 4 |
| 2 | Incident | Impact on people and environment: Exposure of a member of the public in excess of 10 mSv.; Exposure of a worker in excess of the statutory annual limits.; Impact on radiological barriers and control: Radiation levels in an operating area of more than 50 mSv/h.; Significant contamination within the facility into an area not expected by design.; Impact on defence-in-depth: Significant failures in safety provisions but with no actual consequences.; Found highly-radioactive sealed orphan source, device or transport package with safety provisions intact.; Inadequate packaging of a highly radioactive sealed source. | Gundremmingen Nuclear Power Plant (Germany) 1977; weather caused short-circuit of high-voltage power lines and rapid shutdown of the reactor.; Hunterson B nuclear power station (Ayrshire, United Kingdom) 1998; Emergency diesel generators for reactor cooling pumps, failed to start after multiple grid failures during the Boxing Day Storm of 1998.; Shika Nuclear Power Plant (Japan) 1999; criticality incident caused by dropped control rods, covered up until 2007.; Blayais Nuclear Power Plant flood (France) December 1999; Forsmark Nuclear Power Plant (Sweden) July 2006; backup generator failure; two were online but the fault could have caused all four to fail.; Ascó Nuclear Power Plant (Spain) April 2008; radioactive contamination.; Sellafield (Cumbria, United Kingdom) 2017; confirmed exposure to radiation of individuals which exceed or are expected to exceed, the dose limits (2 incidents in this year).; Sellafield Magnox Swarf Storage Silo (Cumbria, United Kingdom) 2019; confirmed silo liquor imbalance caused by a leak in the legacy storage facility leading to contamination below ground level. |
| 1 | Anomaly | Impact on defence-in-depth: Overexposure of a member of the public in excess of statutory annual limits.; Minor problems with safety components with significant defence-in-depth remaining.; Lost or stolen low-activity radioactive source, device, or transport package.; (Arrangements for reporting minor events to the public differ from country to country.) | Tricastin (Drôme, France), July 2008; leak of 18,000 L (4,000 imp gal; 4,800 US gal) of water containing 75 kg (165 lb) of unenriched uranium into the environment.; Gravelines (Nord, France), 8 August 2009; during the annual fuel bundle exchange in reactor 1, a fuel bundle snagged on to the internal structure. Operations were stopped, the reactor building was evacuated and isolated in accordance with operating procedures.; Penly (Seine-Maritime, France) 5 April 2012; an abnormal leak on the primary circuit of the reactor 2 was found in the evening of 5 April 2012 after a fire in reactor 2 around noon was extinguished.; Sellafield 15 May 2016; Loss of active ventilation within the Magnox Swarf Storage Silo. Extract fans were switched off for 16 hours in order to undertake some improvements to the ventilation system, but when it was restarted the system indicated zero flow.; Sellafield (Cumbria, United Kingdom) 1 March 2018; Due to cold weather, a pipe failed causing water from the contaminated basement to flow into a concrete compound, which was subsequently discharged into the Irish Sea.; Hunterston B nuclear power station (Ayrshire, United Kingdom) 2 May 2018; Cracks of the graphite bricks in Advanced Gas-cooled Reactor 3 were found during an inspection. About 370 fractures were discovered, above the operational limit of 350.; Sellafield Legacy Ponds sump tank (Cumbria, United Kingdom) 2019; detected liquid levels in a concrete sump tank have fallen. |
| 0 | Deviation | No safety significance. | 13 February 2006: Fire in Nuclear Waste Volume Reduction Facilities of the Japanese Atomic Energy Agency (JAEA) in Tokaimura.; 17 December 2006, Atucha, Argentina: Reactor shutdown due to tritium increase in reactor compartment.; 4 June 2008: Krško, Slovenia: Leakage from the primary cooling circuit.; 10 December 2020: Eurajoki, Finland: Olkiluoto reactor shutdown due to dissolved filter substances in reactor water. |

== Out of scale ==
There are also events of no safety relevance, characterized as "out of scale", as they did not pose any possible radiological hazard.

Examples:
- 5 March 1999: San Onofre, United States: Discovery of suspicious item, originally thought to be a bomb, in a nuclear power plant.
- 29 September 1999: H.B. Robinson, United States: A tornado sighting within the protected area of the nuclear power plant.
- 17 November 2002, Natural Uranium Oxide Fuel Plant at the Nuclear Fuel Complex in Hyderabad, India: A chemical explosion at a fuel fabrication facility.

== Criticism ==
Deficiencies in the existing INES have emerged through comparisons between the 1986 Chernobyl disaster, which had severe and widespread consequences to humans and the environment, and the 2011 Fukushima nuclear disaster, which caused one fatality and comparatively small (10%) release of radiological material into the environment. The Fukushima Daiichi nuclear accident was originally rated as INES 5, but then upgraded to INES 7 (the highest level) when the events of units 1, 2 and 3 were combined into a single event and the combined release of radiological material was the determining factor for the INES rating.

One study found that the INES scale of the IAEA is highly inconsistent, and the scores provided by the IAEA incomplete, with many events not having an INES rating. Further, the actual accident damage values do not reflect the INES scores. A quantifiable, continuous scale might be preferable to the INES.

Three arguments have been made: First, the scale is essentially a discrete qualitative ranking, not defined beyond event level 7. Second, it was designed as a public relations tool, not an objective scientific scale. Third, its most serious shortcoming is that it conflates magnitude and intensity. An alternative nuclear accident magnitude scale (NAMS) was proposed by British nuclear safety expert David Smythe to address these issues.

== Alternatives ==
=== Nuclear Accident Magnitude Scale ===
The Nuclear Accident Magnitude Scale (NAMS) is an alternative to INES, proposed by David Smythe in 2011 as a response to the Fukushima nuclear accident. There were some concerns that INES was used in a confusing manner, and NAMS was intended to address the perceived INES shortcomings.

As Smythe pointed out, the INES scale ends at 7; a more severe accident than Fukushima in 2011 or Chernobyl in 1986 would also be measured as INES category 7. In addition, it is discontinuous, not allowing a fine-grained comparison of nuclear incidents and accidents. But the most pressing item identified by Smythe is that INES conflates magnitude with intensity; a distinction long made by seismologists to compare earthquakes. In that subject area, magnitude describes the physical energy released by an earthquake, while the intensity focuses on the effects of the earthquake. By analogy, a nuclear incident with a high magnitude (e.g. a core meltdown) may not result in an intense radioactive contamination, as the incident at the Swiss research reactor in Lucens shows – yet it resides in INES category 4, together with the Windscale fire of 1957, which caused significant contamination outside of its facility.

The definition of the NAMS scale is:

NAMS = log_{10}(20 × R)

with R being the radioactivity being released in terabecquerels, calculated as the equivalent dose of iodine-131. Furthermore, only the atmospheric release affecting the area outside the nuclear facility is considered for calculating the NAMS, giving a NAMS score of 0 to all incidents which do not affect the outside. The factor of 20 assures that both the INES and the NAMS scales reside in a similar range, aiding a comparison between accidents. An atmospheric release of any radioactivity will only occur in the INES categories 4 to 7, while NAMS does not have such a limitation.

The NAMS scale still does not take into account the radioactive contamination of liquids such as an ocean, sea, river or groundwater pollution in proximity to any nuclear power plant.

The estimation of magnitude seems to be related to the problematic definition of a radiological equivalence between different types of involved isotopes and the variety of paths by which activity might eventually be ingested, e.g. eating fish or through the food chain.

Smythe lists these incidents: Chernobyl, former USSR 1986 (M = 8.0), Three Mile Island, USA (M = 7.9), Fukushima-Daiichi, Japan 2011 (M = 7.5), Kyshtym, former USSR 1957 (M = 7.3).

== See also ==
- Nuclear meltdown
  - Core damage frequency
  - Fuel element failure
  - Loss-of-coolant accident
- Nuclear power
- Nuclear power debate
- Radioactive contamination
- Radioactive waste
- Vulnerability of nuclear plants to attack
- NRC Emergency Classifications
- Nuclear and radiation accidents and incidents
  - Lists of nuclear disasters and radioactive incidents
  - List of civilian nuclear accidents
  - List of civilian radiation accidents
  - List of military nuclear accidents
    - United States military nuclear incident terminology
- Lists of nuclear reactors
- Nuclear safety and security
- Criticality accident
- List of hydroelectric power station failures
