= Jōyō (nuclear reactor) =

Test sodium-cooled fast reactor in Ōarai, Ibaraki, Japan

Coordinates: 36.268039°N 140.554093°E

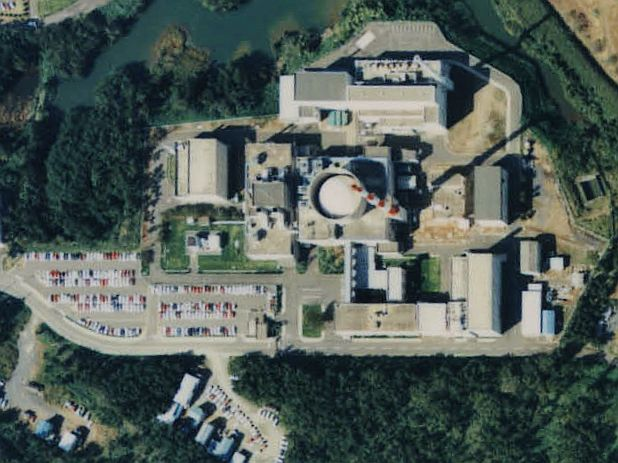
Experimental Fast Reactor Jōyō Made based on National Land Image Information (Color Aerial Photographs), Ministry of Land, Infrastructure, Transport and Tourism

Jōyō (常陽) is a test sodium-cooled fast reactor located in Ōarai, Ibaraki, Japan, operated by the Japan Atomic Energy Agency. The name comes from the previous country name of the area around Ibaraki.

It was made with the purpose of doing tests on and advancing the development of that type of reactor, as an irradiation test facility for construction materials. It also does tests with the nuclear fuel as well as activation experiments.

The reactor has gone through 3 different core changes.

- MK-I April 24, 1977 - January 1, 1982 (the power was 50-75 MWt)
- MK-II November 22, 1982 - September 12, 1997. This core surpassed 50,000 hours of operating time with 100 MWt.
- MK-III July 2, 2003–2007 (140-150 MWt).

The current core provides the neutron flux of 4×10^{15} cm^{−2}s^{−1} for E>0.1 MeV.

After an incident in 2007, the reactor is suspended for repairing, recovery works were planned to be completed in 2014.

Following the closure of the unsuccessful follow-on fast breeder reactor Monju in 2016, a decision was made to continue research at Jōyō.

On May 24, 2023 the Nuclear Regulation Authority approved a draft report on the safety screening of the reactor which concludes that the countermeasures implemented against sodium fires or core damages meet the new safety standards. The draft is expected to be formally approved after soliciting public comments.

Joyo (Japan’s only experimental fast reactor) is expected to be restarted at the end of 2026. The reactor will contribute towards research of medical radioisotopes production for cancer treatment and research on radiotoxicity of radioactive waste.

== See also ==
- Monju
- Nuclear power in Japan
