= Urasoko fault =

Urasoko fault 浦底断層 (Urasoko Dansō) or Urasoko fault system is a seismic fault (system) running for 39 kilometers near Tsuruga, Japan. Combined with the faults of the system, there are an additional 25 km of faults. It is notable in that it runs 250 meters from Unit #2 of the Tsuruga Nuclear Power Station, Tsuruga Nuclear Power Plant. It was determined that it is capable of triggering a 7.4 magnitude quake.
