= JCO (company) =

Japanese nuclear fuel cycle company

JCO is a Japanese nuclear fuel cycle company established in October 1979 as a wholly owned subsidiary of Sumitomo Metal Mining Co., Ltd. as Japan Nuclear Fuel Conversion Co. 日本核燃料コンバージョン (Nihon Kakunenryō Konbājon). stock capitalization was US$1 billion.

== Timeline ==
- 1979 JCO was founded
- 1980 Sumitomo Metal Mining Co., Ltd. conversion activities were handed over to JCO
- 1983 The second factory building at Tokaimura
- 1998 The name was changed to just JCO
- 1999 Tokaimura nuclear accident
- 2003 Uranium conversion activities stopped
