= Core damage frequency =

Risk assessment of the likelihood of a core damage accident

Core damage frequency (CDF) is a term used in probabilistic risk assessment (PRA) that indicates the likelihood of an accident that would cause severe damage to a nuclear fuel in a nuclear reactor core. Core damage accidents are considered extremely serious because severe damage to the fuel in the core prevents adequate heat removal or even safe shutdown, which can lead to a nuclear meltdown. Some sources on CDF consider core damage and core meltdown to be the same thing, and different methods of measurement are used between industries and nations, so the primary value of the CDF number is in managing the risk of core accidents within a system and not necessarily to provide large-scale statistics.

An assessment of permanent or temporary changes in a nuclear power plant is performed to evaluate if such changes are within risk criteria. For example, the probability of core damage may increase while replacing a component, but the probability would be even higher if that component were to fail because it wasn't replaced. Risk measures, such as core damage frequency and large early release frequency (LERF), determine the risk criteria for such changes.

This risk analysis allows decision making of any changes within a nuclear power plant in accordance with legislation, safety margins, and performance strategies.

A 2003 study commissioned by the European Commission remarked that "core damage frequencies of 5 × 10^{−5} [per reactor-year] are a common result" or in other words, one core damage incident in 20,000 reactor years. A 2008 study performed by the Electric Power Research Institute, the estimated core damage frequency for the United States nuclear industry is estimated at once in 50,000 reactor years, or 2 × 10^{−5}.

Assuming there are 500 reactors in use in the world, the above CDF estimates mean that, statistically, one core damage incident would be expected to occur somewhere in the world every 40 years for the 2003 European Commission estimated average accident rate or every 100 years for the 2008 Electric Power Research Institute estimated average accident rate.

According to a 2011 report by the National Resources Defense Council, about 14,400 reactor years of commercial power operation have been accrued worldwide for 582 reactors. Of these 582 reactors, 11 have suffered from serious core damage. This historical data results in a 1954 to 2011 era average accident rate of 1 in every 1,309 reactor years (7.6 × 10^{−4} per reactor year CDF). In five of these accidents, the damage was light enough that the reactor was repaired and restarted.

During the 2011 earthquake and resultant 15+ meter tsunami on the east coast of Japan, the Fukushima I nuclear power plant suffered core damages at three of its six reactors after the emergency core cooling systems failed due to the extreme beyond design basis conditions. That is, the Fukushima plants did not consider a tsunami above 3.1 meters (10 ft) in their original design. These reactors were General Electric BWR-3 and BWR-4 reactors inside Mark I containment designs, which is common in the United States. However, all of these types of plants have varying designs due to regulations, individual utility preferences, and construction location. In 1995, Sandia National Laboratories estimated that the individual BWR-3 and BWR-4 reactors in the United States have a core damage frequency between 10^{−4} and 10^{−7}.

== See also ==
- Failure rate
- Nuclear reactor
- Nuclear reaction
- Nuclear power
