= Fukushima Daini Nuclear Power Plant =

Nuclear power plant in Japan

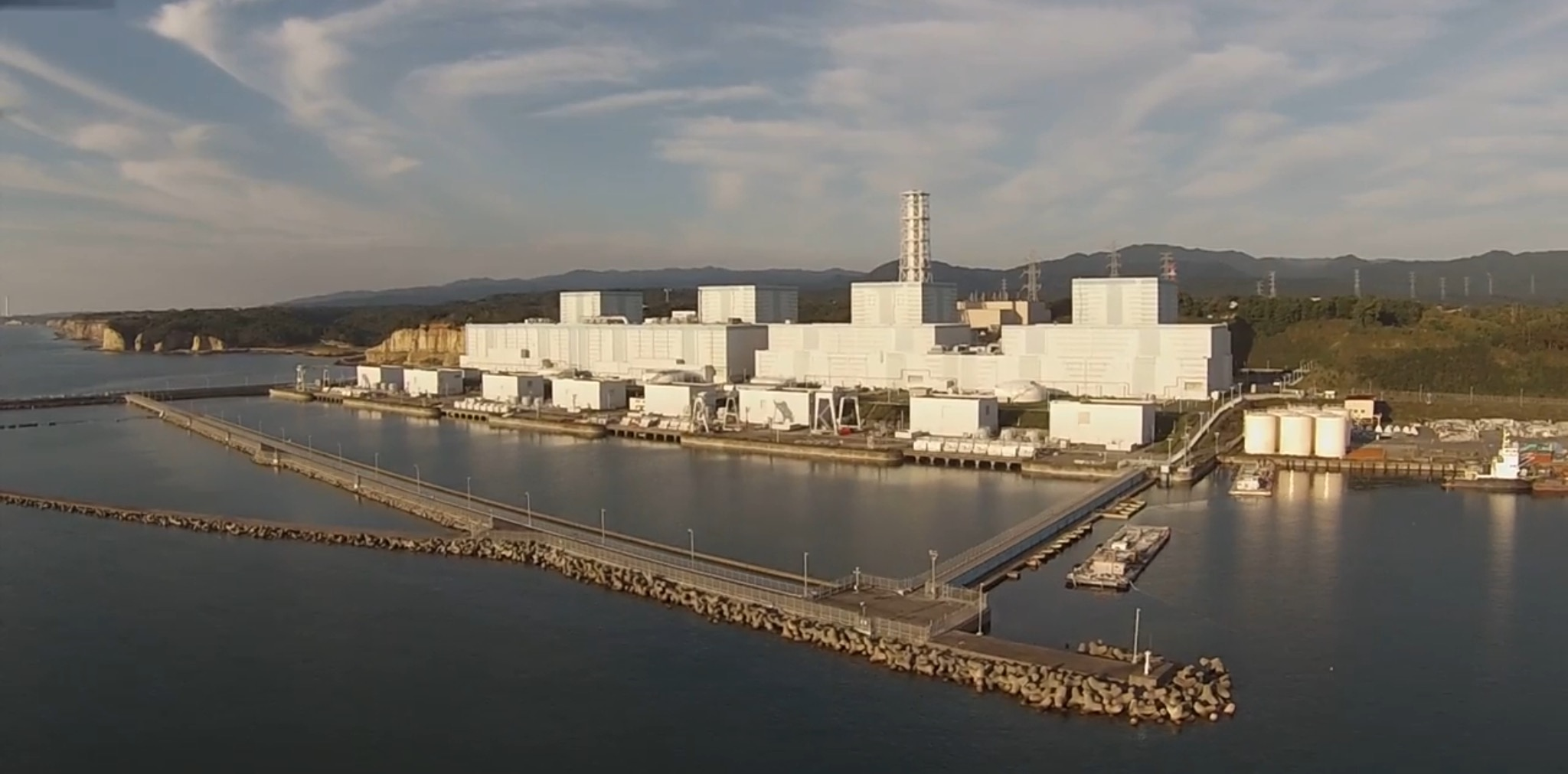
- The Fukushima II NPP, pictured in 2015
- Country: Japan
- Location: Naraha
- Coordinates: 37°18′59″N 141°1′32″E
- Status: Decommissioned
- Construction began: March 16, 1976
- Commission date: April 20, 1982
- Decommission date: September 30, 2019
- Owner: TEPCO
- Operator: Tokyo Electric Power Company

Nuclear power station
- Reactor type: BWR
- Reactor supplier: Toshiba; Hitachi

Power generation
- Units operational: 4 × 1,100 MW
- Nameplate capacity: 4,400 MW
- Capacity factor: 0%
- Annual net output: 0 GW·h

External links
- Website: Home page
- Commons: Related media on Commons

The Fukushima Daini Nuclear Power Plant (福島第二原子力発電所, Fukushima Daini Genshiryoku Hatsudensho; Fukushima II NPP, 2F) is a nuclear power plant located on a 150 ha (370-acre) site in the town of Naraha and Tomioka in the Futaba District of Fukushima Prefecture, Japan. The Tokyo Electric Power Company (TEPCO) runs the plant.

After the 2011 Tōhoku earthquake and tsunami, the four reactors at Fukushima Daini automatically shut down. While the sister plant Fukushima Daiichi Nuclear Power Plant, approximately 12 km (7.5 mi) to the north, suffered extensive damage, the Daini Plant was back under control within two days, reaching cold shutdown. The plant has not been operating since, and in July 2019 a decision to decommission the plant was made.

== Description ==
All reactors in the Fukushima II Nuclear Power Plant are BWR-5 type with electric power of 1,100 MW each (net output: 1,067 MW each).

The reactors for units 1 and 3 were supplied by Toshiba, and for units 2 and 4 by Hitachi. Units 1–3 were built by Kajima while the unit 4 was built by Shimizu and Takenaka.

Unit	First criticality	Installation costs (million yen/MW)	Reactor supplier	Architecture	Construction	Containment
1	31/07/1981	250	Toshiba	Toshiba	Kajima	Mark 2
2	23/06/1983	230	Hitachi	Hitachi	Kajima	Mark 2 advanced
3	14/12/1984	290	Toshiba	Toshiba	Kajima	Mark 2 advanced
4	17/12/1986	250	Hitachi	Hitachi	Shimizu; Takenaka	Mark 2 advanced

=== Electrical connections ===
The Fukushima Daini plant is connected to the rest of the power grid by the Tomioka Line (富岡線) to the Shin-Fukushima (New Fukushima) substation.

== Events ==
=== 1989 incident ===
In January 1989, an impeller blade on one of the reactor coolant pumps in Unit 3 broke at a weld, causing a large amount of metal debris to flow throughout the primary loop. As a result, the reactor was shut down for a considerable length of time.

=== 2011 earthquake and tsunami ===
The March 11, 2011 Tōhoku earthquake resulted in maximum horizontal ground accelerations of 0.21 g (2.10 m/s^{2}) to 0.28 (2.77 m/s^{2}) at the plant site, which is well below the design basis. The design basis accident for an earthquake was between 0.42 g (4.15 m/s^{2}) and 0.52 g (5.12 m/s^{2}) and for a tsunami was 5.2 m. All four units were automatically shut down (scram) immediately after the earthquake, and the diesel engines were started to power the reactor cooling. A worker died of injuries from the earthquake when he was trapped in the crane operating console of the exhaust stack.

The tsunami that followed the earthquake and inundated the plant was initially estimated by TEPCO to be 14 meters high, which would have been more than twice the designed height. Other sources give the tsunami height at Fukushima Daini plant at 9-meter-high, while the Fukushima Daiichi plant was hit by a 13-meter-high tsunami. The tsunami caused the plant's seawater pumps, used to cool reactors, to fail. Of the plant's four reactors, three were in danger of meltdown. One external high-voltage power line still functioned, allowing plant staff in the central control room to monitor data on internal reactor temperatures and water levels. 2,000 employees of the plant worked to stabilize the reactors. Some employees connected over 9 kilometers of cabling using 200-meter sections of cable, each weighing more than a ton, from their Rad Waste Building to other locations onsite.

The steam-powered reactor core isolation cooling system (RCIC) in all 4 units was activated and ran as needed to maintain water level. At the same time, operators utilized the safety relief valve systems to keep the reactor pressures from getting too high by dumping the heat to the suppression pools. In unit 3, one seawater pump remained operational and the residual heat removal system (RHR) was started to cool the suppression pool and later brought the reactor to cold shutdown on March 12. In units 1, 2, and 4 heat removal was unavailable, so the suppression pools began heating up and on March 12, the water temperature in the pools of units 1, 2, and 4 reached 100 °C between 05:30 and 06:10 JST, removing the ability to remove pressure from the reactor and drywell.

Operators had to also prepare an alternate injection line for each unit, as the RCIC can run indefinitely only while there is sufficient pressure and steam in the reactor to drive its turbine. Once the reactor pressure drops below a certain level, the RCIC shuts down automatically. The normal electrically driven Emergency Core Cooling Systems (ECCS) were for the most part unavailable due to the loss of the ultimate heat sink and damage to some of the electrical infrastructure. Operators prepared for this and set up an alternate injection line using a non-emergency system known as the Makeup Water Condensate (MUWC) system to maintain water level which was an accident mitigation method TEPCO put in place at all its nuclear plants. The system was started and stopped in all 4 units, including unit 3, as needed to maintain the water level. The RCICs in each unit later shut down due to low reactor pressure. The MUWC and the makeup water purification and filtering (MUPF) systems were also used to try to cool the suppression pool and drywell in addition to the reactor to prevent the drywell pressure from getting too high. Operators were later able to restore the High Pressure Core Spray portion of the ECCS in unit 4 and switched emergency water injection for unit 4 from the MUWC system to the HPCS.

While the water level was maintained in the three cores using emergency water injection, pressures in the containment vessel continued to rise due to lack of suppression pool cooling and the operators prepared to vent the containments making restoration of heat removal urgent. Unit 1 was prioritized as it had the highest drywell pressure.

==== Cold shutdown ====
The ultimate heat sink was restored on March 13 when the service seawater system pumps in the pump room were repaired in units 1, 2 and 4. This allowed the restoration of the normal ECCS and heat removal systems to operable status and cooling was switched to the Residual Heat Removal System (RHR) portion of the ECCS. The RHR systems were first activated to cool down the suppression pools (torus) and drywells to operable status, and water injections were made to the reactors using the Low Pressure Coolant Injection (LPCI) mode as needed. When the suppression pool was cooled down to below 100 °C, the RHR was switched to the shutdown cooling mode and brought the reactors to a cold shutdown.

Coolant temperatures below 100 °C (cold shutdown) were reached in reactor 2 about 34 hours after the emergency shut down (scram). Reactors 1 and 3 followed at 1:24 and 3:52 on March 14 and Reactor 4 at 7:00 on March 15. By March 15, all four reactors of Fukushima II reached cold shutdown, which remained non-threatening.

The loss of cooling water at reactors 1, 2 and 4 was classified a level 3 on the International Nuclear Event Scale (serious incident) by Japanese authorities as of March 18.

Officials made preparations for release of pressure from the plant on March 12, but no pressure release was necessary. An evacuation order was issued to the people living within 3 kilometres (1.9 mi) of the plant, subsequently expanded to 10 km (6.2 mi). Air traffic was restricted in a 10 km (6.2 mi) radius around the plant, according to a NOTAM. These zones were later superseded by the 20 km evacuation and 30 km no-fly zones around Fukushima Daiichi on March 12 and 15, respectively.

As of June 2011, 7,000 tons of seawater from the tsunami remained in the plant. The plant planned to release it all back into the ocean, as the tanks and structures holding the water were beginning to corrode. Approximately 3,000 tons of the water was found to contain radioactive substances, and Japan's Fisheries Agency refused permission to release that water back into the ocean.

==== Restoration ====
On December 26, 2011, the Prime Minister officially cancelled the nuclear emergency declaration for the Fukushima Daini plant officially ending the incident. On February 8, 2012, the plant was opened to news media for the first time since the 2011 Tōhoku earthquake and tsunami.

The evacuation order was partly rescinded for Daini evacuees in August 2012. Some of the residents, such as the 7200 at Naraha, were permitted to return during daylight hours only, but others were ordered to remain away. The area did not become seriously contaminated and was safe to visit without protective clothing. In 2015, the evacuation order for Naraha was completely lifted, allowing residents to return and reconstruction efforts to begin. Naraha is the first of a number of towns in the area to have had its evacuation order removed.

=== 2016 earthquake ===
On Tuesday, November 22, 2016, a magnitude 6.9 earthquake struck Japan 37 km (23 mi) east southeast of Namie, Fukushima Prefecture at a depth of 11.3 km (7.0 mi). The shock had a maximum intensity of VII (Very strong). 14 people were injured and more than 1,900 homes briefly lost electricity. Though a warning of a possible tsunami of 3 m (9.8 ft) in height was issued, a 60 cm (24 in) wave was reported by NHK in the port of Onahama of Iwaki, Fukushima; a 90 cm (35 in) wave hit Sōma, Fukushima; and another wave 1 m (3 ft 3 in) in height struck the Fukushima Daiichi Nuclear Power Plant site after the 6.9 shock. Chief Cabinet Secretary Yoshihide Suga said that the third reactor's spent fuel pool cooling systems at Fukushima Daini had stopped as a result of the earthquake; TEPCO later reported the restart of the spent fuel cooling system after only 100 minutes of stoppage.

=== Decommissioning ===
On 31 July 2019, the TEPCO board of directors decided to decommission the plant, in response to local demands for a decision. Decommissioning is expected to take more than 40 years to complete, and will include moving spent nuclear fuel from spent fuel pools to on-site dry cask storage.

== See also ==
- Nuclear power in Japan
- Fukushima Daiichi nuclear disaster
- List of boiling water reactors
- List of nuclear power plants in Japan
- Lists of nuclear disasters and radioactive incidents
- List of civilian nuclear accidents
