= Economic Simplified Boiling Water Reactor =

Nuclear reactor design

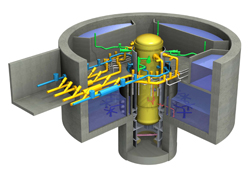
Cut-away view of a GE-Hitachi Nuclear Energy ESBWR reactor containment design

The Economic Simplified Boiling Water Reactor (ESBWR) is a passively safe generation III+ reactor design derived from its predecessor, the Simplified Boiling Water Reactor (SBWR) and from the Advanced Boiling Water Reactor (ABWR). All are designs by GE Vernova Hitachi Nuclear Energy (GVH), and are based on previous Boiling Water Reactor designs.

== Passive safety system ==
The passive nuclear safety systems in an ESBWR operate without using any pumps, which creates increased design safety, integrity, and reliability, while simultaneously reducing overall reactor cost. It also uses natural circulation to drive coolant flow within the reactor pressure vessel (RPV); this results in fewer systems to maintain, and precludes significant BWR casualties such as recirculation line breaks. There are no circulation pumps or associated piping, power supplies, heat exchangers, instrumentation, or controls needed for these systems.

ESBWR's passive safety systems include a combination of three systems that allow for the efficient transfer of decay heat (created from nuclear decay) from the reactor to pools of water outside containment – the Isolation Condenser System, the Gravity Driven Cooling System, and the Passive Containment Cooling System. These systems utilize natural circulation based on simple laws of physics to transfer the decay heat outside containment while maintaining water levels inside the reactor, keeping the nuclear fuel submerged in water and adequately cooled.

In events where the reactor coolant pressure boundary remains intact, the Isolation Condenser System (ICS) is used to remove decay heat from the reactor and transfer it outside containment. The ICS system is a closed loop system that connects the reactor pressure vessel to a heat exchanger located in the upper elevation of the reactor building. Steam leaves the reactor through the ICS piping and travels to the ICS heat exchangers which are submerged in a large pool. The steam is condensed in the heat exchangers and the denser condensate then flows back down to the reactor to complete the cooling loop. Reactor coolant is cycled through this flow path to provide continuous cooling and to add water to the reactor core.

In cases where the reactor coolant pressure boundary does not remain intact and water inventory in the core is being lost, the Passive Containment Cooling System (PCCS) and Gravity Driven Cooling System (GDCS) work in concert to maintain the water level in the core and remove decay heat from the reactor by transferring it outside containment.

If the water level inside the reactor pressure vessel drops to a predetermined level, due to the loss of water inventory, the reactor is depressurized and the GDCS is initiated. It consists of large pools of water inside containment located above the reactor that are connected to the reactor pressure vessel. When the GDCS system is initiated, gravity forces water to flow from the pools into the reactor. The pools are sized to provide sufficient amounts of water to maintain the water at a level above the top of the nuclear fuel. After the reactor has been depressurized, the decay heat is transferred to the containment as water inside the reactor boils and exits the reactor pressure vessel into the containment in the form of steam.

The PCCS consists of a set of heat exchangers located in the upper portion of the reactor building. The steam from the reactor rises through the containment to the PCCS heat exchangers where the steam is condensed. The condensate then drains from the PCCS heat exchangers back to the GDCS pools where it completes the cycle and drains back to the reactor pressure vessel.

Both the ICS and PCCS heat exchangers are submerged in a pool of water large enough to provide 72 hours of reactor decay heat removal capability. The pool is vented to the atmosphere and is located outside of the containment. The combination of these features allows the pool to be refilled easily with low pressure water sources and installed piping.

The reactor core is shorter than in conventional BWR plants to reduce the pressure drop over the fuel, thereby enabling natural circulation. There are 1,132 fuel rod bundles and the thermal power is 4,500 MWth in the standardized SBWR. The nominal output is rated at 1594 MWe gross and 1535 MWe net, yielding an overall plant Carnot efficiency of approximately 35%.

In case of an accident, the ESBWR can remain in a safe, stable state for 72 hours without any operator action or even electrical power. ESBWR safety systems are designed to operate normally in the event of station blackout, which prevented proper functioning of the emergency core cooling systems at the Fukushima Daiichi Nuclear Power Plant. Below the vessel, there is a piping structure (core catcher) that allows for cooling of the core during any very severe accident. These pipes facilitate cooling above and below the molten core with water. The final safety evaluation report accepted by the NRC reports an overall core damage frequency of 1.65 * 10^{−8} per year (i.e., roughly once every 60 million years).

Similarly to the ABWR, the containment is inerted with nitrogen before operation to prevent fires, and can be deinerted after reactor shutdown for maintenance. As this BWR can not be controlled using flow rate control as it lacks recirculation pumps, it can instead be controlled with the temperature of the feedwater entering the reactor.

== NRC design review process ==
The ESBWR received a positive Safety Evaluation Report and Final Design Approval on March 9, 2011. On June 7, 2011, the NRC completed its public comment period. Final rule was issued on September 16, 2014, after two outstanding problems with GE-Hitachi's modeling of loads on the steam dryer were solved.

In January 2014, GE Hitachi paid $2.7 million to resolve a lawsuit alleging it made false claims to the NRC about its analysis of the steam dryer.

The NRC granted design approval in September 2014.

=== Construction and operation licences ===
However, in September 2015, at the request of owner Entergy, the NRC withdrew the Combined Construction and Operating License application for the first proposed ESBWR unit at Grand Gulf Nuclear Generating Station.

On May 31, 2017, the Nuclear Regulatory Commission announced that it had authorized the issuance of a Combined License for North Anna Nuclear Generating Station unit 3.

== See also ==
- Nuclear power
- Nuclear safety in the United States
- Economics of nuclear power plants
- Generation III reactor
- European Pressurized Reactor
- Nuclear Power 2010 Program

=== Other Generation III+ designs ===
- EPR
- US-APWR
- ACR
