= Fukushima Nuclear Power Plant =

Fukushima Nuclear Power Plant can refer to:

- Fukushima Daiichi Nuclear Power Plant, Dai-ichi, 6 BWR units, operational from 1971, 4 damaged irrecoverably in March 2011.
- Fukushima Daini Nuclear Power Plant, Daini, 4 BWR units, operational from 1982, slightly damaged in March 2011.
