= ESWS =

ESWS may refer to:

- ESWS (band), an American rock band from Honolulu, Hawaii
- Enlisted Surface Warfare Specialist, a military badge of the United States Navy
- The Essential Service Water System in a nuclear power plant
