= Decay heat =

Heat generated from radioactive decay

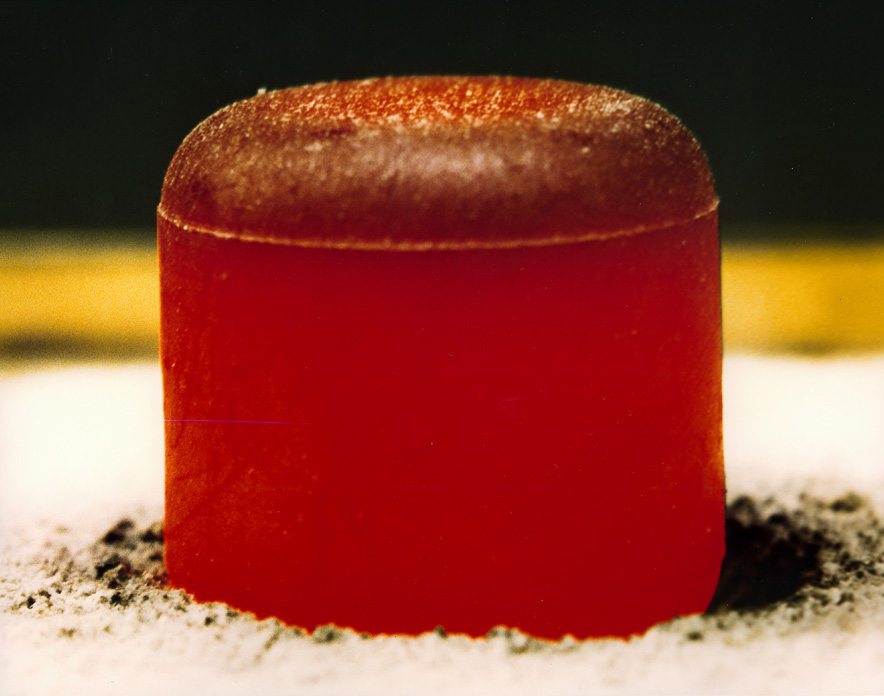
RTG pellet glowing red due to the heat generated by the radioactive decay of plutonium-238 dioxide, after a thermal isolation test.

Decay heat is the heat released as a result of radioactive decay. This heat is produced as an effect of radiation on materials: the energy of the alpha, beta or gamma radiation is converted into the thermal movement of atoms.

Decay heat occurs naturally from decay of long-lived radioisotopes that are primordially present from the Earth's formation.

In nuclear reactor engineering, decay heat continues to be generated after the reactor has been shut down (see SCRAM and nuclear chain reactions) and power generation has been suspended. The decay of the short-lived radioisotopes such as iodine-131 created in fission continues at high power for a time after shut down. The major source of heat production in a newly shut down reactor is due to the beta decay of new radioactive elements recently produced from fission fragments in the fission process.

Quantitatively, at the moment of reactor shutdown, decay heat from these radioactive sources is still 6.5% of the previous core power if the reactor has had a long and steady power history. About 1 hour after shutdown, the decay heat will be about 1.5% of the previous core power. After a day, the decay heat falls to 0.4%, and after a week, it will be only 0.2%. Because radioisotopes of all half-life lengths are present in nuclear waste, enough decay heat continues to be produced in spent fuel rods to require them to spend a minimum of one year, and more typically 10 to 20 years, in a spent fuel pool of water before being further processed. However, the heat produced during this time is still only a small fraction (less than 10%) of the heat produced in the first week after shutdown.

If no cooling system is working to remove the decay heat from a crippled and newly shut down reactor, the decay heat may cause the core of the reactor to reach unsafe temperatures within a few hours or days, depending upon the type of core. These extreme temperatures can lead to minor fuel damage (e.g., a few fuel particle failures (0.1 to 0.5%) in a graphite-moderated, gas-cooled design) or even major core structural damage (meltdown) in a light water reactor or liquid metal fast reactor. Chemical species released from the damaged core material may lead to further explosive reactions (steam or hydrogen) which may further damage the reactor.

== Natural occurrence ==
Naturally occurring decay heat is a significant input to Earth's internal heat budget. Radioactive isotopes of uranium, thorium and potassium are the primary contributors to this decay heat, and this radioactive decay is the primary source of heat from which geothermal energy derives.

Decay heat has significant importance in astrophysical phenomena. For example, the light curves of Type Ia supernovae are widely thought to be powered by the heating provided by radioactive products from the decay of nickel and cobalt into iron (Type Ia light curve).

== Power reactors in shutdown ==
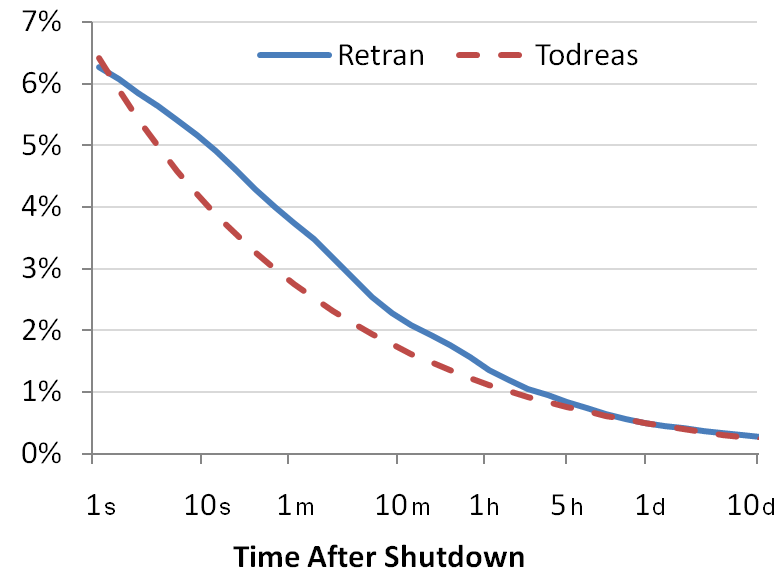
Decay heat as fraction of full power for a reactor SCRAMed from full power at time 0, using two different correlations

In a typical nuclear fission reaction, 187 MeV of energy are released instantaneously in the form of kinetic energy from the fission products, kinetic energy from the fission neutrons, instantaneous gamma rays, or gamma rays from the capture of neutrons. An additional 23 MeV of energy are released at some time after fission from the beta decay of fission products. About 10 MeV of the energy released from the beta decay of fission products is in the form of neutrinos, and since neutrinos are very weakly interacting, this 10 MeV of energy will not be deposited in the reactor core. This results in 13 MeV (6.5% of the total fission energy) being deposited in the reactor core from delayed beta decay of fission products, at some time after any given fission reaction has occurred. In a steady state, this heat from delayed fission product beta decay contributes 6.5% of the normal reactor heat output.

When a nuclear reactor has been shut down, and nuclear fission is not occurring at a large scale, the major source of heat production will be due to the delayed beta decay of these fission products (which originated as fission fragments). For this reason, at the moment of reactor shutdown, decay heat will be about 6.5% of the previous core power if the reactor has had a long and steady power history. About 1 hour after shutdown, the decay heat will be about 1.5% of the previous core power. After a day, the decay heat falls to 0.4%, and after a week it will be only 0.2%. The decay heat production rate will continue to slowly decrease over time; the decay curve depends upon the proportions of the various fission products in the core and upon their respective half-lives.

An approximation for the decay heat curve valid from 10 seconds to 100 days after shutdown is

$$\frac{P(\tau)}{P_0} = 0.066 \left( \left( \tau - \tau_s \right)^{-0.2} - \tau^{-0.2} \right),$$

where $\tau$ is the time since reactor startup, $P(\tau)$ is the power at time $\tau$, $P_0$ is the reactor power before shutdown, and $\tau_s$ is the time of reactor shutdown measured from the time of startup (in seconds), so that $t=(\tau - \tau_s)$ is the elapsed time since shutdown. This equation can be rewritten in terms of $t$ as
$$\frac{P(t)}{P_0} = 0.066 \left(  t^{-0.2} - (t_s+\tau_s)^{-0.2} \right),$$
which is known as Way–Wigner formula first formulated by Katharine Way and Eugene Wigner in 1948.

For an approach with a more direct physical basis, some models use the fundamental concept of radioactive decay. Used nuclear fuel contains a large number of different isotopes that contribute to decay heat, which are all subject to the radioactive decay law, so some models consider decay heat to be a sum of exponential functions with different decay constants and initial contribution to the heat rate. A more accurate model would consider the effects of precursors, since many isotopes follow several steps in their radioactive decay chain, and the decay of daughter products will have a greater effect longer after shutdown.

$$\frac{P}{P_0} = \sum_{i=1}^{11}P_i e^{-\lambda t}.$$

The removal of the decay heat is a significant reactor safety concern, especially shortly after normal shutdown or following a loss-of-coolant accident. Failure to remove decay heat may cause the reactor core temperature to rise to dangerous levels and has caused nuclear accidents, including the nuclear accidents at Three Mile Island and Fukushima I. The heat removal is usually achieved through several redundant and diverse systems, from which heat is removed via heat exchangers. Water is passed through the secondary side of the heat exchanger via the essential service water system which dissipates the heat into the 'ultimate heat sink', often a sea, river or large lake. In locations without a suitable body of water, the heat is dissipated into the air by recirculating the water via a cooling tower. The failure of ESWS circulating pumps was one of the factors that endangered safety during the 1999 Blayais Nuclear Power Plant flood.

== Spent fuel ==
After one year, typical spent nuclear fuel generates about 10 kW of decay heat per tonne, decreasing to about 1 kW/t after ten years. Hence effective active or passive cooling for spent nuclear fuel is required for a number of years.

== See also ==
- Decay energy
- Spent fuel pool
- Dry cask storage
- Radioisotope thermoelectric generator
