= Nuclear reactor heat removal =

The removal of heat from nuclear reactors is an essential step in the generation of energy from nuclear reactions. In nuclear engineering there are a number of empirical or semi-empirical relations used for quantifying the process of removing heat from a nuclear reactor core so that the reactor operates in the projected temperature interval that depends on the materials used in the construction of the reactor. The effectiveness of removal of heat from the reactor core depends on many factors, including the cooling agents used and the type of reactor. Common liquid coolants for nuclear reactors include: deionized water (with boric acid as a chemical shim during early burnup), heavy water, the lighter alkaline metals (such as sodium and lithium), lead or lead-based eutectic alloys like lead-bismuth, and NaK, a eutectic alloy of sodium and potassium. Gas cooled reactors operate with coolants like carbon dioxide, helium or nitrogen but some very low powered research reactors have even been air-cooled with Chicago Pile 1 relying on natural convection of the surrounding air to remove the negligible thermal power output. There is ongoing research into using supercritical fluids as reactor coolants but thus far neither the supercritical water reactor nor a reactor cooled with supercritical Carbon Dioxide nor any other kind of supercritical-fluid-cooled reactor has ever been built.

== Theoretical framework ==
The thermal energy produced in nuclear fuel comes mainly from the kinetic energy of fission fragments. Therefore, the heat generated per volume unit is proportional to the fraction of nuclear fissionable fuel burned in the unit of time:

$Q=a\phi\Nu_0\sigma_f$

where $N_0$ represents the number of atoms in a cubic meter of fuel, a is the amount of energy released in the fuel in each fission reaction (~181 MeV), $\phi$ is the neutronic flux, and $\sigma_f$ is the effective section of the fission.

The total heat produced in the nuclear reactor is:

$Q=a\overline{\phi}\Nu_0\sigma_fV$

where $\overline{\phi}$ is the mean neutronic flux and V is the fuel volume (normally measured in $m^3$).

Recovery of this amount of heat is achieved by using cooling fluids whose temperature at the entrance to the reactor channel $T_{f_0}$ will increase with the distance traveled in the channel. The thermal balance of the channel is expressed by the relationship:

$Gc_pdT_f=q(z)n\pi r_0^2dz$

where $G$ is the flow rate of the cooling agent, $c_p$ is the specific heat at constant pressure, $dT_f$ is the increase in the temperature of the fluid after passing a distance $dz$ in the channel, $q(z)$ is the heat generated per unit volume of the fuel, $r_0$ is the fuel cell radius and $n$ is the number of channel bars.

Under these conditions, the temperature of the cooling agent at distance z travelled into the cooling channel inside nuclear reactor is obtained by integrating the previous equation:

$T_f(z)=T_{f_0}+n(\pi r_0^2)(Gc_p)^{-1} \textstyle \int\limits_{0}^{z} \displaystyle q(z)dz$

The difference between the temperature of the outer surface of the tube-channel $T$ and the temperature of the fluid is obtained from the relationship:

$\varphi=h(T_s-T_f)$

where $\varphi$ is the local heat flow on the casing - cooler contact surface unit and $h$ is the heat transfer agent casing-cooling agent.

The heat discharge from the PWR and PHWR reactors is made by pressurized water under forced convection. The general expression for determining the transfer coefficient is given by the Dittus - Boelter equation:

$\aleph u=aRe^{0.8}Pr^{0.4}$

where $\aleph u$ is Nusselt's number ( $\aleph u=\tfrac{hd_n}{\lambda}$, $h$ is the heat transfer coefficient, $d_n$ is the equivalent diameter, $\lambda$ is the thermal conductivity of the fluid); $a$ is a constant ($a$=0.023); $Re$ is the number of Reynolds ( $Re=V\tfrac{d_n}{\mu/\rho}$) $V$ is the average velocity of the fluid in the section considered, $\rho$ is the density of the fluid and $\mu$ is its dynamic viscosity); $Pr$ is the number of Prandtl ($Pr=\tfrac{\mu c_p}{\lambda}$).

If the flow of the fluid is made under conditions of a great difference between its temperature and the contact surface, the transfer coefficient is determined from the relationship:

$\tfrac{hd_n}{\lambda}=0.023 Re^{0.8}Pr^{1/3}(\mu/\mu_s)^{0.14}$

where $\mu_s$ is the dynamic viscosity of the coolant at the temperature of the adhering fluid film at the surface of the casing. The relation presented above is valid in the case of a long channel with $L/d_n>60$, where $L$ is the length of the channel.

The transfer coefficient for cooling the pipes by natural convection is obtained from:

$\aleph u=0.5(Gr\cdot Pr)^{0.25}(\tfrac{\mu}{\mu_s})^{0.25}$

where $Gr$ is the Grashof number given by the expression:

$Gr=\beta\Delta T\tfrac{gd_n^3\rho^2}{\mu^2}$

We use the notation $\beta$ for the volume expansion coefficient of the fluid, $g$ is the gravitational acceleration and $\Delta T$ is the difference between the average wall temperatures of the casing and the cooling agent.

In boiling water cooled reactors (BWR) and partly in pressure water cooled reactors (PWR and PHWR) the heat transfer is made with a vapor phase in the cooling medium, which is why this type of heat transfer is called heat transfer in a biphasic system. This allows obtaining much higher transfer coefficients than the one-phase heat transfer described in the Dittus-Boelter equation.

Coolant flow

Increasing the flow of heat, reducing the agent flow and lowering the pressure can lead to increased temperature of the cooled surface. If the temperature of the fluid in the channel section that we consider is lower than the boiling temperature under local pressure conditions, the vaporization is limited to the immediate vicinity of the surface and in this case the boiling is called submerged boiling. There is no proportionality between the heat flow and the difference between the surface temperature and the coolant temperature that allows the definition of a heat transfer coefficient similar to the one-phase case. In this situation we can use the equation of Jens and Lottes, which establishes a connection between the difference $\Delta T_s$ between the surface temperature and the boiling temperature of the cooling agent under local pressure conditions $P$ below the thermal flux $\varphi$:

$\Delta T_s=a\varphi^{1/4}exp(-P/P_0)$

where $a=7.9^\circ C cm^{0.5}W^{-0.25}$ and $P_0=6.43 MPa$

If the temperature of the fluid in the channel section considered is slightly higher than the boiling temperature under local pressure conditions, the heat transfer is by boiling with nucleation, forming vapor bubbles trained by the cooling agent (that becomes biphasic throughout its entire volume). However, the vapor content is relatively small and the continuous phase remains the liquid phase. The vapor content of the PHW-CANDU reactor is about 0.03-0.04 kg steam / kg of agent, thus increasing the amount of heat transported by the unit mass of agent by over 10%. If the cooled surface temperature far exceeds the boiling temperature of the cooling agent in the channel section, the vapor content of the agent increases considerably, the continuous phase becoming the vapor phase and the liquid phase becoming only a suspension between vapors. The cooled surface remains covered with a liquid film which still provides a very high heat transfer coefficient, $\thicksim6\cdot10^4 W/m^2\cdot K$ at BWR compared to $\thicksim3\cdot10^4 W/m^2\cdot K$ at PWR. The film of liquid is continuously fed with drops from the agent suspension.

A further increase in surface temperature leads to a temporary interruption of continuity of the liquid film adhering to the cooled surface. Watering of the surface continues, however, by the drops of liquid in the suspension that are present in the cooling agent as long as the heat flow remains below a value that depends on local conditions (value that is called critical flux). Over this flux there is a thermal transfer crisis characterized by a sudden decrease in the transfer coefficient due to the presence of only one-phase transfer. The heat transfer coefficient in the pre-crisis period can be determined from the relationship:

$\tfrac{\aleph u}{Re^{0.8}Pr^{0.4}}=k_1B_0+k_2(1/\chi)^n$

where $\chi=((\Delta p)_l/\Delta p_g)_g)^{1/2}$

In these formulas the following notations were made: $dp$ is pressure losses for the two phases (water and vapors), $B_0=\varphi/d_n H_{gl}$ ( $\varphi$ - the thermal flux, $H_{gl}$- the enthalpy of the biphasic liquid-gaseous mixture). The heat transfer coefficient during the crisis is related to the critical heat flow $\varphi_{cr}(W/m^2)$ through a linear relationship, of the equation type $\varphi=h(T_s-T_f)$ that was presented before:

$\varphi_{cr}=h_{cr}(T_s-T_{st})$

Where $T_s$ is the temperature of the surface in thermal transfer crisis, and $T_{st}$ is the temperature of the vapor at saturation.

The critical flow is obtained by using the Kutateladze's formula:

$\rho_{cr}=0.14r\rho_v^{1/2}[g\sigma(\rho_l-\rho_v)]^{1/4}$

where $r$ (J/kg)is the latent heat of vaporization, $\rho_l$ and $\rho_v$ are density of the liquid and saturation vapor, $\sigma$ is the superficial tension in N / m and $g$ is the gravitational acceleration. The heat transfer to the gas-cooled reactors is carried out by forced convection. For a gaseous thermal agent, the heat transfer coefficient can be deduced from a relation of the type Dittus-Boelter, but taking into account, for the intervening sizes, the values corresponding to the average temperature of the fluid film denoted by the index $m$:

$\aleph u_m=0.0205Re_m^{0.8}Pr_m^{0.4}$

which differs in the use of water by a slightly lower value of the coefficient a.

Forced flow relationships established for fluids are also not valid for liquid metals. The coefficient of heat transfer for circular pipelines with constant heat flux, where the heat evacuation is achieved by the turbulent flow of the molten metals, can be estimated with a relation of the type:

$\aleph u=0.625Pe^{0.4}$

where $Pe$ is the number of Peclet ($Pe=Vd_n\rho c_p/\lambda$).

== Examples of heat evacuation hydrodynamic parameters ==
For exemplification of the above formulas the hydrodynamic parameters of some types of reactors can be found in the following table:

Reactor	Cooling agent	Pressure [Mpa]	Speed of the fluid [m/s]	Re	Pr
G1	$\ce{Acr}$	0.1	20	26,000	0.73
EL-4	$\ce{CO2}$	5.9	50	820,000	0.7
MTR	$\ce{H2O}$	0.1	1	9,000	4.57
VVER-440	$\ce{H2O}$	12.5	3.7	330,000	0.90
FBR	$\ce{Na}$	-	5	93,000	0.36

G1 and EL-4 are reactors that were built in France, while VVER-440 is a reactor that has been constructed in the Soviet Union.
