= Behavior of nuclear fuel during a reactor accident =

Nuclear fuel behavior in a meltdown

This page describes how uranium dioxide nuclear fuel behaves during both normal nuclear reactor operation and under reactor accident conditions, such as overheating. Work in this area is often very expensive to conduct, and so has often been performed on a collaborative basis between groups of countries, usually under the aegis of the Organisation for Economic Co-operation and Development's Committee on the Safety of Nuclear Installations (CSNI).

This is a false colour tomography picture of a bundle (FPT1) of 18 irradiated fuel rods (23 GWd/tU mean burn-up) degraded under steam as part of the PHEBUS set of experiments. The black and blue is for areas of low density while red is an area of high density. It can be seen that the fuel has failed mechanically and has formed a pool near the bottom of the bundle. The bottom of the bundle did not melt.

== Swelling ==
=== Cladding ===
Both the fuel and cladding can swell. Cladding covers the fuel to form a fuel pin and can be deformed. It is normal to fill the gap between the fuel and the cladding with helium gas to permit better thermal contact between the fuel and the cladding. During use the amount of gas inside the fuel pin can increase because of the formation of noble gases (krypton and xenon) by the fission process. If a Loss-of-coolant accident (LOCA) (e.g. Three Mile Island) or a Reactivity Initiated Accident (RIA) (e.g. Chernobyl or SL-1) occurs then the temperature of this gas can increase. As the fuel pin is sealed the pressure of the gas will increase (PV = nRT) and it is possible to deform and burst the cladding. It has been noticed that both corrosion and irradiation can alter the properties of the zirconium alloy commonly used as cladding, making it brittle. As a result, the experiments using unirradiated zirconium alloy tubes can be misleading.

According to one paper the following difference between the cladding failure mode of unused and used fuel was seen.

Unirradiated fuel rods were pressurized before being placed in a special reactor at the Japanese Nuclear Safety Research Reactor (NSRR) where they were subjected to a simulated RIA transient. These rods failed after ballooning late in the transient when the cladding temperature was high. The failure of the cladding in these tests was ductile, and it was a burst opening.

The used fuel (61 GW days/tonne of uranium) failed early in the transient with a brittle fracture which was a longitudinal crack.

It was found that hydrided zirconium tube is weaker and the bursting pressure is lower.

The common failure process of fuel in the water-cooled reactors is a transition to film boiling and subsequent ignition of zirconium cladding in the steam. The effects of the intense hot hydrogen reaction product flow on the fuel pellets and on the bundle's wall well represented on the sidebar picture.

=== Fuel ===
The nuclear fuel can swell during use, this is because of effects such as fission gas formation in the fuel and the damage which occurs to the lattice of the solid. The fission gases accumulate in the void that forms in the center of a fuel pellet as burnup increases. As the void forms, the once-cylindrical pellet degrades into pieces. The swelling of the fuel pellet can cause pellet-cladding interaction when it thermally expands to the inside of the cladding tubing. The swollen fuel pellet imposes mechanical stresses upon the cladding. A document on the subject of the swelling of the fuel can be downloaded from the NASA web site.

== Fission gas release ==
As the fuel is degraded or heated the more volatile fission products which are trapped within the uranium dioxide may become free. For example, see Colle et al..

A report on the release of ^{85}Kr, ^{106}Ru and ^{137}Cs from uranium when air is present has been written. It was found that uranium dioxide was converted to U_{3}O_{8} between about 300 and 500 °C in air. They report that this process requires some time to start, after the induction time the sample gains mass. The authors report that a layer of U_{3}O_{7} was present on the uranium dioxide surface during this induction time. They report that 3 to 8% of the krypton-85 was released, and that much less of the ruthenium (0.5%) and caesium (2.6 × 10^{−3}%) occurred during the oxidation of the uranium dioxide.

== Heat transfer between the cladding and the water ==
In a water-cooled power reactor (or in a water-filled spent fuel pool, SFP), if a power surge occurs as a result of a reactivity initiated accident, an understanding of the transfer of heat from the surface of the cladding to the water is very useful. In a French study, metal pipe immersed in water (both under typical PWR and SFP conditions), was electrically heated to simulate the generation of heat within a fuel pin by nuclear processes. The temperature of the pipe was monitored by thermocouples and for the tests conducted under PWR conditions the water entering the larger pipe (14.2 mm diameter) holding the test metal pipe (9.5 mm outside diameter and 600 mm long) was at 280 °C and 15 MPa. The water was flowing past the inner pipe at circa 4 ms^{−1} and the cladding was subjected to heating at 2200 to 4900 °C s^{−1} to simulate an RIA. It was found that as the temperature of the cladding increased the rate of heat transfer from the surface of the cladding increased at first as the water boiled at nucleation sites. When the heat flux is greater than the critical heat flux a boiling crisis occurs. This occurs as the temperature of the fuel cladding surface increases so that the surface of the metal was too hot (surface dries out) for nucleation boiling. When the surface dries out the rate of heat transfer decreases, after a further increase in the temperature of the metal surface the boiling resumes but it is now film boiling.

== Hydriding and waterside corrosion ==
As a nuclear fuel bundle increases in burnup (time in reactor), the radiation begins changing not only the fuel pellets inside the cladding, but the cladding material itself. The zirconium chemically reacts to the water flowing around it as coolant, forming a protective oxide on the surface of the cladding. Typically a fifth of the cladding wall will be consumed by oxide in PWRs. There is a smaller corrosion layer thickness in BWRs. The chemical reaction that takes place is:

Zr + 2 H_{2}O → ZrO_{2} + 2 H_{2} (g)

Hydriding occurs when the product gas (hydrogen) precipitates out as hydrides within the zirconium. This causes the cladding to become embrittled, instead of ductile. The hydride bands form in rings within the cladding. As the cladding experiences hoop stress from the growing amount of fission products, the hoop stress increases. The material limitations of the cladding is one aspect that limits the amount of burnup nuclear fuel can accumulate in a reactor.

While fuel elements are typically resistant to corrosion, other reactor elements are generally not as corrosion resistant. Precipitated corrosion particles eventually accumulate as a layer of fouling on fuel elements, known as crud.

When a nuclear fuel assembly is prepared for onsite storage, it is dried and moved to a spent nuclear fuel shipping cask with scores of other assemblies. Then it sits on a concrete pad for a number of years waiting for an intermediate storage facility or reprocessing. The transportation of radiation-damaged cladding is tricky, because it is so fragile. After being removed from the reactor and cooling down in the spent fuel pool, the hydrides within the cladding of an assembly reorient themselves so that they radially point out from the fuel, rather than circularly in the direction of the hoop stress. This puts the fuel in a situation so that when it is moved to its final resting place, if the cask were to fall, the cladding would be so weak it could break and release the spent fuel pellets inside the cask.

=== Corrosion on the inside of the cladding ===
Zirconium alloys can undergo stress corrosion cracking when exposed to iodine; the iodine is formed as a fission product which depending on the nature of the fuel can escape from the pellet. It has been shown that iodine causes the rate of cracking in pressurised zircaloy-4 tubing to increase.

=== Graphite moderated reactors ===
In the cases of carbon dioxide cooled graphite moderated reactors such as magnox and AGR power reactors an important corrosion reaction is the reaction of a molecule of carbon dioxide with graphite (carbon) to form two molecules of carbon monoxide. This is one of the processes which limits the working life of this type of reactor.

=== Water-cooled reactors ===
==== Corrosion ====
In a water-cooled reactor the action of radiation on the water (radiolysis) forms hydrogen peroxide and oxygen. These can cause stress corrosion cracking of metal parts which include fuel cladding and other pipework. To mitigate this hydrazine and hydrogen are injected into a BWR or PWR primary cooling circuit as corrosion inhibitors to adjust the redox properties of the system. A review of recent developments on this topic has been published.

==== Thermal stresses upon quenching ====
In a loss-of-coolant accident (LOCA) it is thought that the surface of the cladding could reach a temperature between 800 and 1400 K, and the cladding will be exposed to steam for some time before water is reintroduced into the reactor to cool the fuel. During this time when the hot cladding is exposed to steam some oxidation of the zirconium will occur to form a zirconium oxide which is more zirconium rich than zirconia. This Zr(O) phase is the α-phase, further oxidation forms zirconia. The longer the cladding is exposed to steam the less ductile it will be. One measure of the ductility is to compress a ring along a diameter (at a constant rate of displacement, in this case 2 mm min^{−1}) until the first crack occurs, then the ring will start to fail. The elongation which occurs between when the maximum force is applied and when the mechanical load is declined to 80% of the load required to induce the first crack is the L_{0.8} value in mm. The more ductile a sample is the greater this L_{0.8} value will be.

In one experiment the zirconium is heated in steam to 1473 K, the sample is slowly cooled in steam to 1173 K before being quenched in water. As the heating time at 1473 K is increased the zirconium becomes more brittle and the L_{0.8} value declines.

=== Aging of steels ===
Irradiation causes the properties of steels to become poorer, for instance SS316 becomes less ductile and less tough. Also creep and stress corrosion cracking become worse. Papers on this effect continue to be published.

== Cracking and overheating of the fuel ==
This is due to the fact that as the fuel expands on heating, the core of the pellet expands more than the rim. Because of the thermal stress thus formed the fuel cracks, the cracks tend to go from the center to the edge in a star shaped pattern. A PhD thesis on the subject has been published by a student at the Royal Institute of Technology in Stockholm (Sweden).

The cracking of the fuel has an effect on the release of radioactivity from fuel both under accident conditions and also when the spent fuel is used as the final disposal form. The cracking increases the surface area of the fuel which increases the rate at which fission products can leave the fuel.

The temperature of the fuel varies as a function of the distance from the center to the rim. At distance x from the center the temperature (T_{x}) is described by the equation where ρ is the power density (W m^{−3}) and K_{f} is the thermal conductivity.

T_{x} = T_{Rim} + ρ (r_{pellet}² – x²) (4 K_{f})^{−1}

To explain this for a series of fuel pellets being used with a rim temperature of 200 °C (typical for a BWR) with different diameters and power densities of 250 Wm^{−3} have been modeled using the above equation. These fuel pellets are rather large; it is normal to use oxide pellets which are about 10 mm in diameter.

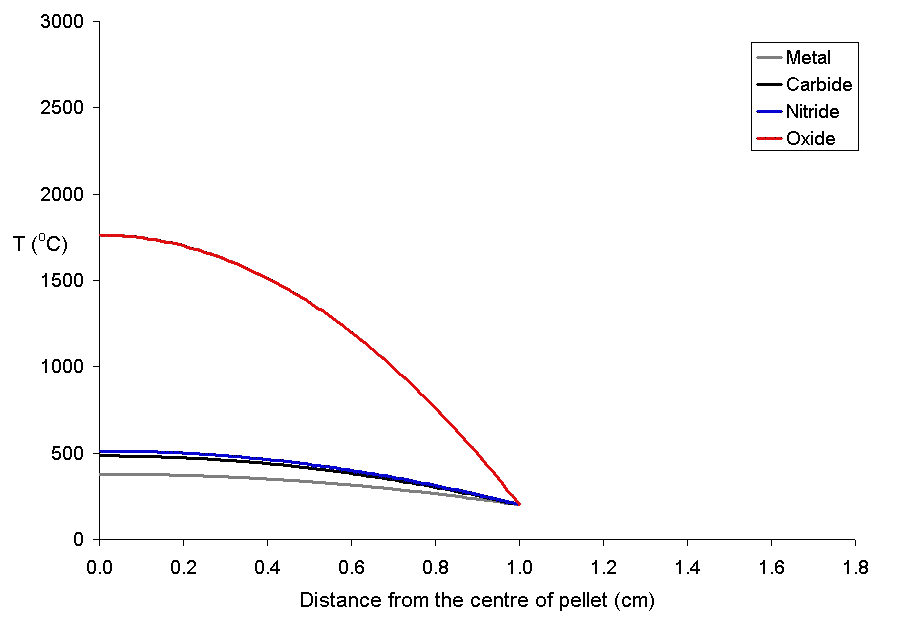
Temperature profile for a 20 mm diameter fuel pellet with a power density of 250 W per cubic meter. The central temperature is very different for the different fuel solids.

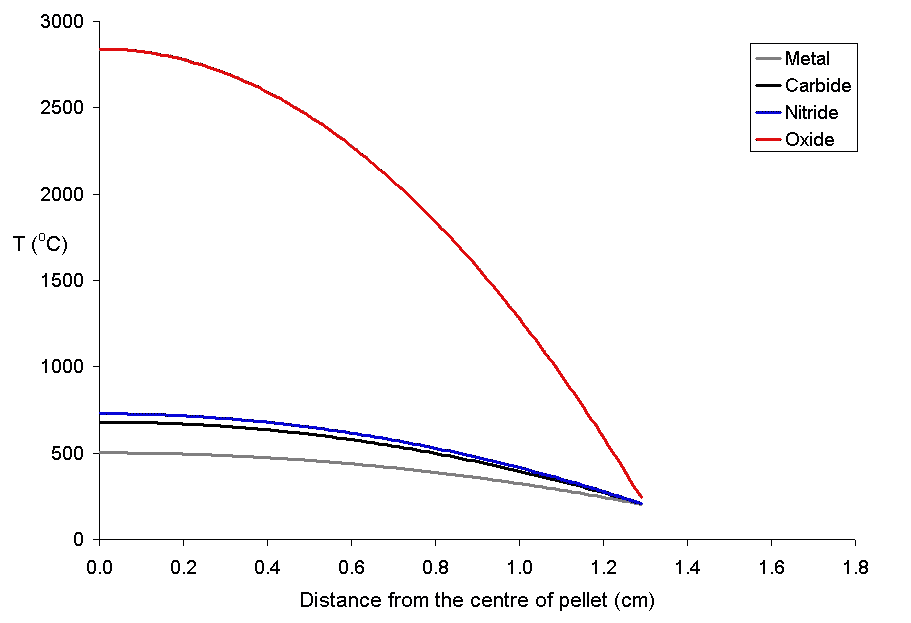
Temperature profile for a 26 mm diameter fuel pellet with a power density of 250 W per cubic meter.

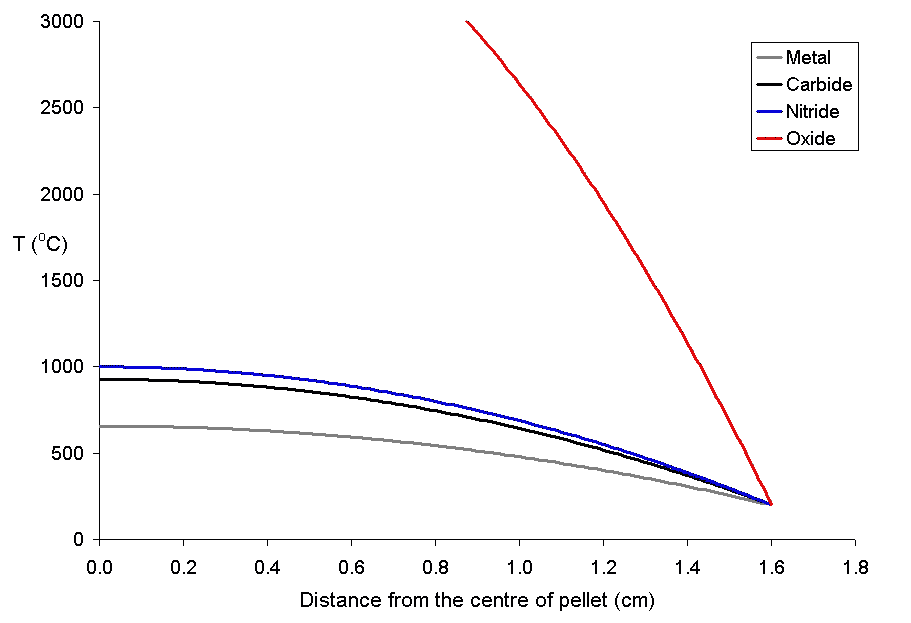
Temperature profile for a 32 mm diameter fuel pellet with a power density of 250 W per cubic meter.

To show the effects of different power densities on the centerline temperatures two graphs for 20 mm pellets at different power levels are shown below. It is clear that for all pellets (and most true of uranium dioxide) that for a given sized pellet that a limit must be set on the power density. It is likely that the maths used for these calculations would be used to explain how electrical fuses function and also it could be used to predict the centerline temperature in any system where heat is released throughout a cylinder shaped object.

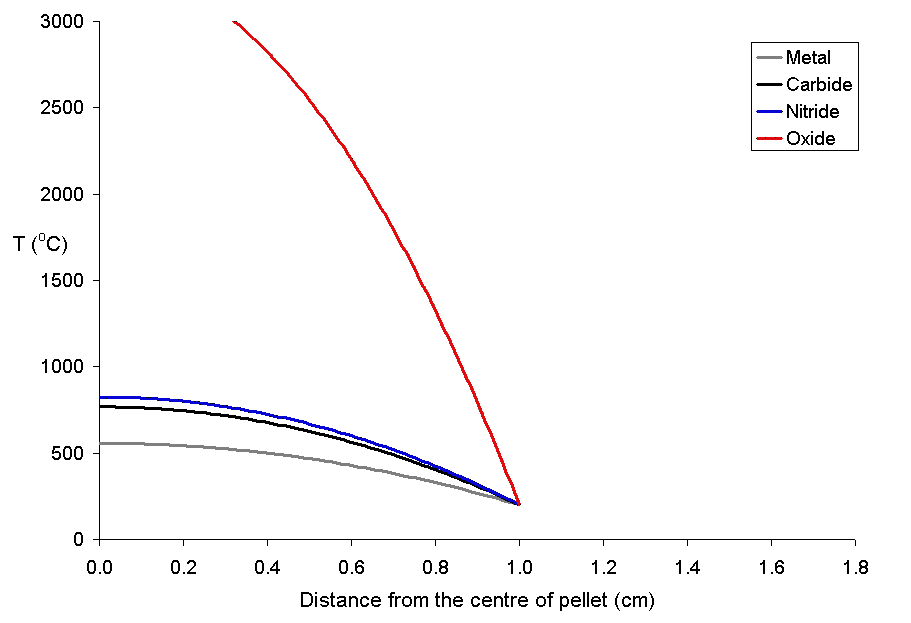
Temperature profile for a 20 mm diameter fuel pellet with a power density of 500 W per cubic meter. Because the melting point of uranium dioxide is about 3300 K, it is clear that uranium oxide fuel is overheating at the center.

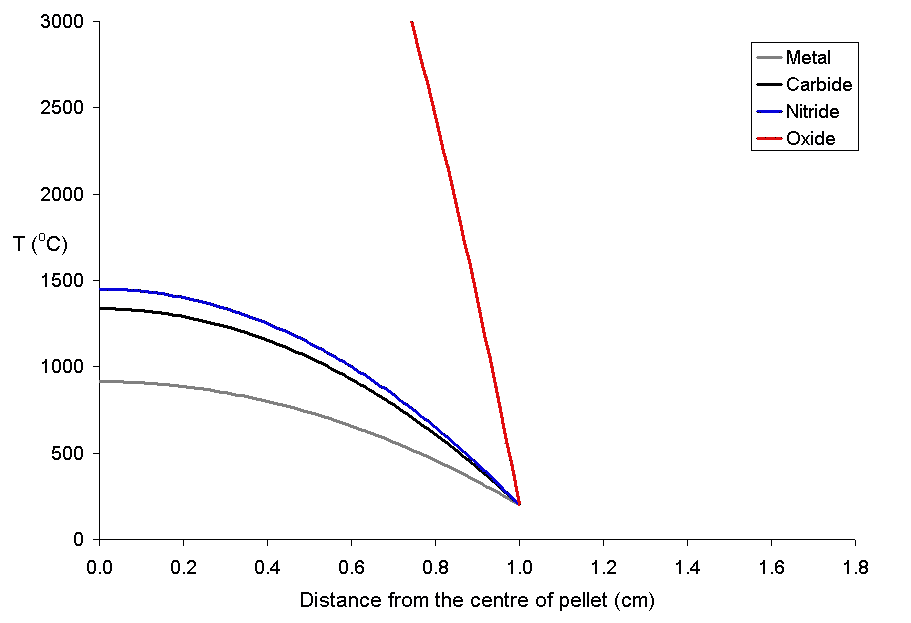
Temperature profile for a 20 mm diameter fuel pellet with a power density of 1000 W per cubic meter. The fuels other than uranium dioxide are not compromised.

=== Loss of volatile fission products from pellets ===
The heating of pellets can result in some of the fission products being lost from the core of the pellet. If the xenon can rapidly leave the pellet then the amount of ^{134}Cs and ^{137}Cs which is present in the gap between the cladding and the fuel will increase. As a result, if the zircaloy tubes holding the pellet are broken then a greater release of radioactive caesium from the fuel will occur. The ^{134}Cs and ^{137}Cs are formed in different ways, and hence as a result the two caesium isotopes can be found at different parts of a fuel pin.

It is clear that the volatile iodine and xenon isotopes have minutes in which they can diffuse out of the pellet and into the gap between the fuel and the cladding. Here the xenon can decay to the long lived caesium isotope.

==== Genesis of ^{137}Cs ====
Formation of ^{137}Cs from its precursors
| Element | Isotope | decay mode | half-life | direct fission yield |
|---|---|---|---|---|
| Sn | 137 | β | very short (<1 s) | 0.00% |
| Sb | 137 | β | very short (<1 s) | 0.03% |
| Te | 137 | β | 2.5 seconds | 0.19% |
| I | 137 | β | 24.5 seconds | 1.40% |
| Xe | 137 | β | 3.8 minutes | 1.44% |
| Cs | 137 | β | 30 years | 0.08% |

These fission yields were calculated for ^{235}U assuming thermal neutrons (0.0253 eV) using data from the chart of the nuclides.

==== Genesis of ^{134}Cs ====
In the case of ^{134}Cs the precursor to this isotope is stable ^{133}Cs which is formed by the decay of much longer lived xenon and iodine isotopes. No ^{134}Cs is formed without neutron activation as ^{134}Xe is a stable isotope. As a result of this different mode of formation the physical location of ^{134}Cs can differ from that of ^{137}Cs.

Formation of ^{134}Cs and its decay products (daughters)
| Element | Isotope | decay mode | half-life | direct fission yield |
|---|---|---|---|---|
| In | 133 | β | 0.18 seconds | 0.00% |
| Sn | 133 | β | 1.45 seconds | 0.07% |
| Sb | 133 | β | 2.5 minutes | 1.11% |
| Te | 133m | β (82.5%) | 55.4 minutes | 0.49% |
| Te | 133 | β | 12.5 minutes | 0.15% |
| I | 133 | β | 20.8 hours | 1.22% |
| Xe | 133 | β | 5.2 days | 0.00% |
| Cs | 133 | – | stable (undergoes neutron activation in the core) | 0.00% |
| Cs | 134 | β | 2.1 years | 6.4 × 10^{−6}% |

These fission yields were calculated for ^{235}U assuming thermal neutrons (0.0253 eV) using data from the chart of the nuclides.

=== An example of a recent PIE study ===
In a recent study, used 20% enriched uranium dispersed in a range of different matrices was examined to determine the physical locations of different isotopes and chemical elements.

- A solid solution of urania in yttria-stabilized zirconia (YSZ) (Y:Zr atom ratio of 1:4).
- Urania particles in an inert matrix formed by a mixture of YSZ and spinel (MgAl_{2}O_{4}).
- Urania particles dispersed in the inert matrix formed by a mixture of YSZ and alumina.

The fuels varied in their ability to retain the fission xenon; the first of the three fuels retained 97% of the ^{133}Xe, the second retained 94% while the last fuel only retained 76% of this xenon isotope. The ^{133}Xe is a long-lived radioactive isotope which can diffuse slowly out of the pellet before being neutron activated to form ^{134}Cs. The more short-lived ^{137}Xe was less able to leach out of the pellets; 99%, 98% and 95% of the ^{137}Xe was retained within the pellets. It was also found that the ^{137}Cs concentration in the core of the pellet was much lower than the concentration in the rim of the pellet, while the less volatile ^{106}Ru was spread more evenly throughout the pellets.

The following fuel is particles of solid solution of urania in yttria-stabilized zirconia dispersed in alumina which had burnt up to 105 GW-days per cubic meter. The scanning electron microscope (SEM) is of the interface between the alumina and a fuel particle. It can be seen that the fission products are well confined to within the fuel, little of the fission products have entered the alumina matrix. The neodymium is spread throughout the fuel in a uniform manner, while the caesium is almost homogenously spread out throughout the fuel. The caesium concentration is slightly higher at two points where xenon bubbles are present. Much of the xenon is present in bubbles, while almost all of the ruthenium is present in the form of nanoparticles. The ruthenium nanoparticles are not always colocated with the xenon bubbles.

== Release of fission products into coolant water in a Three Mile Island type accident ==
At Three Mile Island a recently SCRAMed core was starved of cooling water, as a result of the decay heat the core dried out and the fuel was damaged. Attempts were made to recool the core using water. According to the International Atomic Energy Agency for a 3,000 MW (t) PWR the normal coolant radioactivity levels are shown below in the table, and the coolant activities for reactors which have been allowed to dry out (and over heat) before being recovered with water. In a gap release the activity in the fuel/cladding gap has been released while in the core melt release the core was melted before being recovered by water.

The levels of radioactivity in the coolant of a typical PWR under different conditions (MBq L^{−1})
| Isotope | Normal | >20% Gap release | >10% Core melt |
|---|---|---|---|
| ^{131}I | 2 | 200000 | 700000 |
| ^{134}Cs | 0.3 | 10000 | 60000 |
| ^{137}Cs | 0.3 | 6000 | 30000 |
| ^{140}Ba | 0.5 | – | 100000 |

== Chernobyl release ==
The release of radioactivity from the used fuel is greatly controlled by the volatility of the elements. At Chernobyl much of the xenon and iodine was released while much less of the zirconium was released. The fact that only the more volatile fission products are released with ease will greatly retard the release of radioactivity in the event of an accident which causes serious damage to the core. Using two sources of data it is possible to see that the elements which were in the form of gases, volatile compounds or semi-volatile compounds (such as CsI) were released at Chernobyl while the less volatile elements which form solid solutions with the fuel remained inside the reactor fuel.

According to the OECD NEA report on Chernobyl (ten years on), the following proportions of the core inventory were released. The physical and chemical forms of the release included gases, aerosols and finely fragmented solid fuel. According to some research the ruthenium is very mobile when the nuclear fuel is heated with air. This mobility has been more evident in reprocessing, with related releases of ruthenium, the most recent being the airborne radioactivity increase in Europe in autumn 2017, as with the ionizing radiation environment of spent fuel and the presence of oxygen, radiolysis-reactions can generate the volatile compound ruthenium(VIII) oxide, which has a boiling point of approximately 40 °C (104 °F) and is a strong oxidizer, reacting with virtually any fuel/hydrocarbon, that are used in PUREX.

Some work on TRISO fuel heated in air, with the respective encapsulation of nuclides, has been published.

=== Table of chemical data ===
Chemical forms of fission products in uranium dioxide, the percentage release at Chernobyl and the temperatures according to Colle et al. required to release 10% of an element from either unoxidized or oxidized fuel. When data from one element is assumed to apply to another element the energy is in Italics.
| Element | Gas | Metal | Oxide | Solid solution | Radioisotopes | Release at Chernobyl | T required for 10% release from UO_{2} | T required for 10% release from U_{3}O_{8} |
|---|---|---|---|---|---|---|---|---|
| Br | Yes | – | – | – | – | – | – | – |
| Kr | Yes | – | – | – | ^{85}Kr | 100% | – | – |
| Rb | Yes | – | Yes | – | – | – | – | – |
| Sr | – | – | Yes | Yes | ^{89}Sr and ^{90}Sr | 4–6% | 1950 K | – |
| Y | – | – | – | Yes | – | 3.5% | – | – |
| Zr | – | – | Yes | Yes | ^{93}Zr and ^{95}Zr | 3.5% | 2600 K | – |
| Nb | – | – | Yes | – | – | – | – | – |
| Mo | – | Yes | Yes | – | ^{99}Mo | >3.5% | – | 1200 K |
| Tc | – | Yes | – | – | ^{99}Tc | – | – | 1300 K |
| Ru | – | Yes | – | – | ^{103}Ru and ^{106}Ru | >3.5% | – | – |
| Rh | – | Yes | – | – | – | – | – | – |
| Pd | – | Yes | – | – | – | – | – | – |
| Ag | – | Yes | – | – | – | – | – | – |
| Cd | – | Yes | – | – | – | – | – | – |
| In | – | Yes | – | – | – | – | – | – |
| Sn | – | Yes | – | – | – | – | – | – |
| Sb | – | Yes | – | – | – | – | – | – |
| Te | Yes | Yes | Yes | Yes | ^{132}Te | 25–60% | 1400 K | 1200 K |
| I | Yes | – | – | – | ^{131}I | 50–60% | 1300 K | 1100 K |
| Xe | Yes | – | – | – | ^{133}Xe | 100% | 1450 K | – |
| Cs | Yes | – | Yes | – | ^{134}Cs and ^{137}Cs | 20–40% | 1300 K | 1200 to 1300 K |
| Ba | – | – | Yes | Yes | ^{140}Ba | 4–6% | 1850 K | 1300 K |
| La | – | – | – | Yes | – | 3.5% | 2300 K | – |
| Ce | – | – | – | Yes | ^{141}Ce and ^{144}Ce | 3.5% | 2300 K | – |
| Pr | – | – | – | Yes | – | 3.5% | 2300 K | – |
| Nd | – | – | – | Yes | – | 3.5% | 2300 K | – |
| Pm | – | – | – | Yes | – | 3.5% | 2300 K | – |
| Sm | – | – | – | Yes | – | 3.5% | 2300 K | – |
| Eu | – | – | – | Yes | – | 3.5% | 2300 K | – |

The releases of fission products and uranium from uranium dioxide (from spent BWR fuel, burnup was 65 GWd t^{−1}) which was heated in a Knudsen cell has been repeated. Fuel was heated in the Knudsen cell both with and without preoxidation in oxygen at c 650 K. It was found even for the noble gases that a high temperature was required to liberate them from the uranium oxide solid. For unoxidized fuel 2300 K was required to release 10% of the uranium while oxidized fuel only requires 1700 K to release 10% of the uranium.

According to the report on Chernobyl used in the above table 3.5% of the following isotopes in the core were released ^{239}Np, ^{238}Pu, ^{239}Pu, ^{240}Pu, ^{241}Pu and ^{242}Cm.

== Degradation of the whole fuel element ==
Water and zirconium can react violently at 1200 °C, at the same temperature the zircaloy cladding can react with uranium dioxide to form zirconium oxide and a uranium/zirconium alloy melt.

=== PHEBUS ===
In France a facility exists in which a fuel melting incident can be made to happen under strictly controlled conditions. In the PHEBUS research program fuels have been allowed to heat up to temperatures in excess of the normal operating temperatures, the fuel in question is in a special channel which is in a toroidal nuclear reactor. The nuclear reactor is used as a driver core to irradiate the test fuel. While the reactor is cooled as normal by its own cooling system the test fuel has its own cooling system, which is fitted with filters and equipment to study the release of radioactivity from the damaged fuel. Already the release of radioisotopes from fuel under different conditions has been studied. After the fuel has been used in the experiment it is subject to a detailed examination (PIE), In the 2004 annual report from the ITU some results of the PIE on PHEBUS (FPT2) fuel are reported in section 3.6.

=== LOFT ===
The Loss of Fluid Tests (LOFT) were an early attempt to scope the response of real nuclear fuel to conditions under a loss-of-coolant accident, funded by USNRC. The facility was built at Idaho National Laboratory, and was essentially a scale-model of a commercial PWR. ('Power/volume scaling' was used between the LOFT model, with a 50MWth core, and a commercial plant of 3000MWth).

The original intention (1963–1975) was to study only one or two major (large break) LOCA, since these had been the main concern of US 'rule-making' hearings in the late 1960s and early 1970s. These rules had focussed around a rather stylised large-break accident, and a set of criteria (e.g. for extent of fuel-clad oxidation) set out in 'Appendix K' of 10CFR50 (Code of Federal Regulations). Following the accident at Three Mile Island, detailed modelling of much smaller LOCA became of equal concern.

38 LOFT tests were eventually performed and their scope was broadened to study a wide spectrum of breach sizes. These tests were used to help validate a series of computer codes (such as RELAP-4, RELAP-5 and TRAC) then being developed to calculate the thermal-hydraulics of LOCA. The data was shared with other organizations through international partnerships and has been used to validate other codes such as the French code CATHARE or the South Korean code SPACE.

=== See also ===
- NUREG-1150
- Nuclear power

== Contact of molten fuel with water and concrete ==
=== Water ===
Extensive work was done from 1970 to 1990 on the possibility of a steam explosion or FCI when molten 'corium' contacted water. Many experiments suggested quite low conversion of thermal to mechanical energy, whereas the theoretical models available appeared to suggest that much higher efficiencies were possible. A NEA/OECD report was written on the subject in 2000 which states that a steam explosion caused by contact of corium with water has four stages.

- Premixing
  - As the jet of corium enters the water, it breaks up into droplets. During this stage the thermal contact between the corium and the water is not good because a vapor film surrounds the droplets of corium and this insulates the two from each other. It is possible for this meta-stable state to quench without an explosion or it can trigger in the next step
- Triggering
  - A externally or internally generated trigger (such as a pressure wave) causes a collapse of the vapor film between the corium and the water.
- Propagation
  - The local increase in pressure due to the increased heating of the water can generate enhanced heat transfer (usually due to rapid fragmentation of the hot fluid within the colder more volatile one) and a greater pressure wave, this process can be self-sustained. (The mechanics of this stage would then be similar to those in a classical ZND detonation wave).
- Expansion
  - This process leads to the whole of the water being suddenly heated to boiling. This causes an increase in pressure (in layman's terms, an explosion), which can result in damage to the plant.

==== Recent work ====
Work in Japan in 2003 melted uranium dioxide and zirconium dioxide in a crucible before being added to water. The fragmentation of the fuel which results is reported in the Journal of Nuclear Science and Technology.

=== Concrete ===
A review of the subject can be read at and work on the subject continues to this day; in Germany at the FZK some work has been done on the effect of thermite on concrete, this is a simulation of the effect of the molten core of a reactor breaking through the bottom of the pressure vessel into the containment building.

== Lava flows from corium ==
The corium (molten core) will cool and change to a solid with time. It is thought that the solid is weathering with time. The solid can be described as Fuel Containing Mass, it is a mixture of sand, zirconium and uranium dioxide which had been heated at a very high temperature until it has melted. The chemical nature of this FCM has been the subject of some research. The amount of fuel left in this form within the plant has been considered. A silicone polymer has been used to fix the contamination.

The Chernobyl melt was a silicate melt which did contain inclusions of Zr/U phases, molten steel and high uranium zirconium silicate. The lava flow consists of more than one type of material—a brown lava and a porous ceramic material have been found. The uranium to zirconium for different parts of the solid differs a lot, in the brown lava a uranium rich phase with a U:Zr ratio of 19:3 to about 38:10 is found. The uranium poor phase in the brown lava has a U:Zr ratio of about 1:10. It is possible from the examination of the Zr/U phases to know the thermal history of the mixture. It can be shown that before the explosion that in part of the core the temperature was higher than 2000 °C, while in some areas the temperature was over 2400–2600 °C.

The radioactivity levels of different isotopes in the FCM, this has been back calculated by Russian workers to April 1986, note that the levels of radioactivity have decayed a great deal by now

== Spent fuel corrosion ==
=== Uranium dioxide films ===
Uranium dioxide films can be deposited by reactive sputtering using an argon and oxygen mixture at a low pressure. This has been used to make a layer of the uranium oxide on a gold surface which was then studied with AC impedance spectroscopy.

=== Noble metal nanoparticles and hydrogen ===
According to the work of the corrosion electrochemist Shoesmith the nanoparticles of Mo-Tc-Ru-Pd have a strong effect on the corrosion of uranium dioxide fuel. For instance his work suggests that when the hydrogen (H_{2}) concentration is high (due to the anaerobic corrosion of the steel waste can) the oxidation of hydrogen at the nanoparticles will exert a protective effect on the uranium dioxide. This effect can be thought of as an example of protection by a sacrificial anode where instead of a metal anode reacting and dissolving it is the hydrogen gas which is consumed.
