= List of civilian nuclear accidents =

This article lists notable civilian accidents involving fissile nuclear material or nuclear reactors. Military accidents are listed at List of military nuclear accidents. Civil radiation accidents not involving fissile material are listed at List of civilian radiation accidents. For a general discussion of both civilian and military accidents, see Nuclear and radiation accidents.

== Scope of this article ==
In listing civilian nuclear accidents, the following criteria have been followed:

1. Notably severe: there must be well-attested and substantial health damage, property damage or contamination; if an International Nuclear Event Scale (INES) level is available, of at least two.
2. Nuclear aspect: the damage must be related directly to nuclear operations or materials; the event should involve fissile material or a reactor, not merely (for example) having occurred at the site of a nuclear power plant.
3. Primarily civilian: the nuclear operation/material must be principally for non-military purposes.

== 1950s ==
Date	Location	INES Level	Type	Description
12 December 1952	Chalk River, Ontario, Canada	5	Partial meltdown	A reactor shutoff rod failure, combined with several operator errors, led to a major power excursion of more than double the reactor's rated output at AECL's NRX reactor. The operators purged the reactor's heavy water moderator, and the reaction stopped in under 30 seconds. A subsequent cover gas system failure led to hydrogen explosions, which severely damaged the reactor core. The fission products from approximately 30 kg (66 lb) of uranium were released through the reactor stack. Contaminated light water coolant leaked from the damaged coolant circuit into the reactor building; some 4,000 m^{3} (140,000 cu ft) were pumped via pipeline to a disposal area to avoid contamination of the Ottawa River. Subsequent monitoring of surrounding water sources revealed no contamination. After the incident, approximately 1202 people were involved in the two-year-long cleanup. No immediate fatalities or injuries resulted from the incident; a 1982 follow-up study of exposed workers showed no long-term health effects, though Atomic Energy of Canada Limited (AECL) dosimetry files were lost in a 1956 fire. Future U.S. President Jimmy Carter, then a lieutenant in the U.S. Navy, was among the cleanup crew.
24 May 1958	Chalk River, Ontario, Canada	5	Fuel damaged	Due to inadequate cooling, a damaged uranium fuel rod caught fire and was torn in two as it was being removed from the core at the NRU reactor. The fire was extinguished, but not before radioactive combustion products contaminated the interior of the reactor building and, to a lesser degree, an area surrounding the laboratory site. Approximately 679 people were employed in the clean-up. A corporal named Bjarnie Hannibal Paulson who was at the cleanup did not die from his exposure but developed unusual skin cancers. Paulson had to testify at many hearings before he was awarded compensation for his radiation injuries.
25 October 1958	Vinča, Serbia (then Yugoslavia)	4	Criticality excursion, irradiation of personnel	During a subcritical counting experiment, a power buildup went undetected at the Vinca Nuclear Institute's zero-power natural uranium heavy water-moderated research reactor. Saturation of radiation detection chambers gave the researchers false readings and the level of moderator in the reactor tank was raised, triggering a power excursion which a researcher detected from the smell of ozone. Six scientists received radiation doses of 2–4 sieverts (200–400 rem) (p. 96). An experimental bone marrow transplant treatment was performed on all of them in France and five survived, despite the ultimate rejection of the marrow in all cases. A single woman among them later had a child without apparent complications. This was one of the first nuclear incidents investigated by then-newly formed IAEA.
30 December 1958	Los Alamos		Criticality excursion	Cecil Kelley, a chemical operator working on plutonium purification, switched on a stirrer on a large mixing tank, which created a vortex in the tank. The plutonium, dissolved in an organic solvent, flowed into the center of the vortex. Due to a procedural error, the mixture contained 3.27 kg of plutonium, which reached criticality for about 200 microseconds. Kelley received 3,900 to 4,900 rad (36.385 to 45.715 Sv) according to later estimates. The other operators reported seeing a bright flash of blue light and found Kelley outside, saying "I'm burning up! I'm burning up!" He died 35 hours later.
26 July 1959	Santa Susana Field Laboratory, California, United States	4	Partial meltdown	A partial core meltdown took place when the Sodium Reactor Experiment (SRE) experienced a power excursion that caused severe overheating of the reactor core, resulting in the melting of one-third of the nuclear fuel and significant release of radioactive gases. The amount of radioactivity released is disputed, with it ranging from 28 Curies to as much as 240 to 260 times worse than Three Mile Island. Over the succeeding years, the site was cleaned up and all buildings and contamination removed. The soil was removed and other soil brought in and now forms a portion of an area near the Simi Valley Adventist Hospital.

== 1960s ==
Date	Location	INES Level	Type	Description
3 April 1960	Westmoreland County, Pennsylvania, United States	4	Partial meltdown	A partial core meltdown occurred at the Westinghouse TR-2 research reactor (also known as the Westinghouse Test Reactor or Westinghouse Testing Reactor (WTR)) at their Waltz Mill site. One fuel element melted, believed due to manufacturing defects in the fuel element, resulting in fission products being released into the reactor coolant water and gaseous fission products being released to the environment. Two million gallons of contaminated water were generated during the accident and cleanup. At least a portion of the water was retained on-site in lagoons, a condition which eventually led to detectable ^{90}Sr in groundwater plus contaminated soil. The site cleanup was completed in 2013.
24 July 1964	Wood River Junction, Richmond, Rhode Island, United States	2	Criticality accident	A worker at a United Nuclear Corporation fuel facility caused an accidental criticality. Robert Peabody, believing he was using a diluted uranium solution, accidentally put concentrated solution into an agitation tank containing sodium carbonate. Peabody was exposed to 100 Gy (10,000 rad) of radiation and died two days later. Ninety minutes after the criticality, a plant manager and another administrator returned to the building and were exposed to 1 Gy (100 rad), but suffered no ill effects.
5 October 1966	Frenchtown Charter Township, Michigan, United States	4	Partial meltdown	A sodium cooling system malfunction caused the meltdown of some fuel elements at the Fermi 1 fast breeder reactor. The accident was attributed to a zirconium fragment that obstructed a flow-guide in the sodium cooling system. Two of the 105 fuel assemblies melted during the accident, but no contamination was recorded outside the containment vessel.
Winter 1966-1967 (date unknown)	Location unknown	5	Loss of coolant, possible meltdown	The Soviet icebreaker Lenin, the USSR's first nuclear-powered surface ship, suffered a major accident (possibly a nuclear meltdown – exactly what happened remains a matter of controversy in the West) in one of its three reactors. To find the leak the crew broke through the concrete and steel radiation shield with sledgehammers, causing irreparable damage. It was rumored that around 30 of the crew were killed. The ship was abandoned for a year to allow radiation levels to drop before the three reactors were removed, to be dumped into the Tsivolko Fjord on the Kara Sea, along with 60% of the fuel elements packed in a separate container. The reactors were replaced with two new ones, and the ship reentered service in 1970, serving until 1989.
May 1967	Dumfries and Galloway, Scotland, United Kingdom	4	Partial meltdown	Graphite debris partially blocked a fuel channel causing a fuel element to melt and catch fire at the Chapelcross nuclear power station. Contamination was confined to the reactor core. The core was repaired and restarted in 1969, operating until the plant's shutdown in 2004.
21 January 1969	Lucens, Canton of Vaud, Switzerland	4	Explosion, partial meltdown	A loss of coolant led to a meltdown of one fuel element and a steam explosion in the Lucens reactor, an experimental reactor in a large rock cavern at Lucens. The underground location of this reactor acted like a containment building and prevented any outside contamination. The cavern was contaminated and temporarily sealed. No injuries or fatalities resulted. Defueling and partial dismantling occurred from 1969 to 1973. In 1988, the lowest caverns were filled with concrete, and a regulatory permit was issued in December 1990. Currently, the archives of the Canton of Vaud are located in the upper caverns.

== 1970s ==
Date	Location	INES Level	Type	Description
6 February 1975	Leningrad Nuclear Power Plant		Explosion of cooling circuit	The secondary cooling circuit of Unit 1 ruptured, releasing contaminated water into the environment. Three people were killed.
7 December 1975	Greifswald, Germany (then East Germany)	3	Station blackout	A fire in a cable duct after a short circuit disabled the electrical power supply for all feedwater and emergency core cooling pumps. A power supply was improvised by the operating personnel after several hours.
22 February 1977	Jaslovské Bohunice, Slovakia (then Czechoslovakia)	4	Fuel damaged	Operators neglected to remove moisture-absorbing materials from a fuel rod assembly before loading it into the KS 150 reactor at power plant A-1. The accident resulted in damaged fuel integrity, extensive corrosion damage of fuel cladding and release of radioactivity into the plant area. The affected reactor was decommissioned following this accident.
28 March 1979	Middletown, Dauphin County, Pennsylvania, United States	5	Partial meltdown	Equipment failures, poor user interface design, and worker mistakes contributed to a loss of coolant and a partial core meltdown at the Three Mile Island Nuclear Generating Station 15 km (9.3 mi) southeast of Harrisburg. While the reactor was extensively damaged, on-site radiation exposure was under 100 millirems (less than annual exposure due to natural sources). Residents living within 10 miles of the plant received an average total dose of 8 millirems (80 μSv), which is roughly the equivalent from receiving a chest x-ray. There were no fatalities. Follow-up radiological studies predict between zero and one long-term cancer fatality.

== 1980s ==
Date	Location	INES Level	Type	Description
13 March 1980	Saint-Laurent-des-Eaux, France	4	Fuel damage	A brief power excursion in Reactor A2 led to a rupture of fuel bundles and a minor 80 GBq (2,200 mCi) release of nuclear materials at the Saint-Laurent Nuclear Power Plant. The reactor was repaired and continued operation until its decommissioning in 1992.
March 1981	Tsuruga, Japan	2	Radioactive materials released into Sea of Japan; overexposure of workers	More than 100 workers were exposed to doses of up to 1.55 mSv (155 mrem) per day radiation during repairs of the Tsuruga Nuclear Power Plant, violating the Japan Atomic Power Company's limit of 1 mSv (100 mrem) per day.
23 September 1983	Buenos Aires, Argentina	4	Accidental criticality	An operator error during a fuel plate reconfiguration in an experimental test reactor led to an excursion of 3×10^{17} fissions at the RA-2 facility. The operator absorbed 20 Gy of gamma and 17 Gy of neutron radiation which killed him two days later. Another 17 people outside the reactor room absorbed doses ranging from 350 mGy to less than 10 mGy. pg103
26 April 1986	Pripyat, Ukraine (then Ukrainian Soviet Socialist Republic, Union of Soviet Socialist Republics)	7	Power excursion, explosion, complete meltdown	An inadequate reactor safety system test led to an uncontrolled power excursion, causing a severe steam explosion, meltdown, and release of radioactive materials in unit 4 at the Chernobyl nuclear power plant located approximately 100 kilometers (60 miles) north-northwest of Kyiv. Approximately 50 fatalities (mostly cleanup personnel) resulted from the accident and the immediate aftermath. An additional nine fatal cases of thyroid cancer in children in the Chernobyl area have been attributed to the accident. The explosion and combustion of the graphite reactor core spread radioactive material over much of Europe. 100,000 people were evacuated from the areas immediately surrounding Chernobyl; in addition, 300,000 were touched from heavy fallout in Belarus, Ukraine and Russia. An "Exclusion Zone" was created surrounding the site encompassing approximately 3,000 km^{2} (1,200 sq mi) and deemed off-limits for human habitation for an indefinite period. Several studies by governments, U.N. agencies and environmental groups have estimated the consequences and eventual number of casualties. Their findings are subject to controversy.
4 May 1986	Hamm-Uentrop, Germany (then West Germany)		Fuel damaged	Spherical fuel pebbles became lodged in the pipe used to deliver fuel elements to the reactor at an experimental 300-megawatt THTR-300 HTGR. Attempts by an operator to dislodge the fuel pebble damaged the pipe, releasing activated coolant gas which was detectable up to two kilometers from the reactor.

== 1990s ==
Date	Location	INES Level	Type	Description
6 April 1993	Tomsk-7 (Seversk), Russia	4	Explosion	A pressure buildup led to an explosive mechanical failure in a 34 m^{3} (1,200 cu ft) stainless steel reaction vessel buried in a concrete bunker under building 201 of the radiochemical works at the Tomsk-7 Siberian Chemical Enterprise plutonium reprocessing facility. The vessel contained a mixture of concentrated nitric acid, 8,757 kg (19,306 lb) uranium, 449 g (15.8 oz) plutonium along with a mixture of radioactive and organic waste from a prior extraction cycle. The explosion dislodged the concrete lid of the bunker and blew a large hole in the roof of the building, releasing approximately 6 GBq (160 mCi) of Pu 239 and 30 TBq (810 Ci) of other radionuclides into the environment. The contamination plume extended 28 km (17 mi) NE of building 201, 20 km (12 mi) beyond the facility property. The small village of Georgievka (pop. 200) was at the end of the fallout plume, but no fatalities, illnesses or injuries were reported. The accident exposed 160 on-site workers and almost two thousand cleanup workers to total doses of up to 50 mSv (the threshold limit for radiation workers is 20 mSv/yr).
June 1999	Ishikawa Prefecture, Japan	2	Control rod malfunction	Operators attempting to insert one control rod during an inspection neglected procedure and instead withdrew three causing a 15-minute uncontrolled sustained reaction at the number 1 reactor of Shika Nuclear Power Plant. The Hokuriku Electric Power Company who owned the reactor did not report this incident and falsified records, covering it up until March, 2007. After examining the equipment involved, the Japan Nuclear Safety Commission concluded the event was a result of operators working under a lot of managerial pressures, and cutting corners.
30 September 1999	Ibaraki Prefecture, Japan	4	Tokaimura accidental criticality	Inadequately trained part-time workers prepared a uranyl nitrate solution containing about 16.6 kg (37 lb) of uranium, which exceeded the critical mass, into a precipitation tank at a uranium reprocessing facility in Tokai-mura northeast of Tokyo, Japan. The tank was not designed to dissolve this type of solution and was not configured to prevent eventual criticality. Three workers were exposed to (neutron) radiation doses in excess of allowable limits. Two of these workers died. 116 other workers received lesser doses of 1 mSv or greater though not in excess of the allowable limit.

== 2000s ==
Date	Location	INES Level	Type	Description
10 April 2003	Paks, Hungary	3	Fuel damaged	Partially spent fuel rods undergoing cleaning in a tank of heavy water ruptured and spilled fuel pellets at Paks Nuclear Power Plant. It is suspected that inadequate cooling of the rods during the cleaning process combined with a sudden influx of cold water thermally shocked fuel rods causing them to split. Boric acid was added to the tank to prevent the loose fuel pellets from achieving criticality. Ammonia and hydrazine were also added to absorb ^{131}I.
19 April 2005	Sellafield, England, United Kingdom	3	Nuclear material leak	20 t (20 long tons; 22 short tons) of uranium and 160 kg (350 lb) of plutonium dissolved in 83 kl (2,900 cu ft) of nitric acid leaked over several months from a cracked pipe into a stainless steel sump chamber at the Thorp nuclear fuel reprocessing plant. The partially processed spent fuel was drained into holding tanks outside the plant.
November 2005	Braidwood, Illinois, United States		Nuclear material leak	Tritium contamination of groundwater was discovered at Exelon's Braidwood station. Groundwater off site remains within safe drinking standards though the NRC is requiring the plant to correct any problems related to the release.
6 March 2006	Erwin, Tennessee, United States	2	Nuclear material leak	35 L (7.7 imp gal; 9.2 US gal) of a highly enriched uranium solution leaked during transfer into a lab at Nuclear Fuel Services Erwin Plant. The incident caused a seven-month shutdown. A required public hearing on the licensing of the plant was not held due to the absence of public notification.
4 May 2009	Paks, Hungary	2	Workplace accident	A Self Powered Neutron Detector was being transported from a reactor, through a reactor hall, to a high-activity waste storage pit. A wire rope, suspending the SPND inside a 4-meter tubular bio-shield, broke, causing the assembly to drop onto the working area of the reactor hall beneath, which had been covered with a protective material. As a result of the fall, the bio-shield was bent and tilted onto a decontamination tank containing control rod drivers. No other equipment was damaged. The SPND was later measured to be emitting in excess of 50 mSv/hr. Workers were evacuated and the reactor hall was cordoned off, but none of the staff was exposed to greater than the daily permitted limit of radiation.

== 2010s ==
Date	Location	INES Level	Type	Description
11–20 March 2011	Fukushima Daiichi ("Fukushima I") Nuclear Power Plant, Japan	7 (The INES 7 rating is as of 12 April 2011. The previous INES rating had been 5, a final rating is expected after the situation has been completely resolved)	Partial or complete meltdowns in multiple reactors	Main article: Fukushima nuclear accident After the 2011 Tōhoku earthquake and tsunami of 11 March, the emergency power supply of the Fukushima-Daiichi nuclear power plant failed. This was followed by deliberate releases of radioactive gas from reactors 1 and 2 to relieve pressure. March 12: triggered by falling water levels and exposed fuel rods, a hydrogen explosion occurred at reactor 1, resulting in the collapse of the concrete outer structure. Although the reactor containment itself was confirmed to be intact, the hourly radiation from the plant reached 1.015 mSv (0.1015 rem) – an amount equivalent to that allowable for ordinary people in one year. Residents of the Fukushima area were advised to stay inside, close doors and windows, turn off air conditioning, and to cover their mouths with masks, towels or handkerchiefs as well as not to drink tap water. By the evening of 12 March, the exclusion zone had been extended to 20 kilometres (12 mi) around the plant and 70,000 to 80,000 people had been evacuated from homes in northern Japan. March 14: a second, hydrogen explosion (nearly identical to the first explosion in Unit 1) occurred in the reactor building for Unit 3, with similar effects. March 15: a third explosion occurred in the "pressure suppression room" of Unit 2 and is initially said not to have breached the reactor's inner steel containment vessel, but later reports indicated that the explosion damaged the steel containment structure of Unit 2 and much larger releases of radiation were expected than previously. That same day, a fourth explosion damaged the 4th floor area above the reactor and spent fuel pool of the Unit 4 reactor. Contrary to the TEPCO press release, aerial photos show that most of the outer building was actually destroyed. The fuel rods (both new and spent fuel) of reactor Unit 4, stored in the now exposed spent fuel pool, were reportedly exposed to air – this would have risked the melting of the nuclear fuel. However, later research found the fuel rods had been covered by water all the time. TEPCO estimated that 70% of the fuel in Unit 1 had melted, and 33% in Unit 2, further suspecting that Unit 3's core might also be damaged. In November 2011 TEPCO released the report of the Modular Accident Analysis Program (MAAP). The report showed that the reactor pressure vessel (RPV) in Unit 1 (commonly known as the reactor core) had been damaged during the disaster, and that significant amounts of fuel had fallen into the bottom of the primary containment vessel (PCV) – the erosion of the concrete of the PCV by the molten fuel immediately after the disaster was estimated to have been stopped in approx. 0.7 metres (2 ft 4 in) depth, with the thickness of the containment being 7.6 metres (25 ft). Gas sampling done before the report detected no signs of an ongoing reaction of the fuel with the concrete of the PCV and all the fuel in Unit 1 was estimated to be "well cooled down, including the fuel dropped on the bottom of the reactor". MAAP further showed that fuel in Unit 2 and Unit 3 had melted, however less than Unit 1, and fuel was presumed to be still in the RPV, with no significant amounts of fuel fallen to the bottom of the PCV. The report further suggested that "there is a range in the evaluation results" from "most fuel in the RPV (some fuel in PCV)" in Unit 2 and Unit 3, to "all fuel in the RPV (none fuel fallen to the PCV)". For Unit 2 and Unit 3 it was estimated that the "fuel is cooled sufficiently". The larger damage in Unit 1 was according to the report due to long time that cooling water was not injected in Unit 1, letting much more decay heat accumulate – for about 1 day there was no water injection for Unit 1, while Unit 2 and Unit 3 had only a quarter of a day without water injection. As of December 2013, it was reported that TEPCO estimated for Unit 1 that "the decay heat must have decreased enough, the molten fuel can be assumed to remain in PCV (Primary container vessel)".
11 March 2011	Fukushima Daini Nuclear Power Plant, Japan	3	Loss of service cooling water	The tsunami following the 2011 Tōhoku earthquake caused the plant's seawater pumps, used to cool reactors, to fail. Of the plant's four reactors, three were in danger of meltdown.

== 2020s ==
Date	Location	INES Level	Type	Description
2022/23	Minnesota, US		Tritium-leakage	Pipe-leakage of tritiated water at Monticello Nuclear Generating Plant (Section "Incidents" there)

== See also ==
- Criticality accident
- International Nuclear Events Scale
- List of Chernobyl-related articles
- List of civilian radiation accidents
- List of industrial disasters
- List of military nuclear accidents
- List of crimes involving radioactive substances
- List of nuclear reactors – a comprehensive annotated list of the world's nuclear reactors
- Lists of nuclear disasters and radioactive incidents
- Nuclear and radiation accidents
- Nuclear reactor technology
- Nuclear power
- Nuclear power debate
- Radiation
- List of hydroelectric power station failures
