= Paks Nuclear Power Plant =

Nuclear power plant in Hungary

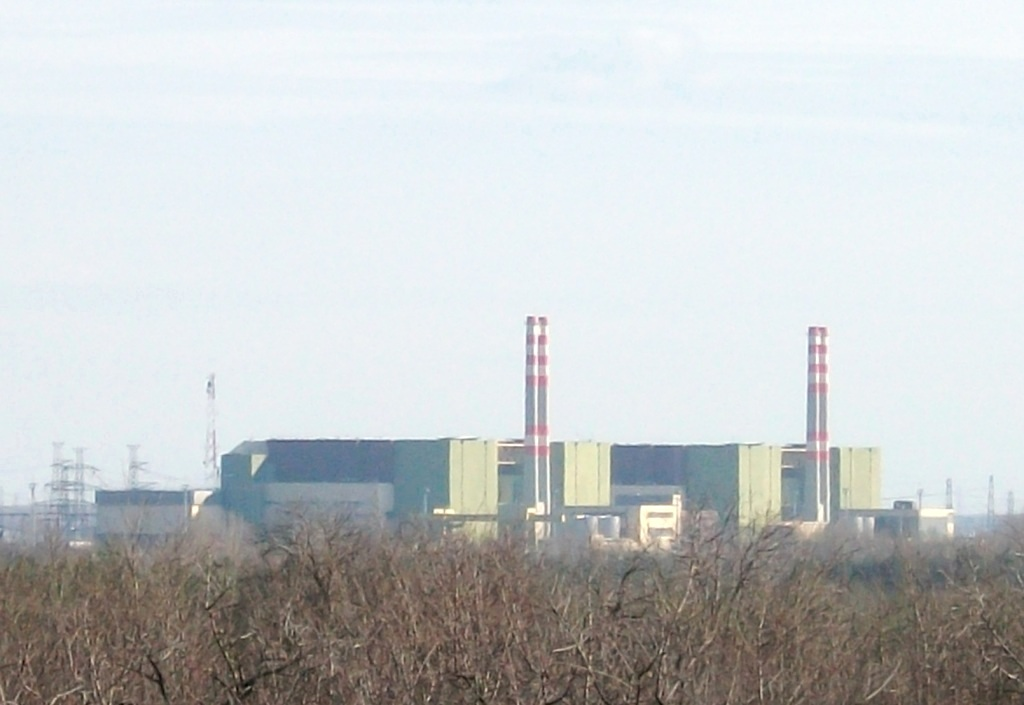
- Paks Nuclear Power Plant
- Country: Hungary
- Location: Paks
- Coordinates: 46°34′21″N 18°51′15″E
- Status: Operational
- Construction began: 1967
- Commission date: 28 December 1982
- Construction cost: Unit 5 & 6: €12.5 billion
- Owner: MVM
- Operator: Paksi Atomerőmű Zrt.

Nuclear power station
- Reactor type: VVER
- Reactor supplier: Atomstroyexport

Power generation
- Units operational: 4 x 500 MW
- Make and model: VVER-440/V213
- Units planned: 2 x 1,200 MW
- Nameplate capacity: 2,000 MW
- Capacity factor: 84.2%
- Annual net output: 14,749 GW·h

External links
- Website: atomeromu.mvm.hu
- Commons: Related media on Commons

Main entrance

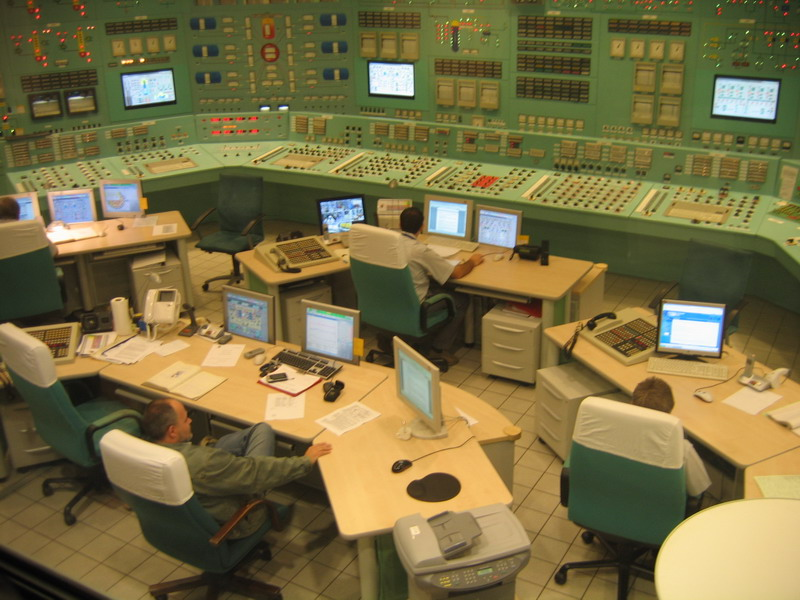
Control room

The Paks Nuclear Power Plant (Hungarian: Paksi atomerőmű) is located 5 km (3.1 mi) from the small town of Paks, central Hungary, 100 km (62 mi) southwest of Budapest on the shores of the Danube river. It is the first and only operating nuclear power station in Hungary. In 2025 its four reactors produced more than 45% of Hungary's electricity production.

== History ==
In 1974 construction began on units 1 and 2. Unit 1 first provided power to the grid in 1982.

Thanks to optimizations, modernization and fuel upgrades, it was possible to safely increase the output power of the Unit 4 reactor to 500 MWe in 2006, followed by Unit 1 in 2007. With upgrades to the remaining two units the plant's power generation reached 2000 MWe in 2009.

During the 2026 European heatwaves, water levels of the Danube dropped to record levels, so far that normal amounts of cooling water were not available to the reactors, and power output was reduced to less than 50% of capacity in late July. Prime minister Péter Magyar warned that the plant was expected to be completely powered down during the first week of August.

== Technical parameters ==
VVER is a Soviet-designed pressurized water reactor type. The number following VVER, in this case 440, represents the power output of the original design. The VVER-440 Model V213 was a product of the first uniform safety requirements drawn up by the Soviet designers. This model includes added emergency core cooling and auxiliary feedwater systems as well as upgraded accident localization systems.

Each reactor contains 42 tons of lightly enriched uranium dioxide fuel. Fuel takes on average three years to be used in the reactors; after this the fuel rods are stored for five years in an adjacent cooling pond before being removed from the site for permanent disposal.

The power plant is nearly 100% owned by state-owned power wholesaler Magyar Villamos Művek. A few shares are held by local municipalities, while a voting preference or "golden" share is held by the Hungarian government.

== Lifetime extension ==
In 2000, the Paks Nuclear Power Plant commissioned a feasibility study which concluded that the plant may remain in operation for another 20 years beyond the original 30-year design lifetime. The study was updated in 2005 with similar conclusions. In November 2005, Hungary's Parliament passed a resolution with overwhelming bipartisan majority to support the lifetime extension. The feasibility study concluded that the non-replaceable parts are in sufficient condition to remain in operation for another 20 years while a minority of replaceable parts needed replacement or refurbishment.

The power generator made repeated surveys of public opinion on the lifetime extension and concluded that support for the decision hovered near 70%.

Following the Fukushima I nuclear accidents in March 2011, Hungary's government said it would conduct a stress test on the Paks Nuclear Power Plant to assess safety, but it would not abandon plans for lifetime extension and it would also go ahead with plans for its expansion.

Unit 1 was granted a license-extension to 2032 in 2012, unit 2 to 2034 in 2014, and unit 3 to 2036 in 2016. Unit 4 got its license extended till 2037 in 2017.

The nine Ganz power generators were to be serviced by Alstom once per year between 2013 and 2021.

In 2023, plans to extend operational lifetime to 70 years were announced.

== New nuclear units ==
On 30 March 2009 the National Assembly of Hungary gave its principal consent by votes 330 for, 6 against and 10 abstentions to the preparation works of the possible new units. On 26 February 2010 the owner state company MVM Group decided the expansion with about 2 trillion Hungarian Forints price.

On 18 June 2012 the Hungarian government ranked Paks expansion as a "high priority project of the national economy", in this context established a committee (Nuclear Power Governmental Committee) for preparation of the factual steps. The Nuclear Power Governmental Committee is headed by Viktor Orbán (Prime Minister) and has two members; Mihály Varga (Minister of National Economy) and Zsuzsanna Németh (National Developmental Minister). As of 2016, Hungary is said to import 30% of its electricity.

According to the agreement signed by Zsuzsanna Németh (National Developmental Minister of Hungary) and Sergey Kiriyenko (Rosatom chairman) on 14 January 2014 Paks Nuclear Power Plant will be expanded by the Russian state company Rosatom. Eighty percent of the project's cost will be financed with a 10 billion Euro credit line from Russia. Subject to European Commission approval, construction of two VVER-1200 reactors was planned to start in 2019. On 6 March 2017, the European Commission announced its approval. János Süli, former CEO of the nuclear power station, was appointed Minister without Portfolio in the Third Orbán Government in May 2017, responsible for the planning, construction and commissioning of the two new blocks at Paks Nuclear Power Plant.

On 20 June 2019 the Paks II Zrt. (Paks II Ltd.) reported on their website that the preparation of the construction site has started including more than 80 service buildings. On 30 June 2020 the application for the construction license has been submitted to the Hungarian nuclear regulatory authority. On 26 August 2022, the regulator issued the license, and construction was expected to start within a few weeks, with completion planned for 2032.

In December 2024 Paks II acquired approval for pouring first concrete. On 5 February 2026, Paks II Zrt. reported that the initial concrete pour was completed and that Unit 5 of the Paks 2 complex is now officially under construction.

=== Cost and funding ===
According to the Paks II official website, the cost of the project is fixed at €12.5 billion. A Russian state loan of up to €10 billion is to be provided to finance 80% of the project. The sanctions placed on Russia in response to the 2022 Russian invasion of Ukraine have impeded the project. On 27 June 2025, the United States granted limited exemptions to a number of sanctioned Russian organisations to be able to finance civilian nuclear projects initiated before 21 November 2024, which Hungary stated alleviated some of these impediments. Paks II was still expected to be completed in 2032.

In May 2026, the new government of Prime Minister Péter Magyar announced a review of the status, contracts and financing for the Paks II project.

== Reactor data ==
Station	Type / Model	Net el. capacity	Gross el. capacity	Construction start	Grid date	License expires
PAKS-1	PWR / VVER-440/V213	475 MW	500 MW	1 August 1974	28 December 1982	2032
PAKS-2	PWR / VVER-440/V213	475 MW	500 MW	1 August 1974	6 September 1984	2034
PAKS-3	PWR / VVER-440/V213	475 MW	500 MW	1 October 1979	28 September 1986	2036
PAKS-4	PWR / VVER-440/V213	475 MW	500 MW	1 October 1979	16 August 1987	2037
PAKS-5	PWR / VVER-1200	1114 MW	1200 MW	5 February 2026	2032 (planned)	-
PAKS-6	PWR / VVER-1200	1114 MW	1200 MW	2026 (planned)	2032 (planned)	-

== Incidents ==
=== Major incidents (INES >0) ===
==== 2003 incident (INES 3) ====
An INES level 3 event ("serious incident") occurred on 10 April 2003 at the Unit 2 reactor. The incident occurred in the fuel rod cleaning system located under 10 metres (33 ft) of water in a cleaning tank next to the spent fuel cooling pond, located adjacent to the reactor in the reactor hall. The reactor had been shut down for its annual refueling and maintenance period on 28 March and its fuel elements removed.

The cleaning system had been installed to remove dirt and corrosion from fuel elements and control rods during shutdown, as there had previously been problems with magnetite corrosion products from the steam generators being deposited on the fuel elements which affected the flow of coolant. The sixth set of thirty partially spent elements were in the tank having been cleaned, the cleaning having finished at 16:00. At 21:50, radiation alarms mounted on the cleaning system detected a sudden increase in the amount of krypton-85. The suspicion was that one of the fuel rod assemblies was leaking. At 22:30, the reactor hall was evacuated because of elevated radiation levels both there and in the ventilation stack.

At 02:15 the following morning, the hydraulic lock of the cleaning vessel lid was released, and immediately the dose rate increased significantly (6-12 millisieverts/hour) around the spent fuel pond and the pool containing the cleaning machine, and the water level dropped for a short time, by about 7 cm (2.8 in). Water samples from the pond showed contamination due to damaged fuel rods. The lid on the cleaning machine was winched up at 04:20, but one of the three lifting cables attached to it broke; and it was not finally removed until 16 April.

The incident was initially given an INES rating of 2 ("incident"). However a video examination of the damaged fuel elements following the successful removal of the lid caused the rating to be raised to 3 ("serious incident"). This revealed that cladding on the majority of the 30 fuel elements had been broken, with radioactive spent uranium fuel pellets spilling from the elements into the bottom of the cleaning tank. Apart from the release of radioactive material, a concern was that the accumulation of a compact mass of fuel pellets could lead to a criticality accident, as the pellets were in a tank of neutron moderating water. Water containing neutron absorbing boric acid was added into the tank to raise its concentration to 16 g/kg to prevent this. Ammonia and hydrazine were also added to the water to help with the removal of radioactive iodine-131.

An investigation by the Hungarian Atomic Energy Agency concluded that the cause of the incident was inadequate cooling of the fuel elements, which were heated due to the radioactive decay of short-lived fission products. These were kept cool by water circulated by a submerged water pump. However the cooling was inadequate, leading to the damage to some elements through a build-up of steam around them, depriving them of most of their cooling. The investigation proposed that the severe damage probably occurred when the lid was released, causing thermal shock to cladding because of the sudden entry of cool water into the system, and explosive steam production.

One of the interesting results of the investigation was that the Hungarian Atomic Agency had placed too much trust in the technology and knowledge of the French Framatome Company. The agency did not investigate documentation provided by the company deeply enough, missing a fatal design flaw in the Framatome-designed, produced, and operated cleaning equipment.

The discharge of radioactive gases through the stack continued for several days after the incident, although the Hungarian Atomic Energy Agency determined that the radiation levels adjacent to the plant were only about 10% above normal. However, the reactor remained out of service for over a year, finally resuming commercial electricity production in September 2004.

The damaged fuel was completely removed by the end of 2006 and in 2014 transported to Russia for final disposal.

==== 2005 incident (INES 1) ====
On 9 April 2005, Unit 1 was shut down for planned maintenance. The defect that occurred during the cooling of the block was classified as INES grade 1 (abnormality), although the power plant originally requested a zero rating.

==== 2009 outage incident (INES 2) ====
A Self Powered Neutron Detector (SPND) was dropped when the wire rope holding it broke during an outage on 4 May 2009. The event was rated as INES 2. All staff were safely evacuated, and no member was exposed to more than the permitted daily radiation dose.

==== 2012 incident (INES 1) ====
On 6 September 2012, scheduled work was done on a gate, but the required written instructions were not completed in time. This is an administrative mismatch and was classified as 1 in the International Nuclear Event Scale (INES).

=== Incidents below the International Nuclear Event Scale (INES) ===
Malfunctions (operational events) below the International Nuclear Event Scale (INES) are published quarterly by the MVM Paks Nuclear Power Plant. According to IAEA, these mean no risk, yet a part of these resulted in partial or complete block shutdowns.

==== 2016 incident ====
On the morning of 14 July 2016 reactor 1 was automatically shut down due to an equipment malfunction, which did not pose any safety threat. The reactor was brought back to full capacity the afternoon of the following day with the malfunction to be reviewed by the national regulator. The shut down came one week after a separate malfunction of a generator forced the plant to reduce its power output.

== See also ==
- Energy in Hungary
- Nuclear power in Hungary
