= Residual heat removal system =

Safety system in nuclear reactors

After shutdown of a nuclear reactor, the core continues to produce decay heat due to the nuclear decay of fission products created during reactor operation. In a boiling-water or pressurized-water reactor (BWR or PWR), the residual heat removal system (RHR system) is used to remove this decay heat, and also serves safety functions during an accident. The RHR system may also be called the decay heat removal system or the shutdown cooling system.

== Normal operations ==
Post-shutdown, the heat generation in a water-moderated nuclear reactor comes from two mechanisms: (1) the fission caused by delayed neutrons and (2) the fission of isotopes generated during the previous normal operation. Initially, both mechanisms contribute to the heating almost equally, totaling about 6% of full reactor power, but the first component decays quickly: its half-life is approximately 80 seconds. The second mechanism decays much slower, and can generate as much as 1% of the nominal reactor power after a day. The RHR system is used to remove the resultant decay heat from the core.

=== PWRs ===
The reactor coolant system (RCS) is first cooled from operational temperatures via the secondary side: steam (not radioactive) is produced in the steam generators and dumped to the main condenser or directly to atmosphere. Once the reactor is cool enough to allow safe RHR operation, reactor coolant is routed through the RHR pump and heat exchanger to further reduce the temperature to cold shutdown conditions. The RHR heat exchanger is cooled by the component cooling water system (CCS), an intermediate cooling loop provided between radioactive systems and the outside environment, to reduce the likelihood of contamination.

=== BWRs ===
RHR performs the same low-temperature shutdown function in BWRs as in PWRs. On initial reactor shutdown, reactor coolant temperature is first reduced via dumping steam to the main condenser via the turbine bypass valves. When RCS pressure is less than approximately 50 psig, the RHR pump and heat exchanger are used to achieve cold shutdown. The main difference from the PWR configuration is the lack of an intermediate system between the radioactive reactor coolant and the environment.

== Safety function (Accident operations) ==
The RHR system also has a safety function as the low-pressure branch of the emergency core cooling system (ECCS).

=== PWRs ===
The RHR system serves as the low pressure, high-flow source of emergency core cooling. If a large break loss-of-coolant accident (LOCA) occurs, it will inject borated water from the refueling water storage tank (RWST) into the core to provide cooling and absorb neutrons. On exhaustion of the RWST, the RHR system is realigned to recirculate water from the containment sump back into the core, cooling it first via the RHR heat exchanger. If the loss-of-coolant is due to a small break, reactor pressure may remain too high for RHR injection; in this case, during the initial injection phase from the RWST, the high- and intermediate-pressure branches of the ECCS are used instead. During the recirculation phase, the ECCS is aligned such that the high- and intermediate-pressure pumps take suction from the containment sump via the RHR pump and heat exchanger; this ensures cooling of the sump water and adequate suction head (NPSH) for the high-pressure pumps.

=== BWRs ===
The RHR system serves as the low pressure coolant injection (LPCI) system. During a LOCA, the RHR pumps take suction from the suppression pool and circulate water through the RHR heat exchanger and into the coolant recirculation loops, and thence into the core. The RHR loop may also serve a containment spray function to condense steam and reduce the pressure and temperature in containment. The LPCI mode may operate even on small or intermediate breaks when reactor pressure normally remains high, thanks to the operation of the automatic depressurization system (ADS), which reduces reactor pressure to a point where LPCI can inject cooling water.

== See also ==
- Decay heat
- Nuclear reactor coolant
- Light-water reactor
- Auxiliary feedwater
- Nuclear reactor safety system
- Boiling water reactor safety systems
