= Nuclear power in Hungary =

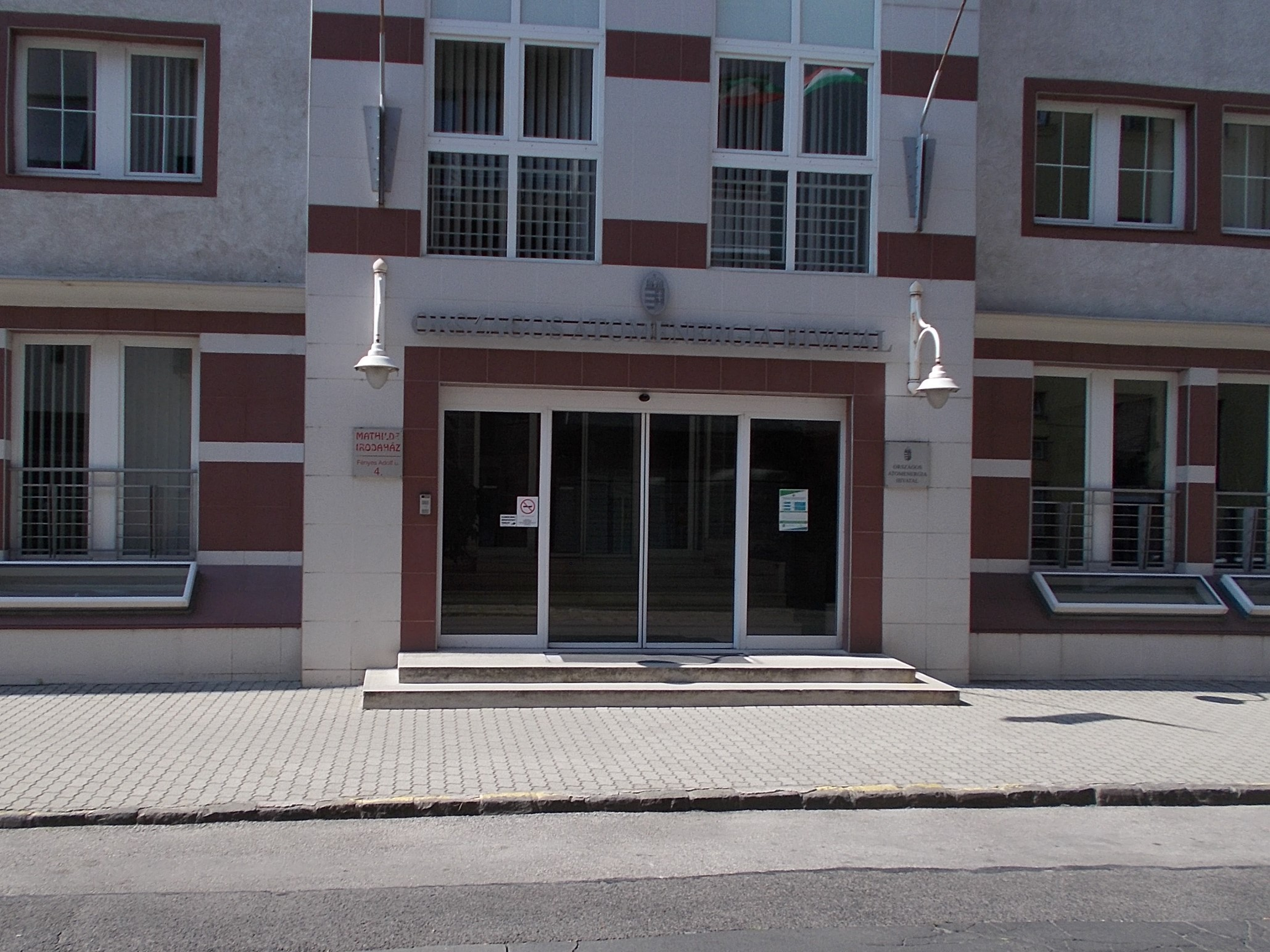
Nuclear Energy Office Headquarters in Budapest

In Hungary, nuclear energy plays a decisive role in the national energy mix, While in 2006, only 38 percent of the country's electricity came from nuclear fission, by 2014 that proportion had risen to over 53 percent. It is predicted that rate of around 50 percent will be permanent in the near future. In 2025, nuclear power produced approximately 45% of the country’s electricity.

== Beginnings ==
The first Hungarian nuclear reactor was built at Csillebérc (located in Budapest's 12th district) in 1959 as a 2 MWe reactor. This has since been refurbished and modified several times, and after its recent conversion its capacity has increased to 10 MW. The reactor was primarily used for research purposes, as well as for the training of the future Hungarian nuclear experts. Experience with the first nuclear reactor has been also used at the Paks Nuclear Power Plant.

== Hungarian nuclear power plants ==
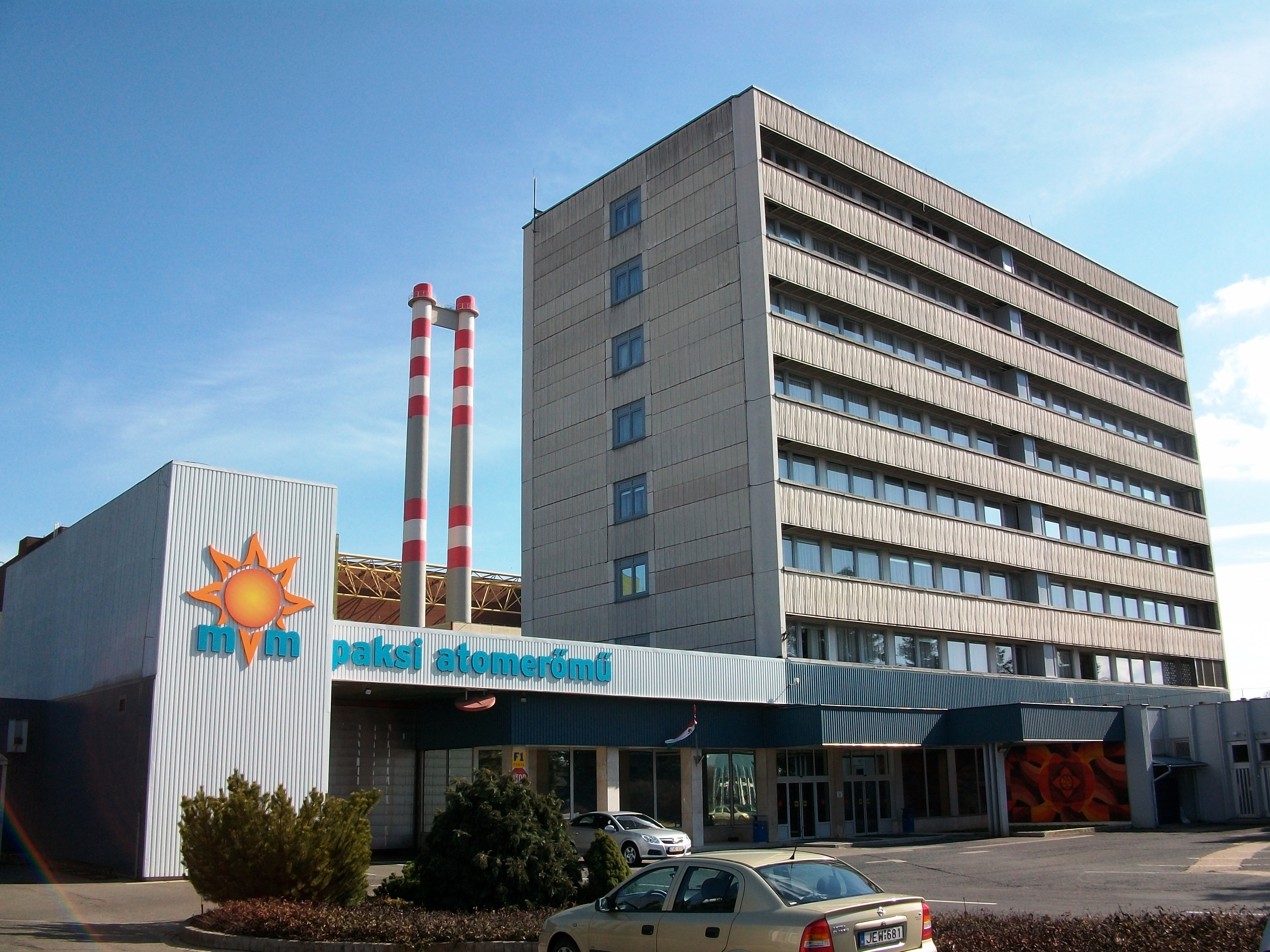
Main entrance of the Paks Nuclear Power Plant

Construction of the first Hungarian commercial nuclear reactors began after the oil crisis in 1974. The Paks Nuclear Power Plant Company (PAV) was founded on 1 January 1976. The first reactor was completed in 1982. Currently, in the Paks Nuclear Power Plant, there are four nuclear reactors with a net output capacity of 1,826 MWe. VVER is the Soviet designation for a pressurized water reactor. The number following VVER, in this case 440, represents the power output of the original design in megawatts (MW). The VVER-440 Model V213 was a product of the first uniform safety requirements drawn up by the Soviet designers. This model includes added emergency core cooling and auxiliary feedwater systems as well as upgraded accident localization systems. Originally, these plants had expected lives of 30 years; however, the Hungarian government decided to complete 20-year life extension projects on the reactors. The cost of these projects will amount to approximately $900 million, but will also increase total capacity to 2,000 MWe. Hungary also had plans to build two more reactors with capacities of 950 MWe each, but cancelled the plans due to decreased power demand in the early 1990s.

Hungary receives all of its uranium fuel from TVEL in Russia. Spent fuel is normally disposed of without reprocessing, though there are instances of spent fuel being sent to Russia for reprocessing. The spent fuel that is not reprocessed is kept at the nuclear reactor site for five years in pools and then sent to dry storage. Additionally, in 2005 the residents of Bátaapáti, in South Hungary, approved construction plans for low- and intermediate-level waste storage facility. Parliament approved this construction in November 2005. The costs of this construction will be covered by the Central Nuclear Financial Fund, the fund the nuclear power companies pay into. In December 2012, the storage facility started operation by receiving its first batch of nuclear waste. The construction costs were 68 billion forint (approx. $310 million).

== Future ==
In January 2014, the Russian President and the Hungarian Prime Minister, Vladimir Putin and Viktor Orbán, agreed to build two VVER reactor units at the Paks Nuclear Power Plant. According to the €10 billion ($11 billion) intergovernmental agreement two new power units with the capacity of 1200 MW each will be constructed and are expected to start by 2030.

In February 2026, construction officially began on Unit 5 of the Paks II nuclear power plant, involving two Russian-designed VVER-1200 reactors developed by Rosatom. However, the new government led by Prime Minister Péter Magyar announced a review of the project's costs and contractual arrangements.
