= Zirconium alloys =

Zircaloy family

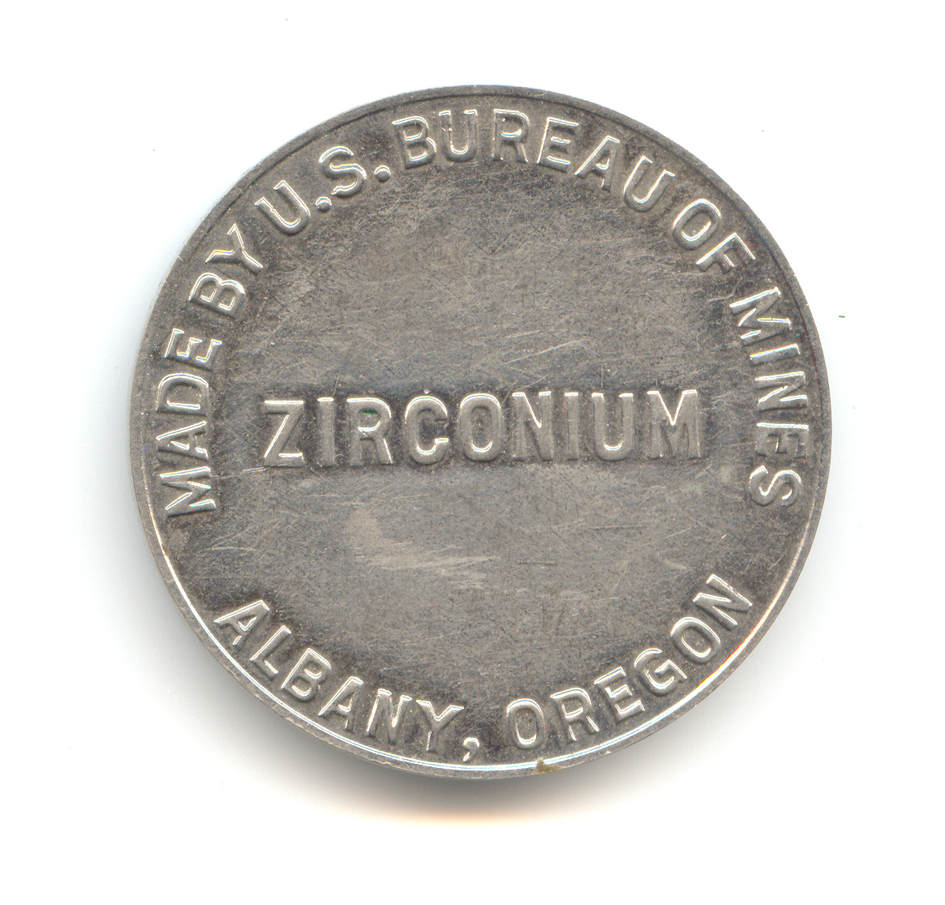
Medal minted in zirconium, with the metal produced from 1947 by the Albany Metallurgical Research Center for the manufacture of the nuclear reactor of the submarine Nautilus

Zirconium alloys are solid solutions of zirconium or other metals, a common subgroup having the trade mark Zircaloy. Zirconium has very low absorption cross-section of thermal neutrons, high hardness, ductility and corrosion resistance. One of the main uses of zirconium alloys is in nuclear technology, as cladding of fuel rods in nuclear reactors, especially water reactors. A typical composition of nuclear-grade zirconium alloys is more than 95 weight percent zirconium and less than 2% of tin, niobium, iron, chromium, nickel and other metals, which are added to improve mechanical properties and corrosion resistance.

The water cooling of reactor zirconium alloys elevates requirement for their resistance to oxidation-related nodular corrosion. Furthermore, oxidative reaction of zirconium with water releases hydrogen gas, which partly diffuses into the alloy and forms zirconium hydrides. The hydrides are less dense and are weaker mechanically than the alloy; their formation results in blistering and cracking of the cladding – a phenomenon known as hydrogen embrittlement.

== Production and properties ==
Commercial non-nuclear grade zirconium typically contains 1–5% of hafnium, whose neutron absorption cross-section is 600 times that of zirconium. Hafnium must therefore be almost entirely removed (reduced to < 0.02% of the alloy) for reactor applications.

Nuclear-grade zirconium alloys contain more than 95% Zr, and therefore most of their properties are similar to those of pure zirconium. The absorption cross section for thermal neutrons is 0.18 barn for zirconium, which is much lower than that for such common metals as iron (2.4 barn) and nickel (4.5 barn). The composition and the main applications of common reactor-grade alloys are summarized below. These alloys contain less than 0.3% of iron and chromium and 0.1–0.14% oxygen.

Alloy	Sn, %	Nb, %	Vendor (country)	Component	Reactor type
Zircaloy 2	1.2–1.7	–	All vendors	Cladding, structural components	BWR, CANDU
Zircaloy 4	1.2–1.7	–	All vendors	Cladding, structural components	BWR, PWR, CANDU
ZIRLO	0.7–1	1	Westinghouse	Cladding	BWR, PWR
Zr Sponge	–	–	Japan and Russia	Cladding	BWR
ZrSn	0.25	–	Westinghouse	Cladding	BWR
Zr2.5Nb	–	2.4–2.8	Fabrica de Aleaciones Especiales(FAE)(Argentina)	Pressure tube	CANDU
E110	–	0.9–1.1	Russia	Cladding	VVER
E125	–	2.5	Russia	Pressure tube	RBMK
E635	0.8–1.3	0.8–1	Russia	Structural components	VVER
M5	–	0.8–1.2	Areva	Cladding, structural components	PWR

^{*}ZIRLO stands for zirconium low oxidation.

== Microstructure ==
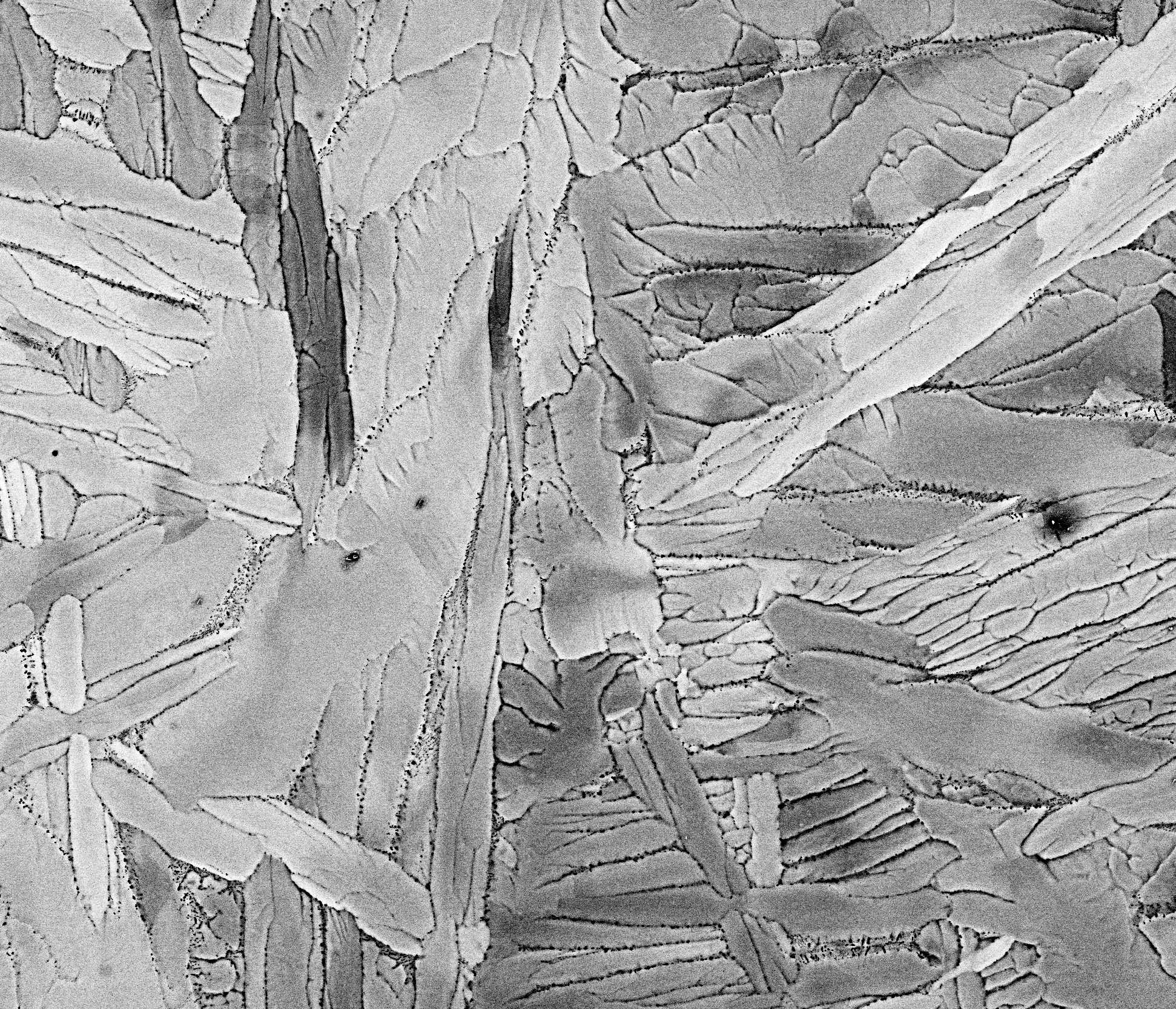
Scanning electron micrograph showing the microstructure of Zircaloy-4.

At temperatures below 1100 K, zirconium alloys belong to the hexagonal crystal family (HCP). Its microstructure, revealed by chemical attack, shows needle-like grains typical of a Widmanstätten pattern. Upon annealing below the phase transition temperature (α-Zr to β-Zr) the grains are equiaxed with sizes varying from 3 to 5 μm.

== Development ==
Zircaloy 1 was developed after zirconium was selected by Admiral H.G. Rickover as the structural material for high flux zone reactor components and cladding for fuel pellet tube bundles in prototype submarine reactors in the late 1940s. The choice was owing to a combination of strength, low neutron cross section and corrosion resistance. Zircaloy-2 was inadvertently developed, by melting Zircaloy-1 in a crucible previously used for stainless steel. Newer alloys are Ni-free, including Zircaloy-4, ZIRLO and M5 (with 1% niobium).

== Oxidation of zirconium alloy ==
Zirconium alloys readily react with oxygen, forming a nanometer-thin passivation layer. The corrosion resistance of the alloys may degrade significantly when some impurities (e.g. more than 40 ppm of carbon or more than 300 ppm of nitrogen) are present. Corrosion resistance of zirconium alloys is enhanced by intentional development of thicker passivation layer of black lustrous zirconium oxide. Nitride coatings might also be used.

Whereas there is no consensus on whether zirconium and zirconium alloy have the same oxidation rate, Zircaloys 2 and 4 do behave very similarly in this respect. Oxidation occurs at the same rate in air or in water and proceeds in ambient condition or in high vacuum. A sub-micrometer thin layer of zirconium dioxide is rapidly formed in the surface and stops the further diffusion of oxygen to the bulk and the subsequent oxidation. The dependence of oxidation rate R on temperature and pressure can be expressed as

R = 13.9·P^{1/6}·exp(−1.47/k_{B}T)

The oxidation rate R is here expressed in gram/(cm^{2}·second); P is the pressure in atmosphere, that is the factor P^{1/6} = 1 at ambient pressure; the activation energy is 1.47 eV; k_{B} is the Boltzmann constant (8.617×10^{−5} eV/K) and T is the absolute temperature in kelvins.

Thus the oxidation rate R is 10^{−20} g per 1 m^{2} area per second at 0 °C, 6×10^{−8} g m^{−2} s^{−1} at 300 °C, 5.4 mg m^{−2} s^{−1} at 700 °C and 300 mg m^{−2} s^{−1} at 1000 °C. Whereas there is no clear threshold of oxidation, it becomes noticeable at macroscopic scales at temperatures of several hundred °C.

== Oxidation of zirconium by steam ==
One disadvantage of metallic zirconium is in the case of a loss-of-coolant accident in a nuclear reactor. Zirconium cladding rapidly reacts with water steam above 1,500 K (1,230 °C). Oxidation of zirconium by water is accompanied by release of hydrogen gas. This oxidation is accelerated at high temperatures, e.g. inside a reactor core if the fuel assemblies are no longer completely covered by liquid water and insufficiently cooled. Metallic zirconium is then oxidized by the protons of water to form hydrogen gas according to the following redox reaction:

Zr + 2 H_{2}O → ZrO_{2} + 2 H_{2}

Zirconium cladding in the presence of D_{2}O deuterium oxide frequently used as the moderator and coolant in next gen pressurized heavy water reactors that CANDU designed nuclear reactors use would express the same oxidation on exposure to deuterium oxide steam as follows:

Zr + 2 D_{2}O → ZrO_{2} + 2 D_{2}

This exothermic reaction, although only occurring at high temperature, is similar to that of alkali metals (such as sodium or potassium) with water. It also closely resembles the anaerobic oxidation of iron by water (reaction used at high temperature by Antoine Lavoisier to produce hydrogen for his experiments).

This reaction was responsible for a small hydrogen explosion accident first observed inside the reactor building of Three Mile Island Nuclear Generating Station in 1979 that did not damage the containment building. This same reaction occurred in boiling water reactors 1, 2 and 3 of the Fukushima Daiichi Nuclear Power Plant (Japan) after reactor cooling was interrupted by related earthquake and tsunami events during the disaster of March 11, 2011, leading to the Fukushima Daiichi nuclear accident. Hydrogen gas was vented into the reactor maintenance halls and the resulting explosive mixture of hydrogen with air oxygen detonated. The explosions severely damaged external buildings and at least one containment building. The reaction also occurred during the Chernobyl Accident, when the steam from the reactor began to escape. Many water cooled reactor containment buildings have catalyst-based passive autocatalytic recombiner units installed to rapidly convert hydrogen and oxygen into water at room temperature before the explosive limit is reached.

== Formation of hydrides and hydrogen embrittlement ==
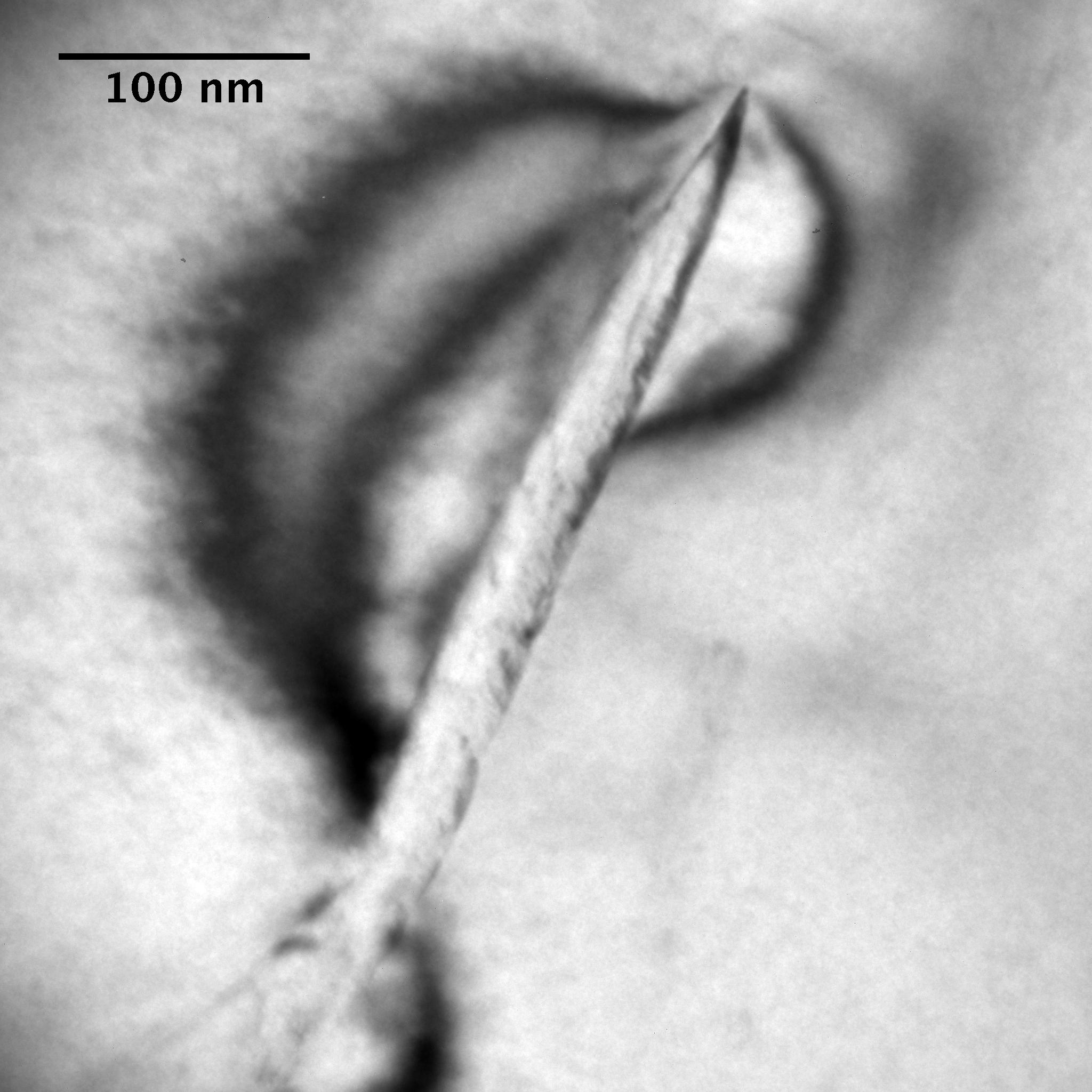
Bright-Field Transmission Electron Microscopy (BF-TEM) micrograph of a zirconium hydride in the microstructure of Zircaloy-4.

In the above oxidation scenario, 5–20% of the released hydrogen diffuses into the zirconium alloy cladding forming zirconium hydrides. The hydrogen production process also mechanically weakens the rods cladding because the hydrides have lower ductility and density than zirconium or its alloys, and thus blisters and cracks form upon hydrogen accumulation. This process is also known as hydrogen embrittlement. It has been reported that the concentration of hydrogen within hydrides is also dependent on the nucleation site of the precipitates. Optical microscopy of hydride morphology suggests that radial hydride density can be decreased by intentionally inducing circumferential hydrides in cladding.

In case of loss-of-coolant accident (LOCA) in a damaged nuclear reactor, hydrogen embrittlement accelerates the degradation of the zirconium alloy cladding of the fuel rods exposed to high temperature steam.

== Deformation ==
Zirconium alloys are used in the nuclear industry as fuel rod cladding due to zirconium's high strength and low neutron absorption cross-section. It can be subject to high strain rate loading conditions during forming and in the case of a reactor accident. In this context, the relationship between strain rate-dependent mechanical properties, crystallographic texture and deformation modes, such as slip and deformation twinning.

=== Slip ===
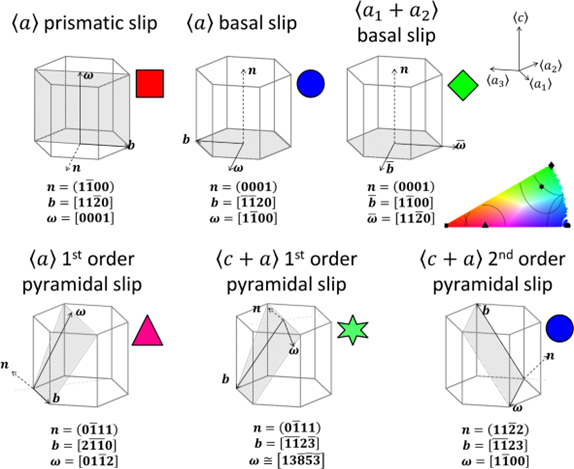
Slip systems in zirconium alloys. 𝒃 and 𝒏 are the slip direction and plane, respectively, and 𝝎 is the rotation axis calculated in the present work, orthogonal to both the slip plane normal and slip direction. The crystal direction of the rotation axis vectors is labelled on the IPF colour key.

Zirconium has a hexagonal close-packed crystal structure (HCP) at room temperature, where 〈𝑎〉prismatic slip has the lowest critical resolved shear stress. 〈𝑎〉 slip is orthogonal to the unit cell 〈𝑐〉 axis and, therefore, cannot accommodate deformation along〈𝑐〉. To make up the five independent slip modes and allow arbitrary deformation in a polycrystal, secondary deformation systems such as twinning along pyramidal planes and 〈𝑐 + 𝑎〉slip on either 1st order or 2nd order pyramidal planes play an important role in Zr polycrystal deformation. Therefore, the relative activity of deformation slip and twinning modes as a function of texture and strain rate is critical in understanding deformation behaviour. Anisotropic deformation during processing affects the texture of the final Zr part; understanding the relative predominance of deformation twinning and slip is important for texture control in processing and predicting likely failure modes in-service.

The known deformation systems in Zr are shown in Figure 1. The preferred room temperature slip system with the lowest critical resolved shear stress (CRSS) in dilute Zr alloys is 〈𝑎〉 prismatic slip. The CRSS of 〈𝑎〉prismatic slip increases with interstitial content, notably oxygen, carbon and nitrogen, and decreases with increasing temperature. 〈𝑎〉basal slip in high purity single crystal Zr deformed at a low strain rate of 10^{−4} s^{−1} was only seen at temperatures above 550 °C. At room temperature, basal slip is seen to occur in small amounts as a secondary slip system to 〈𝑎〉 prismatic slip, and is promoted during high strain rate loading. In-room temperature deformation studies of Zr, 〈𝑎〉 basal slip is sometimes ignored and has been shown not to affect macroscopic stress-strain response at room temperature. However, single crystal room temperature microcantilever tests in commercial purity Zr show that 〈𝑎〉 basal slip has only 1.3 times higher CRSS than 〈𝑎〉 prismatic slip, which would imply significant activation in polycrystal deformation given a favourable stress state. 1st order 〈𝑐 + 𝑎〉 pyramidal slip has a 3.5 times higher CRSS than 〈𝑎〉 prismatic slip. Slip on 2nd-order pyramidal planes are rarely seen in Zr alloys, but 〈𝑐 + 𝑎〉 1st-order pyramidal slip is commonly observed. Jensen and Backofen observed localised shear bands with 〈𝑐 + 𝑎〉 dislocations on {112̅ 4} planes during 〈𝑐〉 axis loading, which led to ductile fracture at room temperature, but this is not the slip plane as 〈𝑐 + 𝑎〉 vectors do not lie in {112̅ 4} planes.

=== Deformation twinning ===
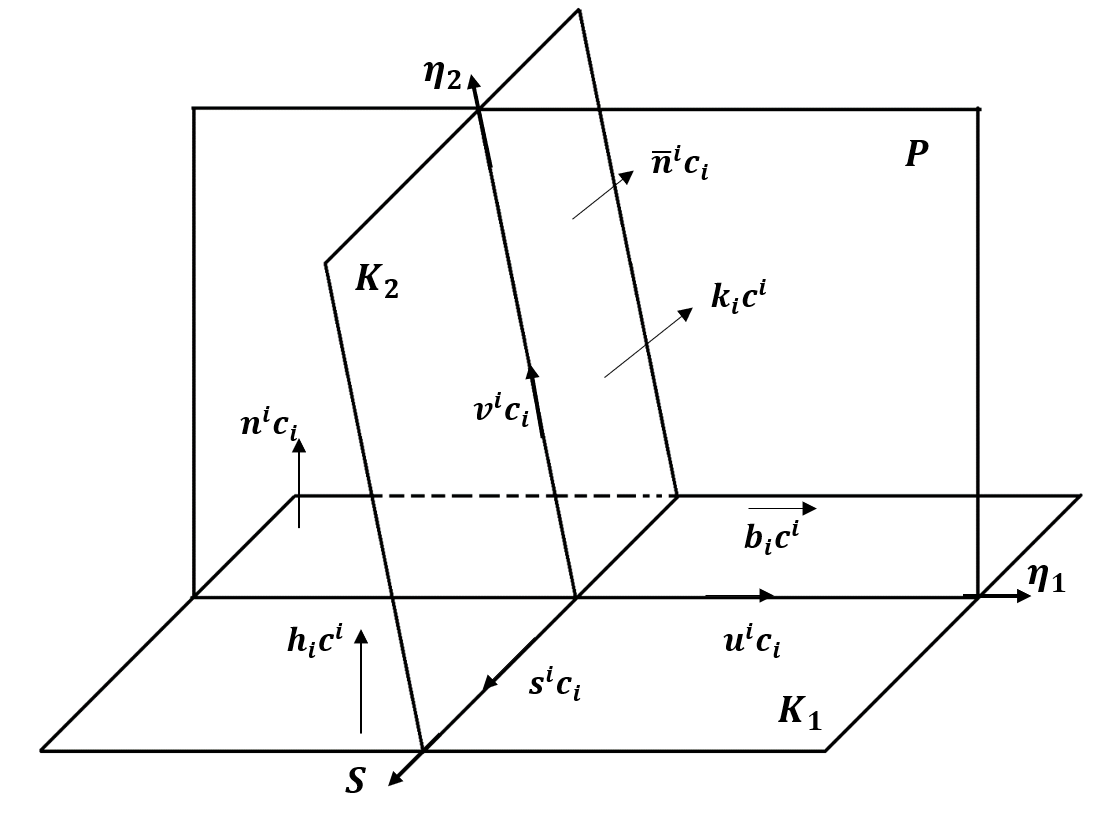
Deformation twinning crystallographic planes

Deformation twinning produces a coordinated shear transformation in a crystalline material. Twin types can be classed as either contraction (C1, C2) or extension (T1, T2) twins, which accommodate strain either to contract or extend the <𝑐> axis of the hexagonal close-packed (HCP) unit cell. Twinning is crystallographically defined by its twin plane 𝑲_{𝟏}, the mirror plane in the twin and parent material, and 𝜼_{𝟏,} which is the twinning shear direction. Deformation twins in Zr are generally lenticular in shape, lengthening in the 𝜼_{𝟏} direction and thickening along the 𝑲_{𝟏} plane normal.

The twin plane, shear direction, and shear plane form the basis vectors of an orthogonal set. The axis-angle misorientation relationship between the parent and twin is a rotation of angle 𝜉 about the shear plane's normal direction 𝑷.

More generally, twinning can be described as a 180° rotation about an axis (𝜼_{𝟏} or 𝑲_{𝟏} normal direction), or a mirror reflection in a plane (𝑲_{𝟏} or 𝜼_{𝟏} normal plane). The predominant twin type in zirconium is 𝑲_{𝟏} = {101̅2} 𝜼_{𝟏} = <101̅1> (T1) twinning, and for this {101̅2}<101̅1> twin, there is no distinction between the four transformations, as they are equivalent.

Due to symmetry in the HCP crystal structure, six crystallographically equivalent twin variants exist for each type. Different twin variants of the same type in grain cannot be distinguished by their axis-angle disorientation to the parent, which are the same for all variants of a twin type. Still, they can be distinguished apart using their absolute orientations with respect to the loading axis, and in some cases (depending on the sectioning plane), the twin boundary trace.

The primary twin type formed in any sample depends on the strain state and rate, temperature and crystal orientation. In macroscopic samples, this is typically influenced strongly by the crystallographic texture, grain size, and competing deformation modes (i.e., dislocation slip), combined with the loading axis and direction. The T1 twin type dominates at room temperature and quasi-static strain rates. Twin types present at liquid nitrogen temperature are {112̅2}〈112̅3̅〉(C1 twinning) and {101̅2}〈101̅1〉 (T1 twinning). Secondary twins of another type may form inside the primary twins as the crystal is reoriented with respect to the loading axis. The C2 compressive twin system {101̅1}〈1̅012〉 is only active at high temperatures, and is activated in preference to basal slip during deformation at 550 °C.

=== Creep Mechanism ===
The deformation of a material under constant stress, especially at high temperatures is called Creep (deformation). The three main states of creep are primary, secondary, also known as steady-state, and tertiary. During steady-state creep, diffusion or dislocation mechanisms can dominate. Deformation maps can visually display the dominating creep mechanisms with respect to varying temperature and stress. For Zirconium Carbide (ZrC), a transitional metal carbide, the deformation map is provided in Frost and Ashby. According to Hayes et al., zirconium behaves like class II metals. This means that at low temperatures and low stresses, it has a stress component (n) of ~1. This is the Harper-Dorn creep, dominated by grain boundary diffusion. As stress increases, the stress exponent increases to ~6, which would be in the power-law creep, dominated by dislocations. Above stresses 2×10^{−3}, power-law breakdown is reached. There are many ways to potentially improve the creep resistance of zirconium, such as the addition of alloying elements and/or applying different processing techniques. The most common doping elements are magnesium, yttrium, calcium, and cerium. Wen et al., utilized simulation and experimental testing to show that the deformation mechanisms of zircaloy-4 were affected by dislocation density and solute strengthening.

An important application of zirconium alloys is as cladding for nuclear reactors. Therefore, the creep effects of irradiation are significant. Many researchers have reported lower values of creep in irradiated zircaloy alloys- meaning that irradiation increases creep resistance.

=== Influence of loading conditions on deformation modes ===
Kaschner and Gray observe that yield stress increases with increasing strain rate in the range of 0.001 s^{−1} and 3500 s^{−1}, and that the strain rate sensitivity in the yield stress is higher when uniaxially compressing along texture components with predominantly prismatic planes than basal planes. They conclude that the rate sensitivity of the flow stress is consistent with Peierls forces inhibiting dislocation motion in low-symmetry metals during slip-dominated deformation. This is valid in the early stages of room temperature deformation, which in Zr is usually slip-dominated.

Samples compressed along texture components with predominantly prismatic planes yield at lower stresses than texture components with predominantly basal planes, consistent with the higher critical resolved shear stress for <𝑐 + 𝑎> pyramidal slip compared to <𝑎> prismatic slip. In a transmission electron microscopy study of room temperature deformed zirconium, McCabe et al. observed only <𝑎> dislocations in samples with prismatic texture, which were presumed to lie on prismatic planes. Both <𝑎> (prismatic) and <112̅3̅> <𝑐 + 𝑎> ({101̅1} pyramidal) slip were observed in samples with basal texture at room temperature, but only <𝑎> dislocations were observed in the same sample at liquid nitrogen temperature.

At quasi-static strain rates, McCabe et al. only observed T1 twinning in samples compressed along a plate direction with a prismatic texture component along the loading axis. They did not observe T1 twinning in samples compressed along basal textures to 25% strain. Kaschner and Gray observe that deformation at high strain rates (3000s^{−1}) produces more twins than at quasi-static strain rates, but the twin types activated were not identified.

Capolungo et al. studied twinning as a function of grain orientation within a sample. They calculated a global Schmid factor using the macroscopic applied stress direction. They found the resolved shear stress on any grain without considering local intergranular interactions, which may alter the stress state. They found that although the majority of twins occur in grains favourably oriented for twinning according to the global Schmid factor, around 30% of grains which were unfavourably oriented for twinning still contained twins. Likewise, the twins present were not always of the highest global Schmid factor variant, with only 60% twinning on the highest Schmid factor variant. This can be attributed to a strong dependence on the local stress conditions in grains or grain boundaries, which is difficult to measure experimentally, particularly at high strain rates. Knezevic et al. fitted experimental data of high-purity polycrystalline Zr to a self-consistent viscoplastic model to study slip and twinning systems' rate and temperature sensitivity. They found that T1 twinning was the dominant slip system at room temperature for strain rates between 10^{−3} and 10^{3} s^{−1}. The basal slip did not contribute to deformation below 400°C. Twinning was found to be rate insensitive, and the rate sensitivity of slip could explain changes in twinning behaviour as a function of strain rate.

T1 twinning occurs during both quasi-static and high-rate loading. T2 twinning occurs only at high rate loading. Similar area fractions of T1 and T2 twinning are activated at a high strain rate, but T2 twinning carries more plastic deformation due to its higher twinning shear. T1 twins tend to thicken with incoherent boundary traces in preference to lengthening along the twinning plane, and in some cases, nearly consume the entire parent grain. Several variants of T1 twins can nucleate in the same grain, and the twin tips are pinched at grain interiors. On the other hand, T2 twins preferentially lengthen instead of thicken, and tend to nucleate in parallel rows of the same variant extending from boundary to boundary.

For commercially pure zirconium (CP-Zr) of 97.0%, basal, 〈𝑎〉 pyramidal, and 〈𝑐 + 𝑎〉 pyramidal slip systems dominate room temperature compression along the normal direction (ND) at both quasi-static and high strain rate loading, which is not seen in high purity polycrystalline and single crystal Zr. In 〈𝑎〉 axis transverse direction (TD) deformation, 〈𝑎〉 prismatic and 〈𝑎〉 pyramidal slip systems are dominant. 〈𝑎〉 pyramidal and basal slip systems are more prevalent than currently reported in the literature, though this may be because 〈conventional analysis routes do not easily identify 〈𝑎〉 pyramidal slip. Basal slip systems are promoted, and 〈𝑎〉 prismatic slip is suppressed at a high strain rate (HR) compared to quasi-static strain rate (QS) loading. This is independent of loading axis texture (ND/TD).

== Applications ==
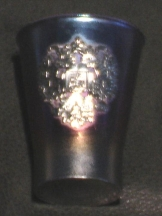
This Russian shot "glass" is made of zirconium alloy.

Zirconium alloys are corrosion resistant and biocompatible, and therefore can be used for body implants. In one particular application, a Zr-2.5Nb alloy is formed into a knee or hip implant and then oxidized to produce a hard ceramic surface for use in bearing against a polyethylene component. This oxidized zirconium alloy material provides the beneficial surface properties of a ceramic (reduced friction and increased abrasion resistance), while retaining the beneficial bulk properties of the underlying metal (manufacturability, fracture toughness, and ductility), providing a good solution for these medical implant applications.

Zr702 and Zr705 are zirconium alloys known for their high corrosion resistance. Zr702 is a commercially pure grade, widely used for its high corrosion resistance and low neutron absorption, particularly in nuclear and chemical industries. Zr705, alloyed with 2-3% niobium, shows enhanced strength and crack resistance and is used for high-stress applications such as demanding chemical processing environments, and medical implants.

Reduction of zirconium demand in Russia due to nuclear demilitarization after the end of the Cold War resulted in the exotic production of household zirconium items such as the vodka shot glass shown in the picture.

== See also ==
- Google books search results for the dedicated conference named "Zirconium in the nuclear industry"
- Construction of the Fukushima nuclear power plants
- Google books search results Stith, Tai. Science, Submarines & Secrets: The Incredible Early Years of the Albany Research Center. United States, Owl Room Press ISBN 9781735136646.
