= Post Irradiation Examination =

Study of used nuclear materials

Post Irradiation Examination (PIE) is the study of used nuclear materials such as nuclear fuel. It has several purposes. It is known that by examination of used fuel that the failure modes which occur during normal use (and the manner in which the fuel will behave during an accident) can be studied. In addition information is gained which enables the users of fuel to assure themselves of its quality and it also assists in the development of new fuels. After major accidents the core (or what is left of it) is normally subject to PIE in order to find out what happened. One site where PIE is done is the ITU which is the EU centre for the study of highly radioactive materials.

Materials in a high radiation environment (such as a reactor) can undergo unique behaviors such as swelling and non-thermal creep. If there are nuclear reactions within the material (such as what happens in the fuel), the stoichiometry will also change slowly over time. These behaviors can lead to new material properties, cracking, and fission gas release:

== Fission gas release ==
As the fuel is degraded or heated the more volatile fission products which are trapped within the uranium dioxide may become free.

== Fuel cracking ==
As the fuel expands on heating, the core of the pellet expands more than the rim which may lead to cracking. Because of the thermal stress thus formed the fuel cracks, the cracks tend to go from the centre to the edge in a star shaped pattern.

In order to better understand and control these changes in materials, these behaviors are studied. . Due to the intensely radioactive nature of the used fuel this is done in a hot cell. A combination of nondestructive and destructive methods of PIE are common.

In addition to the effects of radiation and the fission products on materials, scientists also need to consider the temperature of materials in a reactor, and in particular, the fuel. Too high fuel temperatures can compromise the fuel, and therefore it is important to control the temperature in order to control the fission chain reaction.

The temperature of the fuel varies as a function of the distance from the centre to the rim. At distance x from the centre the temperature (T_{x}) is described by the equation where ρ is the power density (W m^{−3}) and K_{f} is the thermal conductivity.

T_{x} = T_{Rim} + ρ (r_{pellet}^{2} - x^{2}) (4 K_{f})^{−1}

To explain this for a series of fuel pellets being used with a rim temperature of 200 °C (typical for a BWR) with different diameters and power densities of 250 Wm^{−3} have been modeled using the above equation. Note that these fuel pellets are rather large; it is normal to use oxide pellets which are about 10 mm in diameter.

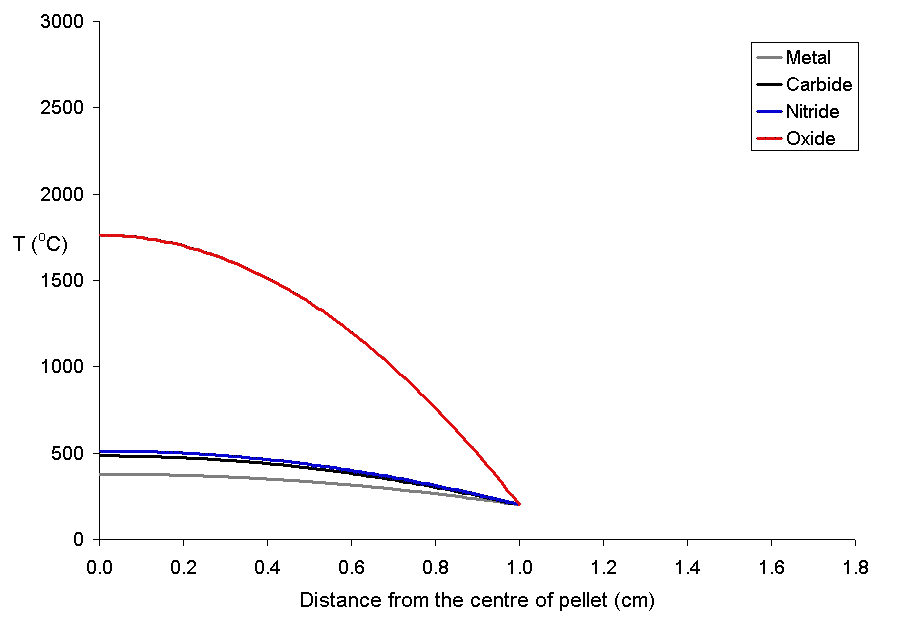
Temperature profile for a 20 mm diameter fuel pellet with a power density of 250 W per cubic meter. Note the central temperature is very different for the different fuel solids.

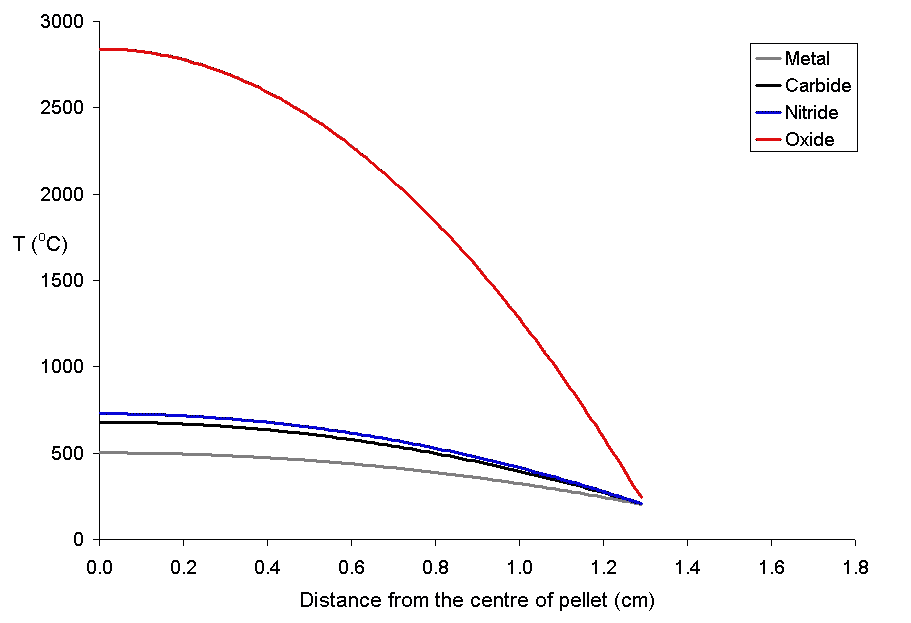
Temperature profile for a 26 mm diameter fuel pellet with a power density of 250 W per cubic meter

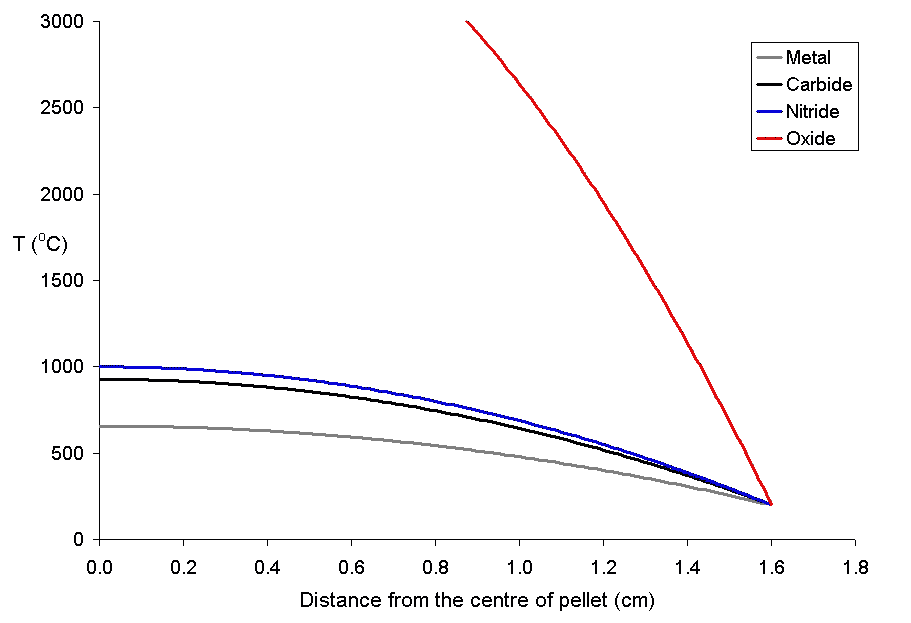
Temperature profile for a 32 mm diameter fuel pellet with a power density of 250 W per cubic meter

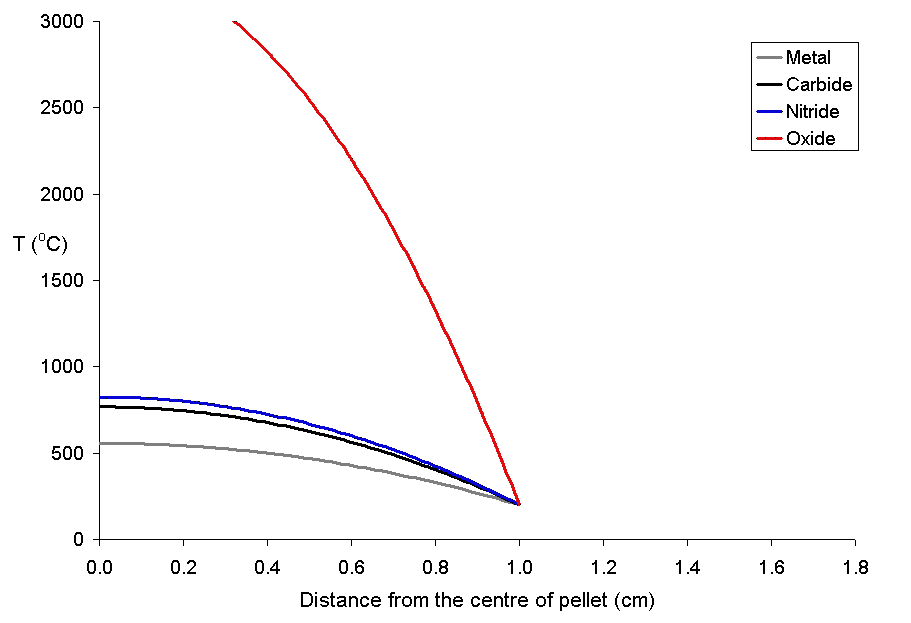
Temperature profile for a 20 mm diameter fuel pellet with a power density of 500 W per cubic meter. Because the melting point of uranium dioxide is about 3300 K, it is clear that uranium oxide fuel is overheating at the center.

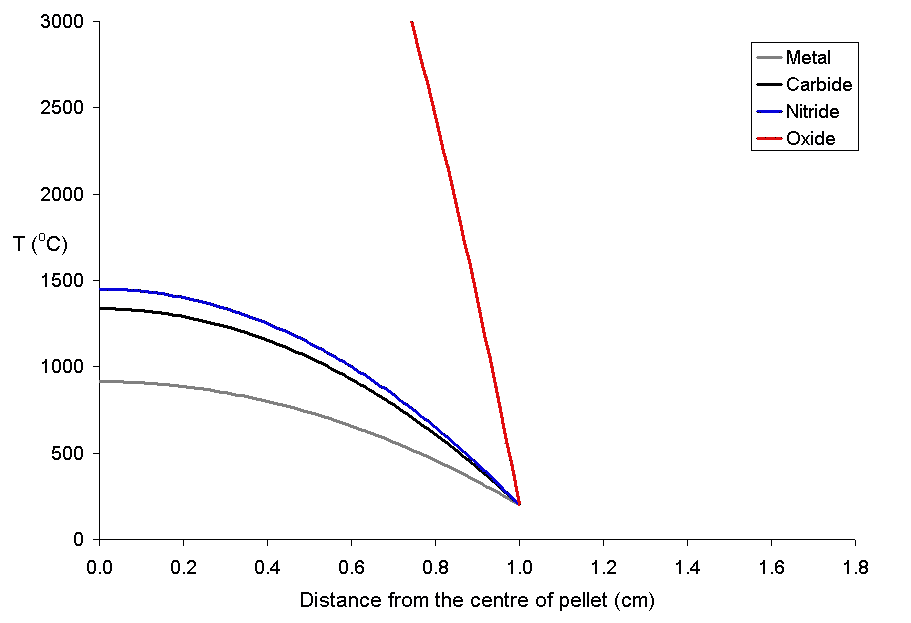
Temperature profile for a 20 mm diameter fuel pellet with a power density of 1000 W per cubic meter. The fuels other than uranium dioxide are not compromised.
