= Committee on the Safety of Nuclear Installations =

Committee of the OECD/NEA

The Committee on the Safety of Nuclear Installations is a committee of the OECD/NEA.

According to its web site (see below):

The mission of the Committee on the Safety of Nuclear Installations (CSNI) is to assist member countries in maintaining and further developing the scientific and technical knowledge base required to assess the safety of nuclear reactors and fuel cycle facilities. The Committee is made up of senior scientists and engineers, with broad responsibilities for safety technology and research programmes, and representatives from regulatory authorities.
