= Oxinium =

Oxinium is the brand name of a material used for replacement joints manufactured by the reconstructive orthopedic surgery division of medical devices company Smith & Nephew. It consists of a zirconium alloy metal substrate that transitions into a ceramic zirconium oxide outer surface.

The ceramic surface is extremely abrasion resistant compared to traditional metal implant materials such as cobalt chromium. It also has a lower coefficient of friction against ultra-high molecular weight polyethylene (UHMWPE), the typical counterface material used in total joint replacements. These two factors likely contribute to the significantly lower UHMWPE wear rates observed in simulator testing. Reducing UHMWPE wear is thought to decrease the risk of implant failure due to osteolysis. All-ceramic materials can have a similar effect on reducing wear, but are brittle and difficult to manufacture. The metal substrate of Oxinium implants makes components easier to manufacture and gives them greater toughness (a combination of strength and ductility). In essence, this technology combines the abrasion resistance and low friction of a ceramic with the workability and toughness of a metal.

This combination of properties led to Oxinium technology being the first ever implant-related technology to win the prestigious ASM International Engineering Materials Achievement Award (EMAA) in 2005.

Current competitive reduced-wear options in total hip arthroplasty (THA) are ceramic-on-ceramic, metal-on-metal, and metal-on-cross-linked polyethylene. The only competitive reduced-wear option for total knee arthroplasty (TKA) is metal-on-cross-linked polyethylene.

In September 2003, Smith & Nephew recalled its Macrotextured Oxinium Profix and Genesis II knee implants because of reports that 30 people receiving the implants without bone cement had to undergo a replacement surgery after they became loose.
