= Nuclear Safety Research Reactor =

The Nuclear Safety Research Reactor (NSRR) is a TRIGA design nuclear research reactor operated by the Japan Atomic Energy Agency.

- First criticality: June 1975

As of 2006, the reactor has performed 3033 pulses and 1280 Nuclear fuel experiments. In 1989 the reactor underwent a power uprate.
