= Auxiliary feedwater =

Backup feedwater system found in pressurized water reactors

Auxiliary feedwater is a backup water supply system found in pressurized water reactor nuclear power plants (PWRs). This system, sometimes known as emergency feedwater, is used during startup, shutdown, and certain accident conditions (for example, on loss of normal feedwater) to cool the reactor from operating temperatures until the residual heat removal system can be used. It works to indirectly remove decay heat from the reactor by pumping water to the steam generators from reserve tanks or a larger body of water (e.g. lake, river, or ocean) and dumping the resultant non-radioactive steam directly to the condenser or to atmosphere. A portion may also be used to drive turbine-driven auxiliary feedwater pump(s).

The auxiliary feedwater pumps in PWRs are generally some mix of motor-driven, diesel-driven, and turbine-driven to ensure redundancy. A turbine-driven auxiliary feedwater pump is powered by steam generated by the decay heat removal from the secondary side steam circuit of the plant. The typical steam turbine used in the auxiliary feedwater systems are the “solid wheel” or “water wheel” Terry Steam Turbines manufactured by the Curtiss-Wright Corporation in Summerville, SC.

In contrast to emergency core cooling systems for loss-of-coolant accidents, the auxiliary feedwater system does not inject directly into the reactor core. Instead, it cools in an indirect manner by cooling the primary circuit with the reactor via the steam generators.
