= Institute for Transuranium Elements =

German nuclear research institute

The Institute for Transuranium Elements (ITU) is a nuclear research institute in Karlsruhe, Germany. The ITU is one of the seven institutes of the Joint Research Centre, a Directorate-General of the European Commission. The ITU has about 300 staff. Its specialists have access to an extensive range of advanced facilities, many unavailable elsewhere in Europe.

== Mission statement ==
The Directorate General-Joint Research Centre is the European Commission's science and knowledge service. Its mission is to support EU policies with independent evidence throughout the whole policy cycle. Its work has a direct impact on the lives of citizens by contributing with its research outcomes to a healthy and safe environment, secure energy supplies, sustainable mobility and consumer health and safety. The JRC hosts specialist laboratories and unique research facilities and is home to thousands of scientists working to support EU policy. The JRC has ten Directorates and is located across five EU Member States (Belgium, Germany, Italy, the Netherlands and Spain).

The Directorate involved in this project is Directorate G – Nuclear Safety and Security within which the JRC's nuclear work programme, funded by the EURATOM Research and Training Programme, is carried out. It contributes to the scientific foundation for the protection of the European citizen against risks associated with the handling and storage of highly radioactive material, and scientific and technical support for the conception, development, implementation, and monitoring of community policies related to nuclear energy. Research and policy support activities of Directorate G contribute towards achieving effective safety and safeguards systems for the nuclear fuel cycle, to enhance nuclear security then contributing to achieving the goal of low carbon energy production.

The research programmes are carried out at the JRC sites in Germany (Karlsruhe), Belgium (Geel), The Netherlands (Petten) and Italy (Ispra) and consist of research, knowledge management and training activities on nuclear safety and security. They are performed in collaboration and/or in support to the EU Member States and relevant international organizations. Today the Directorate G is one of the leading nuclear research establishments for nuclear science and technology and a unique provider of nuclear data measurements. Typical research and policy support activities are experimental and modelling studies covering nuclear reactor and fuel cycle safety, including current and innovative nuclear energy systems. Fundamental properties, irradiation effects and behaviour under normal and accident conditions of nuclear fuels and structural materials are studied. The activities cover also studies of structural integrity and functioning of nuclear components, emergency preparedness and radioactivity environmental monitoring, nuclear waste management and decommissioning, as well as the study of non-energy technological and medical applications of radionuclides. A dedicated functional entity is devoted to the management and dissemination of knowledge and to facilitate open access to JRC nuclear facilities including training and education.

== Security ==
Normally, entry for visitors to the ITU was by prior invitation only for security reasons; a person wishing to enter the site as a visitor will be required to hand over their passport, before passing through a combined metal and radiation detector. The details of the devices used to test visitors for radioactive and nuclear materials are not public knowledge (for security reasons). Also on entry visitors are subject to a search by a security officer. All bags are examined using an x-ray machine similar to that used in an airport.

== Activities ==
The work of the ITU can be divided into a series of smaller activities.

=== Alpha-immunotherapy ===
A cancer treatment involving the production of antibodies bearing alpha particle-emitting radioisotopes which bind to cancer cells. The idea is to create a "magic bullet" which will seek and destroy cancer wherever it is hidden within the body. This treatment has reached clinical trials.

Bismuth-213 is one of the isotopes which has been used: this is made by the alpha decay of actinium-225, which in turn is made by the irradiation of radium-226 with a cyclotron.

=== Basic actinide research ===
Work has included the superconductivity and magnetic properties of actinides such as plutonium and americium.

=== Safety of nuclear fuel ===
The ITU is involved in a range of different areas of research on nuclear safety.

==== Accidents ====
The ITU's work includes the study of fuel behaviour during "out of control nuclear-reactor" conditions.

In the 2004 annual report from the ITU some results of the PIE on PHEBUS (FPT2) fuel are reported. PHEBUS is a series of experiments where fuel was overheated and damaged under very strictly controlled conditions, in order to obtain data on what would happen in a serious nuclear power reactor accident.

==== Waste forms ====
The long-term performance of waste and the systems designed to isolate it from "man and his environment" are studied here. For instance the corrosion of uranium dioxide is studied at the ITU.

=== Spent fuel characterisation ===
The ITU performs Post Irradiation Examination of spent nuclear fuel.

=== Partitioning and transmutation ===
Partitioning is the separation of nuclear wastes into different elements, see nuclear reprocessing for more details. The ITU is involved in both aqueous and pyro separation methods. They have published papers on the DIAMEX process.

See nuclear transmutation for details.

=== Measurement of radioactivity in the environment ===
The ITU is funded by the European Union, and theoretically has no "pro-" or "anti-nuclear" policy. The ITU is able to examine environmental samples in order to decide if dangerous levels of radioactive contamination are present. For instance, hot particles found on a beach in Scotland near Dounreay were examined at the ITU.

Much of this work is aimed at the measurement of very low levels of radioactivity; the ITU's analytical service uses inductively coupled plasma mass spectrometry to measure most radioactive isotopes with greater sensitivity than those possible with direct radiometric measurements.

=== Nuclear security and safeguards ===
The ITU has a service which assists police and other law enforcement organisations by examining any seized radioactive or nuclear material. Materials are analysed to discover what they are, where they come from, and what possible use they might have been.

=== Karlsruhe Nuclide Chart ===
The ITU manages the various versions and editions of the Karlsruhe Nuclide Chart.
