= Loss-of-coolant accident =

Form of nuclear reactor failure

A loss-of-coolant accident (LOCA) is a mode of failure for a nuclear reactor in which the coolant inventory or coolant flow that removes heat from the reactor core is partially or completely lost. If not managed effectively, a LOCA can result in damage to the reactor core. Each nuclear plant's emergency core cooling system (ECCS) exists specifically to deal with a LOCA, and LOCAs are analysed as design-basis accidents during reactor licensing.

== Background ==
Nuclear reactors generate heat internally; to remove this heat and convert it into useful electrical power, a coolant system is used. If this coolant flow is reduced, or lost altogether, the nuclear reactor's emergency shutdown system is designed to stop the fission chain reaction. However, due to radioactive decay, the nuclear fuel will continue to generate a significant amount of heat. The decay heat produced by a reactor shutdown from full power is initially equivalent to about 5 % to 6% of the thermal rating of the reactor.

If all of the independent cooling trains of the ECCS fail to operate as designed, this heat can increase the fuel temperature to the point of damaging the reactor:

- If water is present, it may boil, bursting out of its pipes. For this reason, nuclear power plants are equipped with pressure-operated relief valves and backup supplies of cooling water.
- If graphite and air are present, the graphite may catch fire, spreading radioactive contamination. This situation exists only in AGRs, RBMKs, Magnox and weapons-production reactors, which use graphite as a neutron moderator (see Chernobyl disaster and Windscale fire).
- The fuel and reactor internals may melt; if the melted configuration remains critical, the molten mass will continue to generate heat, possibly melting its way down through the bottom of the reactor. Such an event is called a nuclear meltdown and can have severe consequences. The so-called "China syndrome" would be this process taken to an extreme: the molten mass working its way down through the soil to the water table (and below) – however, current understanding and experience of nuclear fission reactions suggests that the molten mass would become too disrupted to carry on heat generation before descending very far; for example, in the Chernobyl disaster the reactor core melted and core material was found in lower levels, too widely dispersed to carry on a chain reaction (but still dangerously radioactive).

== Reactor response to coolant loss ==
Under operating conditions, a reactor may passively (that is, in the absence of any control systems) increase or decrease its power output in the event of a LOCA or of voids appearing in its coolant system (by water boiling, for example). This is measured by the coolant void coefficient. Most modern nuclear power plants have a negative void coefficient, indicating that as water turns to steam, power instantly decreases. Two exceptions are the Soviet RBMK and the Canadian CANDU. Boiling water reactors, on the other hand, are designed to have steam voids inside the reactor vessel.

Modern reactors are designed to prevent and withstand loss of coolant, regardless of their void coefficient, using various techniques:

- Some reactor designs have passive safety features that slow down or halt the chain reaction and remove decay heat without operator action or external power. The Pebble Bed Reactor, for instance, can withstand extreme temperature transients in its fuel. The CANDU reactor has two large masses of relatively cool, low-pressure water (first is the heavy-water moderator; second is the light-water-filled shield tank) that act as heat sinks. In the Hydrogen Moderated Self-regulating Nuclear Power Module, the chemical decomposition of the uranium hydride fuel halts the fission reaction by removing the hydrogen moderator. The same principle is used in TRIGA research reactors.
- Other designs rely on extensive active safety systems to rapidly shut down the chain reaction, and may additionally have passive safety systems (such as a large thermal heat sink around the reactor core, passively-activated backup cooling/condensing systems, or a passively cooled containment structure) that mitigate the risk of further damage.

== Progression after loss-of-coolant ==
A great deal of work goes into the prevention of a serious core event. If such an event were to occur, three different physical processes are expected to increase the time between the start of the accident and the time when a large release of radioactivity could occur. These three factors would provide additional time to the plant operators in order to mitigate the result of the event:

1. The time required for the water to boil away (coolant, moderator). Assuming that at the moment that the accident occurs the reactor will be SCRAMed (immediate and full insertion of all control rods), so reducing the thermal power input and further delaying the boiling.
2. The time required for the fuel to melt. After the water has boiled, then the time required for the fuel to reach its melting point will be dictated by the heat input due to decay of fission products, the heat capacity of the fuel and the melting point of the fuel.
3. The time required for the molten fuel to breach the primary pressure boundary. The time required for the molten metal of the core to breach the primary pressure boundary (in light water reactors this is the pressure vessel; in CANDU and RBMK reactors this is the array of pressurized fuel channels; in PHWR reactors like Atucha I, it will be a double barrier of channels and the pressure vessel) will depend on temperatures and boundary materials. Whether or not the fuel remains critical in the conditions inside the damaged core or beyond will play a significant role.

== Fuel claddings ==
Most reactors use a zirconium alloy as the material for fuel rod claddings due to its corrosion-resistance and low neutron absorption cross-section. However, one major drawback of zirconium alloys is that, when overheated, they oxidize and produce a runaway exothermic reaction with water (steam) that leads to the production of hydrogen: $\ce{Zr + 2H2O -> ZrO2 + 2H2}$. Such reactions are what led to the hydrogen explosions in the Fukushima Daiichi nuclear disaster. Hydrogen absorbed by the cladding during normal reactor operation also degrades the mechanical properties of zirconium alloys through hydride-induced embrittlement, which can further influence cladding behaviour under accident conditions.

=== Rupture behaviour ===
The residual decay heat causes rapid increase in temperature and internal pressure of the fuel cladding which leads to plastic deformation and subsequent bursting. During a loss-of-coolant accident, zirconium-based fuel claddings undergo high temperature oxidation, phase transformation, and creep deformation simultaneously. These mechanisms have been extensively studied by researchers using burst criterion models. In one study, researchers developed a burst criterion for Zircaloy-4 fuel claddings and determined that the effect of the steam environment on failure of the claddings is negligible at low temperatures. However, as the burst temperature increases, rapid oxidation of Zircaloy-4 claddings occurs leading to a sharp decrease in its ductility. In fact, at higher temperatures the burst strain essentially drops to zero, signifying that the oxidized cladding becomes so brittle locally that it is predicted to fail without any further deformation or straining.

The amount of oxygen picked up by the zirconium alloy depends on the exposure time to steam (H_{2}O) before rupture. For rapid ruptures due to high heating rates and internal pressures, there is negligible oxidation. However, oxidation plays an important role in fracture for low heating rates and low initial internal pressures.

=== Oxidation-resistant coatings ===
The zirconium alloy substrates can be coated to improve their oxidation resistance. In one study, researchers coated a Zirlo substrate with Ti_{2}AlC MAX phase using a hybrid arc/magnetron sputtering technique followed by an annealing treatment. They subsequently investigated the mechanical properties and oxidation resistance in pure steam conditions at 1000 °C, 1100 °C, and 1200 °C under different oxidation times. Results showed that coating the Zirlo substrate with Ti_{2}AlC caused an increase in hardness and elastic modulus compared to the bare substrate. Additionally, the high-temperature oxidation resistance was significantly improved. The benefits of Ti_{2}AlC over other coating materials are that it has excellent stability under neutron irradiation, a lower thermal expansion coefficient, better thermal shock resistance, and higher temperature oxidation resistance. Table 1 provides a good indication of the improved mechanical properties as a result of the coating and improved resistance to plastic deformation.

Table 1. Mechanical properties of substrate and coated material
	Hardness (GPa)	Elastic Modulus (GPa)	H/E	H^{3}/E^{2} (GPa)
Substrate	5.39 ± 0.1	129.92 ± 3.1	0.04	0.01
Ti_{2}AlC coated material	14.24±0.1	230.8±3.1	0.06	0.05

Another recent study evaluated Cr and FeCrAl coatings (deposited on Zircaloy-4 using atmospheric plasma spraying technology) under simulated loss-of-coolant conditions. The Cr coating displayed superior oxidation resistance. The formation of a compact Cr_{2}O_{3} layer on the Cr-coating acted as an oxygen diffusion barrier that protected the Zr substrate from oxidation whereas the FeCrAl coating degraded due to inter-diffusion between the coating and the Zr substrate at high temperature thereby allowing Zr to still oxidize.

== Small modular reactors ==
Small modular reactors (SMRs) are designed with smaller core inventories and lower decay heat loads than conventional large reactors, and many designs rely on passive safety systems rather than active, externally powered equipment to cope with a loss-of-coolant accident. In integral pressurized water reactor SMR designs, the primary circuit components (steam generators and pressurizer) are housed within the reactor pressure vessel itself, eliminating the large-diameter external primary coolant piping whose rupture constitutes the classical large-break LOCA in conventional plants. As a result, only smaller LOCA scenarios remain credible, and their progression differs from that in large pressurized water reactors.

The NuScale design, the first SMR to be certified by the U.S. Nuclear Regulatory Commission, illustrates this approach: each reactor module is enclosed in a steel containment vessel immersed in a large below-grade water pool that serves as the ultimate heat sink. On a LOCA signal, the fully passive emergency core cooling system opens reactor vent valves and recirculation valves; steam released from the pressure vessel condenses on the containment walls and is returned to the core by natural circulation, allowing decay heat removal for an extended period without external power, additional water, or operator action. Other SMR concepts adopt similar strategies, such as passive residual heat removal systems that reject decay heat to emergency cooldown tanks by natural circulation.

== Notable accidents ==
=== Three Mile Island ===
The 1979 Three Mile Island accident in the United States was a small-break loss-of-coolant accident: a pilot-operated relief valve on the pressurizer stuck open after a reactor trip, allowing primary coolant to escape unnoticed. Misled instrumentation caused operators to throttle emergency injection, and the resulting loss of core cooling led to a partial meltdown of the Unit 2 reactor core.

=== Fukushima Daiichi ===
The Fukushima Daiichi nuclear disaster in 2011 occurred due to a loss-of-coolant accident. The circuits that provided electrical power to the coolant pumps failed causing a loss-of-core-cooling that was critical for the removal of residual decay heat which is produced even after active reactors are shut down and nuclear fission has ceased. The loss of reactor core cooling led to three nuclear meltdowns, three hydrogen explosions and the release of radioactive contamination.

The hydrogen explosions can be directly attributed to the oxidation of zirconium by steam in the fuel claddings as a result of the loss-of-coolant.

== See also ==
- LOFT (LOCA)
- Containment building
- Nuclear power
- Pressurized water reactor
- Small modular reactor
- Nuclear fuel response to reactor accidents
- Nuclear accidents in the United States
- Nuclear safety in the U.S.
- Nuclear meltdown
- Lucens reactor
