= Nine Mile Point Nuclear Generating Station =

Nuclear power plant located in Scriba, Oswego County, New York

Nine Mile Point Clean Energy Center
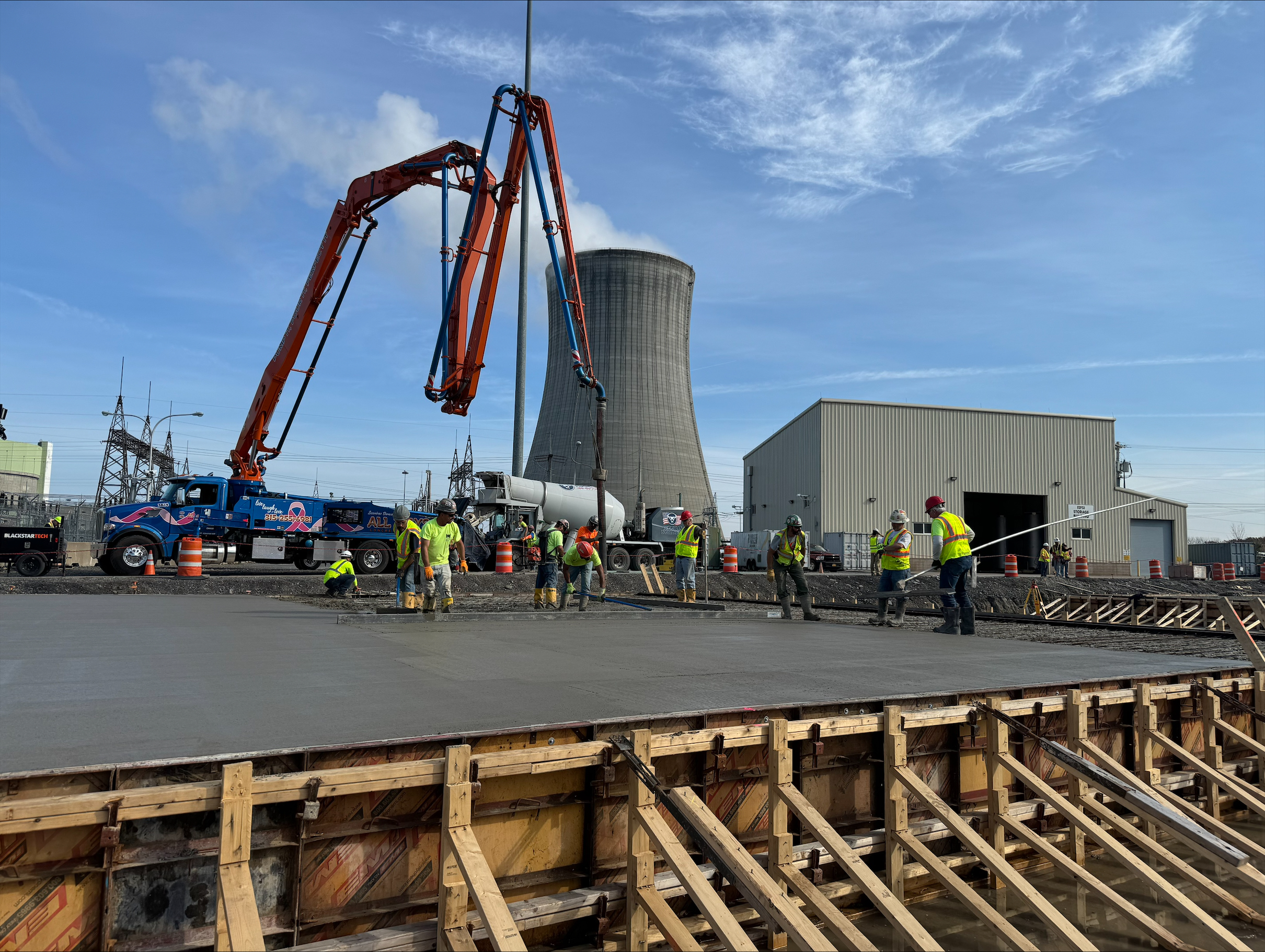
- The Nine Mile Point Clean Energy Center ISFSI pad construction
- Country: United States
- Location: Scriba, Oswego County, New York; near Oswego, New York
- Coordinates: 43°31′15″N 76°24′25″W
- Status: Operational
- Construction began: Unit 1: April 12, 1965; Unit 2: August 1, 1975
- Commission date: Unit 1: December 1, 1969; Unit 2: March 11, 1988
- Construction cost: Unit 1: $804.7 million (2007 USD); Unit 2: $8.529 billion (2007 USD)
- Owners: Constellation Energy, Long Island Power Authority
- Operator: Constellation Energy

Nuclear power station
- Reactor type: BWR
- Reactor supplier: General Electric
- Cooling towers: 1 × Natural Draft (Unit 2)
- Cooling source: Lake Ontario
- Thermal capacity: 1 × 1850 MW_{th} 1 × 3988 MW_{th}

Power generation
- Units operational: 1 × 644 MW; 1 × 1375 MW
- Make and model: Unit 1: BWR-2 (Mark 1); Unit 2: BWR-5 (Mark 2)
- Units cancelled: 1 × 1600 MW US EPR
- Nameplate capacity: 2019 MW
- Capacity factor: 96.69% (2017); 78.9% (lifetime)
- Annual net output: 16,206 GWh (2021)

External links
- Website: Nine Mile Point
- Commons: Related media on Commons

Nine Mile Point Clean Energy Center (formerly known as the Nine Mile Point Nuclear Station) is a nuclear power plant with two nuclear reactors located in the town of Scriba, approximately five miles northeast of Oswego, New York, on the shore of Lake Ontario. The 900-acre (360 ha) site is also occupied by the James A. FitzPatrick Nuclear Power Plant.

In April 2011, Exelon of Chicago announced its intention to purchase Constellation Energy, the owner and operator of Nine Mile Point Nuclear Station. The acquisition was approved by FERC and the companies officially combined on March 12, 2012, with Constellation Energy taking the Exelon name. Exelon separated its generating assets back into Constellation Energy in 2022. Constellation owns Unit 1 and holds 82% of Unit 2 while Long Island Power Authority holds 18%. Constellation Energy is the sole operator of both Units 1 and 2. Both units are boiling water reactors (BWRs).

== Units 1 and 2 ==
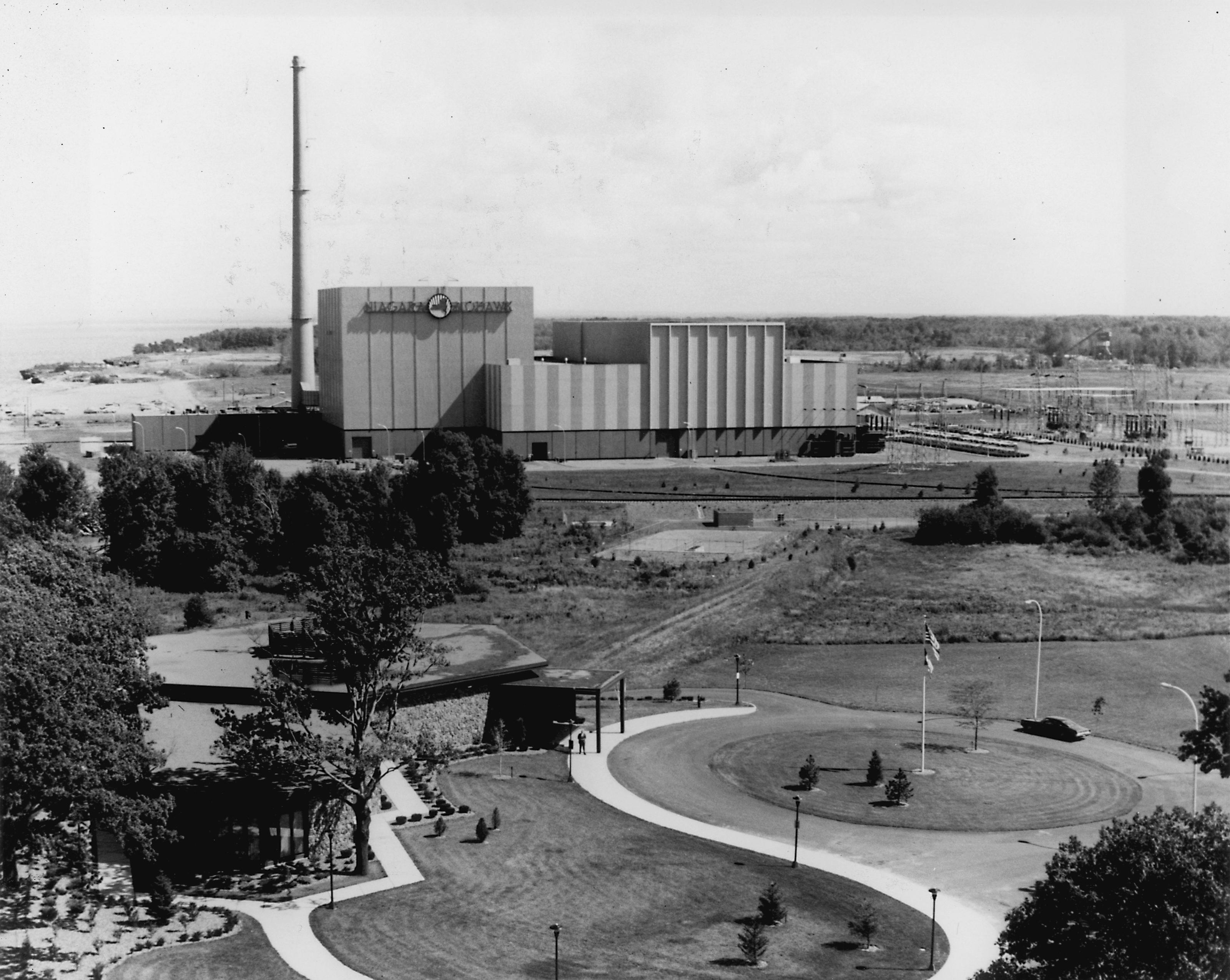
Unit 1 of Nine Mile Point Nuclear Generating Station c. 1969

Both units are General Electric boiling water reactors (BWR). Unit 1, a BWR-2 (Generation 2), went online in 1969 and has a rated capacity of 644 megawatts (864,000 hp). It is the oldest operating commercial nuclear reactor still in service in the United States. Unit 2, a BWR-5, has been in operation since 1988 and has a rated capacity of 1,375 MW. Construction of both units, along with neighboring Fitzpatrick, was commissioned by Niagara Mohawk Power Corporation. Fitzpatrick was sold immediately upon completion, while Niagara Mohawk retained its share of the Nine Mile Point units until 2001, when it sold them to Constellation.

On October 31, 2006, Constellation announced that the NRC had granted 20-year license extensions to both units. Unit 1 is now licensed to operate until 2029, and Unit 2 is licensed until 2046. Unit 1 has applied for a 20-year license extension for operation until 2049.

The Nine Mile Point 2 cooling tower is 543 feet tall and is visible from Chimney Bluffs in Sodus, New York nearly 30 miles away. Nine Mile Point 1 draws cooling water from Lake Ontario, and does not have a cooling tower.

In early May 2011, the plant operator reported that the plant fuel supplier, General Electric, notified the operator that mathematical errors could've resulted in the reactor's fuel getting hotter than expected.

In 2016, Governor of New York Andrew Cuomo directed the Public Service Commission to consider ratepayer-financed subsidies similar to those for renewable sources to keep nuclear power stations profitable in the competition against natural gas. Indian Point would not be included in the scheme.

== Withdrawn unit 3 proposal ==
Unistar Nuclear, a joint venture between Constellation Energy and Électricité de France (EDF), announced in late 2008 that it had notified the U.S. Nuclear Regulatory Commission (NRC) of its plan to submit a combined construction and operating license (COL) application for a European Pressurized Reactor (EPR) at Constellation Energy's Nine Mile Point site. Less than a year later however, Unistar requested a temporary suspension of the application review, and in 2013, citing a lack of federal loan guarantees, withdrew the application completely.

== Electricity production ==
Generation (MWh) of Nine Mile Point Nuclear Generating Station
Year	Jan	Feb	Mar	Apr	May	Jun	Jul	Aug	Sep	Oct	Nov	Dec	Annual (total)
2001	1,309,751	1,082,371	996,634	792,703	839,639	1,213,015	1,042,234	1,165,283	1,233,386	1,197,046	1,259,445	1,098,455	13,229,962
2002	1,301,564	1,183,386	857,629	772,513	1,226,472	1,250,520	1,272,099	1,255,248	1,243,747	1,260,796	888,453	730,464	13,242,891
2003	1,318,106	1,086,660	1,037,882	838,868	1,219,947	1,226,521	1,068,496	1,016,544	1,244,842	1,288,636	1,221,228	1,298,812	13,866,542
2004	1,132,313	1,174,594	791,970	495,639	1,249,267	1,236,082	1,282,314	1,248,743	1,163,039	1,268,515	1,271,877	1,287,183	13,601,536
2005	1,317,483	1,188,926	1,101,125	826,387	1,214,595	1,232,033	1,264,159	1,237,864	1,235,761	1,303,254	1,271,780	1,314,381	14,507,748
2006	1,311,929	1,157,117	845,319	884,828	1,305,932	1,181,231	1,278,746	1,279,037	1,253,733	1,302,056	1,268,169	1,316,237	14,384,334
2007	1,317,419	1,153,677	826,238	1,032,859	1,218,774	1,246,426	1,276,739	1,244,518	1,208,667	1,291,728	847,849	1,299,130	13,964,024
2008	1,316,569	1,225,699	1,037,712	787,827	1,297,804	1,237,640	1,268,441	1,279,355	1,243,369	1,232,911	1,150,627	1,309,769	14,387,723
2009	1,316,673	1,169,505	1,129,488	1,083,746	1,309,346	1,255,222	1,286,215	1,277,742	1,249,653	1,253,744	1,268,150	1,315,012	14,914,496
2010	1,185,280	1,167,767	1,312,218	494,373	1,189,133	1,243,776	1,279,385	1,285,670	1,249,015	1,298,050	1,214,643	1,319,743	14,239,053
2011	1,310,649	1,178,658	1,120,852	941,175	1,048,935	1,258,797	1,275,745	1,093,570	1,247,499	1,305,602	1,272,676	1,101,461	14,155,619
2012	1,316,184	1,130,245	1,304,973	658,199	461,139	881,195	1,154,809	1,387,521	1,275,120	1,351,902	961,481	1,282,495	13,165,263
2013	1,435,237	1,289,866	1,433,301	1,131,870	1,163,963	1,368,731	1,344,741	1,396,820	1,358,815	1,415,931	1,327,719	1,179,339	15,846,333
2014	1,415,857	1,288,293	959,694	486,946	1,360,306	1,344,023	1,402,344	1,398,963	1,347,028	1,420,433	1,386,105	1,429,188	15,239,180
2015	1,432,717	1,123,379	1,166,683	1,194,851	1,410,404	1,366,225	1,396,404	1,387,647	1,284,343	1,427,155	1,386,181	1,422,087	15,998,076
2016	1,434,258	1,339,141	1,426,035	754,831	1,245,904	1,362,014	1,390,660	1,388,618	1,356,487	1,410,925	1,152,424	1,239,075	15,500,372
2017	1,387,866	1,212,679	1,171,443	1,296,298	1,419,287	1,361,709	1,365,672	1,269,240	1,313,158	1,408,117	1,361,625	1,425,786	15,992,880
2018	1,425,422	1,284,109	1,364,805	888,698	900,404	1,290,409	1,386,302	1,295,057	1,345,935	1,407,026	1,374,831	1,419,832	15,382,830
2019	1,423,364	1,257,891	1,149,066	926,790	1,328,362	1,364,304	1,388,799	1,388,538	1,436,064	1,370,496	1,368,169	1,419,533	15,821,376
2020	1,428,083	1,283,107	567,783	1,223,820	1,423,323	1,361,161	1,383,881	1,384,509	1,356,053	1,415,070	1,382,224	1,431,594	15,640,608
2021	1,433,988	1,274,512	1,256,094	1,201,383	1,411,935	1,352,044	1,393,758	1,373,978	1,353,074	1,387,225	1,354,343	1,414,058	16,206,392
2022	1,410,894	1,186,409	701,970	1,224,682	1,399,041	1,345,947	1,375,176	1,367,515	951,058	1,406,944	1,370,138	1,421,057	15,790,831
2023	1,404,444	1,223,276	1,081,005	1,044,150	1,402,944	1,348,818	1,366,713	1,376,229	1,143,531	1,375,447	1,347,764	1,392,580	15,506,901
2024	1,395,521	1,299,025	655,002	1,367,327	1,404,158	1,347,168	1,376,491	1,381,349	1,180,294	1,397,757	1,313,474	1,366,977	15,484,543
2025	1,357,778	1,219,753	1,127,879	1,272,962	1,411,556	1,354,710	1,377,474	1,387,483	1,344,091	1,387,697	1,305,680	1,416,513	15,963,576
2026	1,414,872	1,234,620	663,620	1,268,198	1,409,230	1,350,030	1,376,789	1,371,583					--

== Surrounding population ==
The Nuclear Regulatory Commission defines two emergency planning zones around nuclear power plants: a plume exposure pathway zone with a radius of 10 miles (16 km), concerned primarily with exposure to, and inhalation of, airborne radioactive contamination, and an ingestion pathway zone of about 50 miles (80 km), concerned primarily with ingestion of food and liquid contaminated by radioactivity.

The 2010 U.S. population within 10 miles (16 km) of Nine Mile Point was 35,632, an increase of 17.0 percent in a decade, according to an analysis of U.S. Census data for msnbc.com. The 2010 U.S. population within 50 miles (80 km) was 909,523, an increase of 3.2 percent since 2000. Cities within 50 miles include Syracuse (36 miles to city center).

== 1991 site area emergency ==
On August 13, 1991, a "site area emergency" was declared at the plant. According to Time magazine, this was the third occasion an SAE had been declared at a US nuclear plant.

The emergency was due to an electrical fault which caused a momentary loss of electrical power to the reactor and control room. The operators shut down the reactor in accordance with the emergency plan requirements. There were no injuries or release of radiation as a result of the incident. The reactor left emergency procedures about 13 hours after initiation.

From NRC Information Notice 91-64, Supplement 1:

The facility was operating at full power when a phase-to-ground electrical fault occurred on phase B of the Unit 2 main power transformer. This resulted in a trip of the main generator, main turbine, and reactor. The fault also caused the voltage on electrical distribution phase B buses to drop to about half of its nominal value for approximately 200 milliseconds, after which it returned to normal.

This momentary voltage drop resulted in the simultaneous loss of power output from each of the five Non-Class 1E uninterruptible power supplies. Exide's UPS units have internal continuously charged back-up batteries to prevent a loss of control logic power. Exide's UPS control logic circuitry receives, processes, generates, and sends electrical signals essential for proper UPS operation. However, in this incident the back-up power battery packs were apparently past their useful life and were completely discharged.

The loss of power from the UPS units caused a loss of all the following: the control room annunciators, the safety parameter display system computer, control rod position indication, the plant process computer, the core thermal limits computer, the feedwater control system, some of the lighting for the plant, the plant radio and paging systems, some instrumentation for balance-of-plant systems, and some instrument recorders.

The loss of control room annunciators concurrent with the plant transient resulting from automatic tripping of the main generator, main turbine, and reactor caused the licensee (Niagara Mohawk) to declare a site area emergency in accordance with the site emergency plan. The loss of control rod position indicators and other equipment losses burdened the operators in implementing the emergency procedures. However, the operators shut down the plant in accordance with emergency procedures. About 13 hours after the plant trip, the reactor was placed in a cold shutdown condition; and approximately 1 hour later, the licensee ended the site area emergency.

== Seismic risk ==
The Nuclear Regulatory Commission's estimate of the risk each year of an earthquake intense enough to cause core damage to the reactor at Nine Mile Point was Reactor 1: 1 in 238,095; Reactor 2: 1 in 178,571, according to an NRC study published in August 2010.

== See also ==
- Darlington Nuclear Generating Station—located on the opposite side of Lake Ontario
- New York energy law
- Nuclear Power 2010 Program
- Pickering Nuclear Generating Station—located on the opposite side of Lake Ontario
- R. E. Ginna Nuclear Power Plant—located 50 miles west on Lake Ontario near Rochester
