= GE Vernova Hitachi Nuclear Energy =

American nuclear technology company

- Type: Joint venture
- Industry: Nuclear power
- Founded: June 2007; 19 years ago
- Headquarters: Wilmington, North Carolina, U.S.
- Area served: Worldwide
- Key people: Jason Cooper (president & CEO)
- Owner: GE Vernova; Hitachi
- Number of employees: 3,000
- Website: gevernova.com/nuclear

GE Vernova Hitachi Nuclear Energy (GVH), formerly GE Hitachi Nuclear Energy (GEH), is a provider of advanced reactors and nuclear services. It is headquartered in Wilmington, North Carolina, United States. Established in June 2007, GVH is a nuclear alliance created by General Electric and Hitachi. In Japan, the alliance is called Hitachi-GE Nuclear Energy.

== History ==
In 1955, the Atomic Power Equipment Department was established by GE. Two years later, in 1957, GE's first privately financed nuclear power reactor provided electricity for commercial use in Vallecitos, California. Additionally, in 1960, GE made and contributed to the Dresden Nuclear Power Station in Chicago. In the 1960s, it got involved in constructing and building the first boiling water reactor (BWR). The research into the project continued for the next 50 years resulting in the production of 6 different generations of BWRs. In 1997, the GE-Hitachi U.S. advanced boiling water reactor (ABWR) design was certified as a final design in final form by the U.S. Nuclear Regulatory Commission.

GE and Hitachi officially established the GE Hitachi Nuclear Energy (GEH) global alliance in 2007 by combining parts of their respective power businesses. Based in Wilmington, North Carolina, its main business was providing advanced reactor technology, fuel and nuclear services. It operated training facilities in Wilmington and San Jose, California, and fuel manufacturing operations in Wilmington and Kurihama, Japan. In Canada, the organization was known as GE Hitachi Nuclear Energy Canada. It provided fuel and serviced nuclear power plants that operate on heavy water reactors made by Atomic Energy Canada. In 2016, GE and Hitachi sold GE Hitachi Nuclear Energy Canada to BWXT Canada Ltd., and it was renamed BWXT Nuclear Energy Canada.

In 2005, GE Hitachi filed a design certification by the USNRC for their Economic Simplified Boiling Water Reactor (ESBWR). The ESBWR received a positive Safety Evaluation Report and Final Design Approval on March 9, 2011. On June 7, 2011, the USNRC completed its public comment period. Final rule was issued on September 16, 2014, after two outstanding problems with GE-Hitachi's modeling of loads on the steam dryer were solved. In 2013, following its purchase of Horizon Nuclear Power, Hitachi began the process of generic design assessment of the Hitachi-GE ABWR with the UK Office for Nuclear Regulation. The process was completed in December 2017.

In January 2020, the company started the regulatory licensing process for the BWRX-300 with the USNRC, and in 2023 it had begun the licensing process for the BWRX-300 in the UK.

== Projects ==
In 2022, SaskPower announced that it had selected the BWRX-300 for potential use in Saskatchewan, Canada, aiming for deployment in the mid-2030s, and ORLEN Synthos Green Energy (OSGE) began the pre-licensing process for the reactor in Poland.

In 2023, GVH signed a contract with Ontario Power Generation, SNC-Lavalin, and Aecon to deploy a BWRX-300 small modular reactor (SMR) at OPG's Darlington New Nuclear Project site, the first contract for a North American grid-scale SMR. Also in 2023 the Ontario provincial government announced it would plan for four SMRs at the Darlington site and OPG selected nuclear fuel suppliers for the Darlington New Nuclear Project. If GVH ultimately deploys four reactors at Darlington, it will have total capacity of 1,200 MWe.

In April 2025 the CNSC issued a license to construct one BWRX-300 reactor, in May 2025 the Ontario province granted approval for construction and in April 2026 construction began. The total budget for four reactors is set at CAD$20.9 billion, with the first reactor estimated to cost CAD$6.1 billion and services and systems shared between the four reactors to cost CAD$1.6 billion. The Ontario province said that to replace the four SMRs would require building up to 8,900 MW of wind and solar paired with battery storage. The province of Ontario has invested CAD$1 billion in the Darlington New Nuclear Project through the Building Ontario fund and the federal government has invested CAD$2 billion through the Canada Growth Fund.

To support the development of the BWRX-300 SMR, GVH has signed memoranda of understanding with companies in Canada, Poland, UK, US, and Sweden, among others.

In 2023, the Tennessee Valley Authority (TVA) began the process of preliminary licensing of a BWRX-300 in collaboration with Ontario Power Generation (OPG), and the U.S. Nuclear Regulatory Commission (USNRC) and Canadian Nuclear Safety Commission likewise collaborated to support both projects. In May 2025 TVA submitted a construction application to deploy a BWRX-300 reactor at its Clinch River site near Oak Ridge, Tennessee. In December 2025 the U.S. Department of Energy awarded $400 million to TVA to support deployment of the BWRX-300.

The BWRX-300 was shortlisted for potential deployment in Sweden by state-owned Swedish utility Vattenfall in 2024, but in June 2026 Vattenfall selected Rolls-Royce SMR as the ultimate winner.

In May 2026 nuclear developer Blue Energy announced plans to pair 1.5 GW of BWRX-300 reactors with 1 GW of GE Vernova natural gas turbines and deploy them at a site in Texas, with a final investment decision to come in 2027. Blue Energy plans to apply for a construction permit in 2027 and expects the BWRX-300s to come online as early as 2032 and power a nearby data center campus.

In June 2026 nuclear developer Elementl announced plans to deploy 1.5 GW of BWRX-300 reactors in southeast Ohio on a Meigs County site Elementl has agreed to purchase from American Municipal Power. Elementl plans to finance the plant itself, with construction expected to begin in 2030 and completion in 2034.

In July 2026 European nuclear developer SGE announced plans to build 15 BWRX-300 reactors at three sites in the UK, with a deployment team that includes Samsung C&T, Aecon Group and Fermi Development.

SGE is a subsidiary of Polish chemical manufacturing company Synthos and is specifically focused on deploying the BWRX-300 in Europe. Orlen Synthos Green Energy, a joint venture of SGE and Orlen, in June 2026 applied to the Polish energy ministry for a contract for difference for 14 BWRX-300s it plans to deploy in Poland. OSGE eventually plans to deploy 26 BWRX-300s in Poland. SGE also plans to deploy four BWRX-300s in Lithuania, ten in Hungary and six in Bulgaria.

Estonia's Fermi Energia has also selected the BWRX-300 to deploy in Estonia by the early 2030s.

== Reactors ==
The Advanced Boiling Water Reactor (ABWR) is the world's first operational Generation III Class advanced light water reactor design. The USNRC has registered GVH's petition for renewal of ABWR certification. The Economic Simplified Boiling Water Reactor (ESBWR), the Generation III+ Class design reactor, received a positive final safety evaluation report and final design approval in March 2011, and is expected to receive a license from the USNRC by September 2011. The USNRC granted design approval in September 2014.

GVH's Power Reactor Innovative Small Modular (PRISM) is a Generation IV reactor that uses liquid sodium as a coolant. In 2020 GVH partnered with TerraPower to develop a natrium reactor.

In 2018, GVH agreed to collaborate with Holtec International on the commercialization of the Holtec SMR-160, a 160 MWe pressurized water reactor (PWR) small modular reactor.

GVH's BWRX-300 design is a 300 megawatt electric, 870 megawatt thermal boiling water reactor design which is intended to simplify the ESBWR design and uses low-enriched uranium fuel. The BWRX-300 capital cost is estimated at $2,250 per kilowatt electric for series production and an operation and maintenance costs are estimated at $16/MWh.

== Nuclear services ==
GVH offers services for adapting plant performance and power output as well as maintenance for extending plant life as nuclear plants get older and worldwide demand for energy increases. It also offers nuclear power services in many other areas, including outage services, general plant upgrades, inspections, and virtual reality training simulators.

Boiling water reactors

GE and Hitachi have both developed boiling water reactors for over 60 years, with 40 reactors currently operating in 5 countries. BWRs and pressurized water reactors (PWRs) both use light water as a coolant and steam source, but BWRs generate steam directly in the reactor core, while PWRs use a secondary loop to produce steam.

Sodium fast reactors

As a successor to the nuclear energy legacy of GE and Hitachi, GVH has over 70 years of experience in developing sodium-cooled fast reactors (SFRs), offering greater fuel efficiency (4x) and higher electricity output (100x) than light water reactors (LWRs). SFRs help address the challenge of spent nuclear fuel by recycling uranium and transuranics, generating additional electricity while reducing long-term radiotoxicity.

BWRX-300 small modular reactor

GVH has over 60 years of experience in designing, deploying, and servicing nuclear reactors, with 67 reactors licensed in 10 countries. They have produced over 165,000 BWR fuel bundles and hold over 6,660 patents.

== Fuel manufacturing sites ==
GVH’s fuel cycle business supplies fuel products and services to customers around the world. GE Vernova Hitachi Nuclear Energy owns the Morris Operation—the only de facto high-level radioactive waste storage site in the United States.

Wilmington (North Carolina, USA)

The site was dedicated in 1969, and is also the location of GVH's global headquarters. It takes up more than 1,500 acres, and produces zirconium-alloy components, uranium dioxide powder and pellets, and fuel assemblies for the boiling water reactor market.

Kurihama (Yokosuka City, Kanagawa Prefecture, Japan)

Established in 1970, this site has provided Japanese consumers with nuclear energy. Originally built on rural farmland, the Kurihama site has developed into an industrial community, with the power plant becoming an important part of the economy in the Kanagawa region.

== Outreach in North Carolina ==
In 2022, GE Hitachi Nuclear Energy announced plans to expand its Wilmington operations, aiming to create roughly 500 new jobs over the next five years to support the deployment of its modular reactor, the BWRX-300. These reactors are planned to be installed around the world, including the U.K., Poland, Sweden, Czech Republic, Estonia, and Canada. GEH had already hired around 250 employees at the time of its announcement and expected these jobs to significantly impact the North Carolina economy while helping to meet climate goals.

== See also ==
- Horizon Nuclear Power
