= River Bend Nuclear Generating Station =

Nuclear power plant in Louisiana, United States

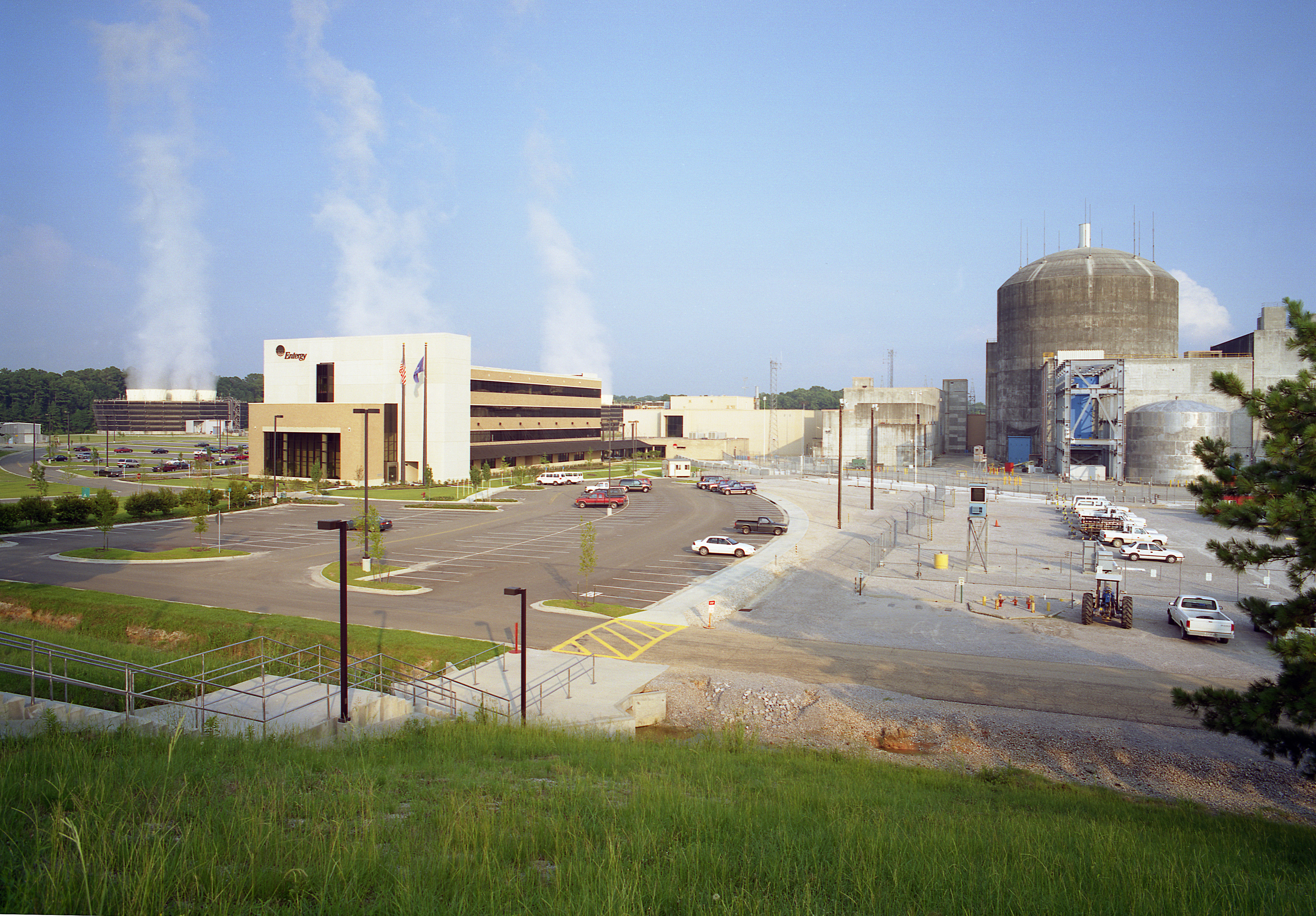
- Official name: River Bend Nuclear Station
- Country: United States
- Location: West Feliciana Parish, near St. Francisville, Louisiana
- Coordinates: 30°45.4′N 91°20′W
- Status: Operational
- Construction began: March 25, 1977
- Commission date: June 16, 1986
- Construction cost: $7.198 billion (2007 USD)
- Owner: Entergy Gulf States
- Operator: Entergy Nuclear

Nuclear power station
- Reactor type: BWR
- Reactor supplier: General Electric
- Cooling towers: 4 × Mechanical Draft (Note: 4 × concentric low-profile concrete cooling towers, each with 8 × individual induced-draft cooling cells, for a total of 32 induced-draft cooling cells.)
- Cooling source: Mississippi River
- Thermal capacity: 1 × 3091 MW_{th}

Power generation
- Units operational: 1 × 974 MW
- Make and model: BWR-6 (Mark 3 Containment)
- Units cancelled: 1 × 934 MW; 1 × 1520 MW ESBWR
- Nameplate capacity: 974 MW
- Capacity factor: 87.02% (2021); 81.90% (lifetime)
- Annual net output: 7441 GWh (2021)

External links
- Website: River Bend Nuclear Station
- Commons: Related media on Commons

River Bend Nuclear Generating Station is a nuclear power station on a 3,300-acre (1,300 ha) site near St. Francisville, Louisiana in West Feliciana Parish, approximately 30 miles (50 km) north of Baton Rouge. The station has one sixth generation General Electric boiling water reactor that has a nominal gross electric output of about 1010 MW_{e}. Commercial operation began on June 16, 1986. In 2003, owners applied and were approved for a power upgrade of approximately 52 megawatts in 2003. The nameplate capacity is 974 MW.

River Bend is operated by Entergy, which owns 100% of the station through its subsidiary, Entergy Gulf States Louisiana. The plant's operating license will expire in 2045.

The Site Vice President is Phil Hansett, the General Manager of Plant Operations is Rob Melton, and the Senior Operations Manager is Danny James. The station employs 870 full time employees.

== Units 2 and 3 ==
The River Bend site was originally designed to have two identical units. Construction on Unit 1 began in 1973, but Unit 2 barely broke ground, with only the containment base mat and some underground piping installed. In 1984, plans to construct Unit 2 were officially abandoned.

On September 25, 2008, Entergy filed a Combined Construction and Operating License (COL) application with the Nuclear Regulatory Commission (NRC) for Unit 3, a new nuclear reactor at River Bend. The 1550 MW_{e} Economic Simplified Boiling Water Reactor (ESBWR) was the selected design. The reactor's cost was estimated at $6.2 billion.

On January 9, 2009, Entergy indefinitely postponed work towards the license and construction of Unit 3.

== Electricity production ==
Generation (MWh) of River Bend Nuclear Station
Year	Jan	Feb	Mar	Apr	May	Jun	Jul	Aug	Sep	Oct	Nov	Dec	Annual (Total)
2001	714,084	650,382	748,010	463,174	736,871	698,777	728,459	732,547	535,261	322,474	721,677	748,489	7,800,205
2002	748,229	674,147	747,157	720,092	621,842	710,136	676,429	736,760	643,798	738,648	716,887	733,393	8,467,518
2003	739,521	542,471	306,254	356,196	729,601	695,523	727,359	726,653	639,513	728,573	711,801	737,904	7,641,369
2004	722,306	688,909	732,144	706,090	694,625	698,129	714,758	642,269	690,940	304,074	161,989	669,813	7,426,046
2005	689,187	415,590	575,690	708,083	711,891	507,585	661,641	708,425	683,677	716,629	707,515	722,774	7,808,687
2006	732,717	376,317	729,142	448,200	389,018	672,088	716,291	720,271	701,555	602,736	657,058	720,141	7,465,534
2007	725,147	661,186	711,238	549,766	418,966	426,290	723,145	716,879	598,654	579,550	422,760	650,988	7,184,569
2008	110,735	-8,132	342,423	712,110	720,704	671,406	727,695	718,214	153,794	735,665	716,106	733,145	6,333,865
2009	739,478	661,218	732,687	709,686	725,329	696,111	723,627	715,246	422,217	270,360	703,396	734,015	7,833,370
2010	735,775	658,333	715,171	708,270	728,688	683,304	697,143	599,913	695,580	732,733	672,628	735,625	8,363,163
2011	325,685	327,426	729,247	699,986	728,598	680,655	719,969	726,103	696,843	734,596	712,191	605,146	7,686,445
2012	727,099	686,985	720,502	681,706	276,570	428,340	724,571	721,835	694,129	723,125	708,300	712,012	7,805,174
2013	723,821	359,849	223,352	695,653	718,352	575,023	720,701	719,180	699,175	715,058	708,754	727,725	7,586,643
2014	726,806	656,717	727,282	694,877	721,252	694,172	712,122	705,345	683,474	503,828	705,399	623,720	8,154,994
2015	646,588	489,514	15,181	687,010	693,828	409,744	662,122	717,646	684,848	726,435	569,253	613,826	6,915,995
2016	180,432	280,102	613,706	675,624	721,754	318,997	714,545	711,497	695,187	716,159	700,659	726,407	7,055,069
2017	613,498	-6,913	381,761	677,357	705,398	570,939	670,332	597,486	668,879	717,886	704,179	731,480	7,032,282
2018	132,451	356,815	521,005	705,899	699,877	670,282	719,900	630,772	665,040	696,199	489,269	712,487	6,999,996
2019	587,387	473,138	490,473	-7,647	288,109	455,492	720,130	715,583	697,541	569,050	701,601	730,076	6,420,933
2020	707,060	674,073	725,431	674,267	724,229	681,322	667,703	586,010	663,112	709,063	460,145	715,955	7,988,370
2021	718,718	463,730	158,844	547,655	699,238	695,666	717,662	685,288	643,759	720,964	665,034	725,317	7,441,875
2022	730,195	651,300	726,737	700,089	713,570	691,376	712,095	706,957	690,584	710,635	660,315	611,865	8,305,718
2023	542,158	158,647	0	0	0	270,825	714,316	709,511	697,082	454,075	215,622	628,822	4,391,058
2024	728,385	680,343	719,889	699,602	716,703	689,429	713,604	714,142	685,117	721,514	699,154	721,420	8,489,302
2025	727,693	231,098	0	514,238	586,962	676,901	719,268	725,519	694,264	669,788	514,398	732,651	6,792,780
2026	733,253	657,104	721,881	696,356	716,749	684,981	711,583	436,881					--

== Surrounding population ==
The Nuclear Regulatory Commission defines two emergency planning zones around nuclear power plants: a plume exposure pathway zone with a radius of 10 miles (16 km), concerned primarily with exposure to, and inhalation of, airborne radioactive contamination, and an ingestion pathway zone of about 50 miles (80 km), concerned primarily with ingestion of food and liquid contaminated by radioactivity.

The 2010 U.S. population within 10 miles (16 km) of River Bend was 23,466, an increase of 11.1 percent in a decade, according to an analysis of U.S. Census data for msnbc.com. The 2010 U.S. population within 50 miles (80 km) was 951,103, an increase of 11.2 percent since 2000. Cities within 50 miles include Baton Rouge (25 miles to city center).

== Seismic risk ==
The Nuclear Regulatory Commission's estimate of the risk each year of an earthquake intense enough to cause core damage to the reactor at River Bend was 1 in 40,000, according to an NRC study published in August 2010.

== Safety record ==
Unlike the Waterford Nuclear Generating Station downriver in Hahnville, River Bend continued operation throughout Hurricane Katrina in 2005. The plant was shut down during Hurricane Gustav in 2008.

On May 21, 2025, the plant was shut down in order to repair a reactor coolant system leak (greater than 2 gallons per minute) that was later identified as coming from a leaking valve. The valve was fixed and the plant restarted May 26. Reported blackouts that occurred in southern Louisiana were originally blamed on the plant "unexpectedly tripping," but that was not the case - the grid operator had been notified that River Bend needed to shut down to repair a leak, and why they were not able to maintain the grid is still under investigation.

== See also ==
- Nuclear Power 2010 Program
- Waterford Nuclear Generating Station, in St. Charles Parish, Louisiana
