= Grand Gulf Nuclear Station =

Nuclear power plant in Mississippi

Grand Gulf Nuclear Generating Station

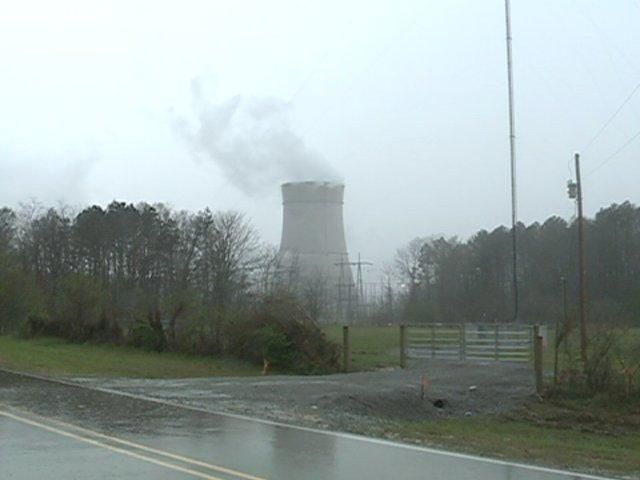
- Official name: Grand Gulf Nuclear Station
- Country: United States
- Location: Claiborne County, near Port Gibson, Mississippi
- Coordinates: 32°0′26″N 91°2′52″W
- Status: Operational
- Construction began: May 4, 1974
- Commission date: July 1, 1985
- Construction cost: $6.325 billion (2007 USD)
- Owners: Entergy (90%); Cooperative Energy (10%)
- Operator: Entergy Nuclear

Nuclear power station
- Reactor type: BWR
- Reactor supplier: General Electric
- Cooling towers: 1 × Natural Draft; 1 × Forced Draft Auxiliary
- Cooling source: Mississippi River
- Thermal capacity: 1 × 4408 MW_{th}

Power generation
- Units operational: 1 × 1443 MW
- Make and model: BWR-6 (Mark 3)
- Units cancelled: 1 × 1250 MW_{e} BWR-6; 1 × 1520 MW_{e} ESBWR
- Nameplate capacity: 1443 MW
- Capacity factor: 93.1% (2021); 84.50% (lifetime)
- Annual net output: 11,772 GWh (2021)

External links
- Website: Grand Gulf Nuclear Station

Grand Gulf Nuclear Station is a nuclear power station with one operational GE BWR reactor (General Electric boiling water reactor). It lies on a 2,100 acres (850 ha) site near Port Gibson, Mississippi, United States. The site is wooded and contains two lakes. The plant has a 520-foot natural draft cooling tower. As of January 2023, the plant employs 675 people.

Grand Gulf's reactor is the most powerful in the US and the 7th most powerful in the world, with a core power of 4408 MW_{th} yielding a nominal gross electrical output of 1443 MW_{e}.

Grand Gulf is operated by Entergy, which also owns 90% of the station through their subsidiary, System Energy Resources Inc. The other 10% is owned by Cooperative Energy.

== Units 2 and 3 ==
Adjacent to the operating Grand Gulf station, is an unfinished concrete structure that was to be the containment for Unit 2, a twin to the existing Unit 1. In December 1979, staggered by construction cost, Entergy (then called Middle South Utilities) stopped work on Unit 2.

On September 22, 2005, it was announced that Grand Gulf had been selected as the site for a GE ESBWR reactor. For details, see Nuclear Power 2010 Program. This was to be Unit 3.

In 2007, the U.S. Nuclear Regulatory Commission (NRC) issued an Early Site Permit (ESP) to Grand Gulf. In 2008, Entergy and NuStart submitted a Combined Construction and Operating License (COL) application for a potential new nuclear unit at the Grand Gulf.

On January 9, 2009, Entergy indefinitely postponed work towards the license and construction of Unit 3. In September 2015 the NRC withdrew the COL for the ESBWR unit, at the request of Entergy.

== Electricity production ==
Generation (MWh) of Grand Gulf Nuclear Generating Station
| Year | Jan | Feb | Mar | Apr | May | Jun | Jul | Aug | Sep | Oct | Nov | Dec | Annual (Total) |
|---|---|---|---|---|---|---|---|---|---|---|---|---|---|
| 2001 | 946,566 | 827,395 | 943,421 | 373,230 | 769,005 | 886,934 | 921,701 | 577,561 | 892,961 | 939,180 | 909,769 | 936,159 | 9,923,882 |
| 2002 | 942,615 | 850,731 | 937,821 | 898,970 | 920,634 | 774,045 | 929,756 | 881,648 | 324,094 | 733,226 | 909,649 | 956,270 | 10,059,459 |
| 2003 | 913,462 | 834,804 | 958,592 | 725,835 | 939,541 | 910,173 | 945,844 | 943,499 | 905,510 | 951,060 | 918,863 | 955,273 | 10,902,456 |
| 2004 | 954,299 | 630,422 | 204,870 | 926,499 | 947,366 | 917,959 | 945,455 | 944,332 | 920,171 | 951,935 | 927,442 | 962,016 | 10,232,766 |
| 2005 | 960,091 | 764,933 | 962,587 | 925,347 | 948,825 | 915,437 | 941,316 | 926,900 | 517,061 | 352,002 | 926,522 | 936,825 | 10,077,846 |
| 2006 | 953,661 | 867,326 | 859,264 | 846,413 | 600,537 | 836,421 | 868,533 | 867,998 | 905,894 | 951,101 | 923,926 | 937,512 | 10,418,586 |
| 2007 | 949,348 | 853,823 | 470,576 | 478,499 | 740,277 | 908,575 | 945,593 | 770,366 | 434,552 | 946,499 | 916,109 | 944,567 | 9,358,784 |
| 2008 | 792,280 | 708,874 | 811,788 | 904,539 | 944,431 | 904,995 | 938,324 | 927,518 | 617,447 | 13,971 | 880,470 | 952,153 | 9,396,790 |
| 2009 | 947,301 | 859,709 | 937,261 | 903,564 | 935,134 | 897,343 | 925,096 | 925,987 | 891,679 | 935,897 | 912,378 | 927,166 | 10,998,515 |
| 2010 | 927,032 | 838,099 | 720,744 | 641,334 | 103,232 | 899,621 | 927,176 | 915,585 | 902,584 | 932,927 | 903,900 | 931,007 | 9,643,241 |
| 2011 | 916,397 | 811,767 | 905,744 | 861,059 | 904,637 | 794,883 | 878,144 | 887,012 | 872,837 | 886,627 | 734,647 | 883,035 | 10,336,789 |
| 2012 | 896,989 | 536,825 | -7,775 | -6,737 | -10,447 | 271,292 | 899,636 | 971,194 | 1,000,457 | 1,077,666 | 996,207 | 670,827 | 7,296,134 |
| 2013 | 311,378 | 954,564 | 1,069,948 | 1,030,120 | 1,066,904 | 983,340 | 978,908 | 878,096 | 990,253 | 697,135 | 850,641 | 1,053,222 | 10,864,509 |
| 2014 | 1,008,823 | 292,730 | 138,072 | 778,925 | 1,032,810 | 937,411 | 967,125 | 965,377 | 994,435 | 1,048,219 | 1,035,260 | 1,052,996 | 10,252,183 |
| 2015 | 1,029,720 | 586,059 | 1,057,543 | 974,571 | 1,047,768 | 971,407 | 1,030,521 | 1,004,044 | 967,470 | 1,049,136 | 986,999 | 1,009,350 | 11,714,588 |
| 2016 | 1,013,775 | 611,185 | 3,560 | 964,026 | 1,064,006 | 704,577 | 294,454 | 1,045,677 | 236,051 | -13,622 | -12,913 | -13,504 | 5,897,272 |
| 2017 | -13,018 | 725,378 | 994,890 | 360,908 | 1,033,296 | 973,559 | 861,051 | 796,529 | -14,481 | 844,226 | 485,966 | 316,344 | 7,364,648 |
| 2018 | 502,875 | 649,325 | 1,035,677 | 189,417 | -5,898 | -6,427 | 129,490 | 867,532 | 725,282 | 1,051,752 | 1,004,849 | 775,596 | 6,919,470 |
| 2019 | 1,050,888 | 802,699 | 1,029,762 | 944,497 | 714,750 | 1,018,894 | 1,044,043 | 1,045,968 | 944,263 | 1,056,678 | 511,651 | 868,421 | 11,032,514 |
| 2020 | 1,036,228 | 746,816 | -4,509 | -7,062 | 409 | 772,960 | 935,853 | 297,805 | 880,380 | 868,888 | 145,989 | 797,177 | 6,470,934 |
| 2021 | 1,037,173 | 961,328 | 1,056,392 | 647,047 | 969,219 | 1,015,771 | 1,020,360 | 1,045,211 | 989,338 | 1,001,905 | 1,030,001 | 998,313 | 11,772,058 |
| 2022 | 1,059,368 | 871,081 | 0 | 0 | 910,407 | 1,004,532 | 165,636 | 646,908 | 1,012,974 | 1,021,251 | 992,970 | 915,203 | 8,430,330 |
| 2023 | 1,067,948 | 963,699 | 1,064,949 | 1,006,957 | 1,034,524 | 973,879 | 1,018,681 | 1,032,973 | 1,001,343 | 1,047,328 | 1,020,881 | 516,459 | 11,749,621 |
| 2024 | 922,542 | 978,862 | 41,634 | 1,034,828 | 953,128 | 995,101 | 1,039,168 | 1,030,913 | 1,012,603 | 1,054,194 | 579,349 | 1,047,783 | 10,690,105 |
| 2025 | 1,056,765 | 600,234 | 1,051,063 | 1,016,980 | 1,042,518 | 890,134 | 1,038,649 | 1,043,269 | 965,793 | 929,770 | 901,917 | 955,609 | 11,492,701 |
| 2026 | 949,784 | 366,372 | 72,810 | 984,518 | 937,441 | 1,005,486 | 1,042,404 | 1,045,427 | | | | | -- |

== Surrounding population ==
The Nuclear Regulatory Commission defines two emergency planning zones around nuclear power plants: a plume exposure pathway zone with a radius of 10 miles (16 km), concerned primarily with exposure to, and inhalation of, airborne radioactive contamination, and an ingestion pathway zone of about 50 miles (80 km), concerned primarily with ingestion of food and liquid contaminated by radioactivity.

The 2010 U.S. population within 10 miles (16 km) of Grand Gulf was 6,572, a decrease of 18.6 percent in a decade, according to an analysis of U.S. Census data for msnbc.com. The 2010 U.S. population within 50 miles (80 km) was 321,400, a decrease of 0.4 percent since 2000. Cities within 50 miles include Port Gibson (5 miles to city center), Vicksburg (25 miles). Alcorn State University is 25 miles southwest of the plant.

== Seismic risk ==
The Nuclear Regulatory Commission's estimate of the risk each year of an earthquake intense enough to cause core damage to the reactor at Grand Gulf was 1 in 83,333, according to an NRC study published in August 2010.

== Release of low levels of tritium into Mississippi River ==
After heavy rains in late April 2011, workers were pumping standing water collected in the abandoned, never-completed Unit 2 turbine building into the Mississippi River. Detectors sounded alarms at the presence of tritium in the water, and the pumping was stopped. The accidental release was reported to the Mississippi Health Department and the NRC. As of the dates of the news reports, it was unknown both how much tritium had entered the river and how the tritium had collected in the standing water, given that Unit 2 was not an operational reactor and had never been completed. It is unknown how much tritium entered the river because samples were not taken at the leak time. The NRC is investigating to find the source of the leak.

Tritium is a very low level beta emitter with an approximate half-life of 12.3 years and it cannot penetrate the outer dead layer of skin. The main concern with this isotope is inhalation or ingestion.

== See also ==
- US energy policy
- Energy Policy Act of 2005 (plans before 2009 were influenced by the energy policy of George W. Bush)
