= Nuclear Power 2010 Program =

Attempted program to increase US nuclear power

The "Nuclear Power 2010 Program" was launched in 2002 by President George W. Bush, 13 months after the beginning of his presidency, in order to restart orders for nuclear power reactors in the U.S. by providing subsidies for a handful of Generation III+ demonstration plants. The expectation was that these plants would come online by 2010, but this date was not met.

In March 2017, the leading nuclear-plant maker, Westinghouse Electric Company, filed for bankruptcy due to losing over US$9 billion in construction losses from working on two nuclear plants. This loss was partly caused by safety concerns due to the Fukushima disaster, Germany's Energiewende, the growth of solar and wind power, and low natural gas prices.

== Overview ==
The "Nuclear Power 2010 Program" was unveiled by the U.S. Secretary of Energy Spencer Abraham on February 14, 2002, as one means towards addressing the expected need for new power plants. The program was a joint government/industry cost-shared effort to identify sites for new nuclear power plants, to develop and bring to market advanced nuclear plant technologies, evaluate the business case for building new nuclear power plants, and demonstrate untested regulatory processes leading to an industry decision in the next few years to seek Nuclear Regulatory Commission (NRC) approval to build and operate at least one new advanced nuclear power plant in the United States.

Three consortia responded in 2004 to the U.S. Department of Energy's solicitation under the Nuclear Power 2010 initiative and were awarded matching funds.

- The Dominion-led consortium includes General Electric (GE) Energy, Hitachi America, and Bechtel Corporation, and has selected General Electric's Economic Simplified Boiling Water Reactor (ESBWR, a passively safe version of the BWR).
- The NuStart Energy Development, LLC consortium consists of DTE Energy, Duke Energy, EDF International North America, Entergy Nuclear, Exelon Generation, Florida Power & Light Co., Progress Energy, SCANA Corporation, Southern Company, GE Energy, Tennessee Valley Authority (TVA), and Westinghouse Electric Company and has chosen the General Electric Economic Simplified Boiling Water Reactor (ESBWR) and the Westinghouse Advanced Passive 1000 (AP1000, a PWR) reactor as candidates. The NuStart consortium was disbanded on 30 June 2012.
- The third consortium, led by TVA, includes General Electric, Toshiba, USEC Inc., Global Fuel-Americas, and Bechtel Power Corp., and will develop a feasibility study for a TVA site based on the General Electric Advanced Boiling Water Reactor (ABWR).

On September 22, 2005, NuStart selected Port Gibson (the Grand Gulf site) and Scottsboro (the Bellefonte site) for new nuclear units. Port Gibson should host an ESBWR (a passively safe version of the BWR) and Scottsboro an AP1000 (a passively safe version of the PWR). Entergy announced to prepare its own proposal for the River Bend Station in St. Francisville. Also, Constellation Energy of Baltimore had withdrawn its Lusby and Oswego sites from the NuStart finalist list after on September 15 announcing a new joint venture, UniStar Nuclear, with Areva to offer EPR (European Pressurized Reactors) in the U.S.A. Finally, in October 2005, Progress Energy Inc announced it was considering constructing a new nuclear plant and had begun evaluating potential sites in central Florida.

South Carolina Electric & Gas announced on February 10, 2006, that it chose Westinghouse for a plant to be built at the V.C. Summer plant in Jenkinsville, South Carolina.

NRG Energy announced in June 2006 that it would explore building two ABWRs at the South Texas Project. Four ABWRs were already operating in Japan at that time.

The original goal of bringing two new reactors online by 2010 was missed, and "of more than two dozen projects that were considered, only two showed signs of progress and even this progress was uncertain".

As of November 2026, the Plant Vogtle Units 3 and 4 have been completed while Vigil C. Summer is under active consideration for the restarting of construction.

== Energy Policy Act of 2005 ==
The Energy Policy Act of 2005, signed by President George W. Bush on August 8, 2005, has a number of articles related to nuclear power, and three specifically to the 2010 Program.

First, the Price-Anderson Nuclear Industries Indemnity Act was extended to cover private and Department of Energy plants and activities licensed through 2025.

Also, the government would cover cost overruns due to regulatory delays, up to $500 million each for the first two new nuclear reactors, and half of the overruns due to such delays (up to $250 million each) for the next four reactors. Delays in construction due to vastly increased regulation were a primary cause of the high cost of some earlier plants.

Finally, "A production tax credit of 1.8 cents per kilowatt-hour for the first 6,000 megawatt-hours from new nuclear power plants for the first eight years of their operation, subject to a $125 million annual limit. The production tax credit places nuclear energy on an equal footing with other sources of emission-free power, including wind and closed-loop biomass."

The Act also funds a Next Generation Nuclear Plant project at INEEL to produce both electricity and hydrogen. This plant will be a DOE project and does not fall under the 2010 Program.

== Recent developments ==
Between 2007 and 2009, 13 companies applied to the Nuclear Regulatory Commission for construction and operating licenses to build 25 new nuclear power reactors in the United States. However, the case for widespread nuclear plant construction was eroded due to abundant natural gas supplies, slow electricity demand growth in a weak U.S. economy during the 2008 financial crisis, lack of financing, and uncertainty following the Fukushima nuclear disaster of 2011 in Japan after a tsunami. Many license applications for proposed new reactors were suspended or cancelled.

Only a few new reactors were due enter service by 2020. These will not be cheaper than coal or natural gas, but they are an attractive investment for utilities because the government mandated that taxpayers pay for construction in advance. In 2013, four aging reactors were permanently closed due to the stringent requirements of the NRC and actions by local politicians.

As of November 2026, the Plant Vogtle Units 3 and 4 have been completed with Vigil C. Summer Unis 2 and 3 planned for resumption of construction as part of the Nuclear energy renewal in the United States under the backdrop of constant energy for the AI boom of the mid 2020s.

== See also ==
- Nuclear power plant
- Boiling water reactors
- Pressurized water reactors
- Generation III reactor
- Global Nuclear Energy Partnership
- Nuclear power in the United States
- Nuclear renaissance in the United States
- Nuclear safety
- Nuclear safety in the United States
- Nuclear whistleblowers
