= Dresden Generating Station =

Nuclear power plant in Grundy County, Illinois, US

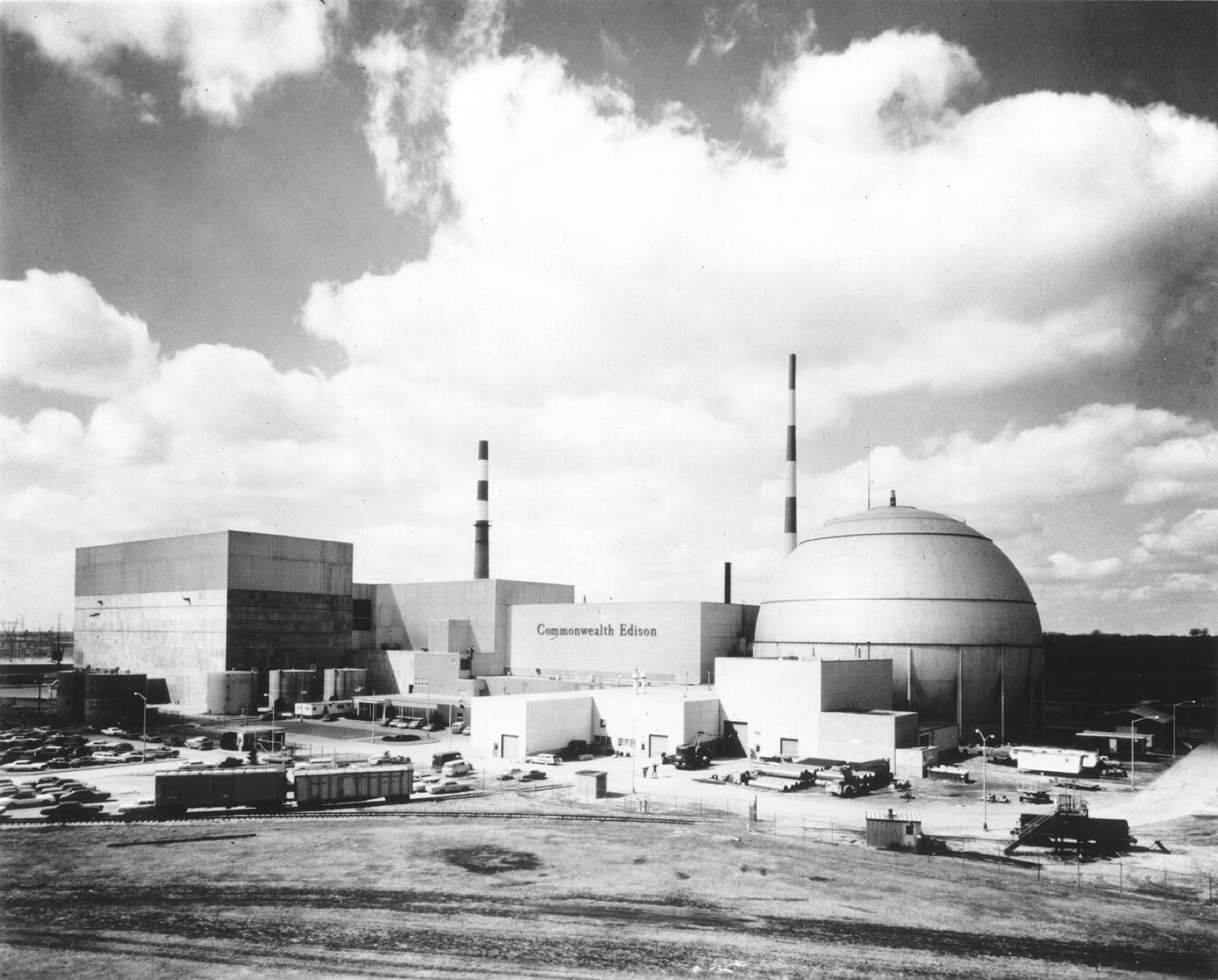
- Exterior view of Dresden Station circa 1971
- Country: United States
- Location: Goose Lake Township, Grundy County, near Morris, Illinois
- Coordinates: 41°23′23″N 88°16′5″W
- Status: Operational
- Construction began: Unit 1: May 1, 1956; Unit 2: January 10, 1966; Unit 3: October 14, 1966
- Commission date: Unit 1: July 4, 1960; Unit 2: June 9, 1970; Unit 3: November 16, 1971
- Decommission date: Unit 1: October 31, 1978
- Construction cost: Unit 1: $423 million (2010 USD) or $609 million in 2025 dollars Unit 2: $856 million (2010 USD) or $1.23 billion in 2025 dollars Unit 3: $828 million (2010 USD) or $1.19 billion in 2025 dollars
- Owner: Constellation Energy
- Operator: Constellation Energy

Nuclear power station
- Reactor type: BWR
- Reactor supplier: General Electric
- Cooling towers: 4 × Mechanical Draft (supplemental only)
- Cooling source: Direct open-cycle mode: (Note: Currently only allowed when both units are out of service, rarely used.); Closed-cycle mode: (Note: Used from October 1 through June 14.); Indirect open-cycle mode: (Note: Used from June 15 through September 30, or approximately 8.5 months of the year.)
- Thermal capacity: 1 × 700 MW_{th} (decommissioned); 2 × 2957 MW_{th}

Power generation
- Units operational: 1 × 902 MW; 1 × 895 MW
- Make and model: Unit 1: BWR-1 (Mark 1); Units 2–3: BWR-3 (Mark 1)
- Units decommissioned: 1 × 197 MW
- Nameplate capacity: 1797 MW
- Capacity factor: 98.13% (2017); 73.30% (lifetime, excluding Unit 1)
- Annual net output: 15,447 GWh (2017)

External links
- Website: Dresden Generating Station
- Commons: Related media on Commons

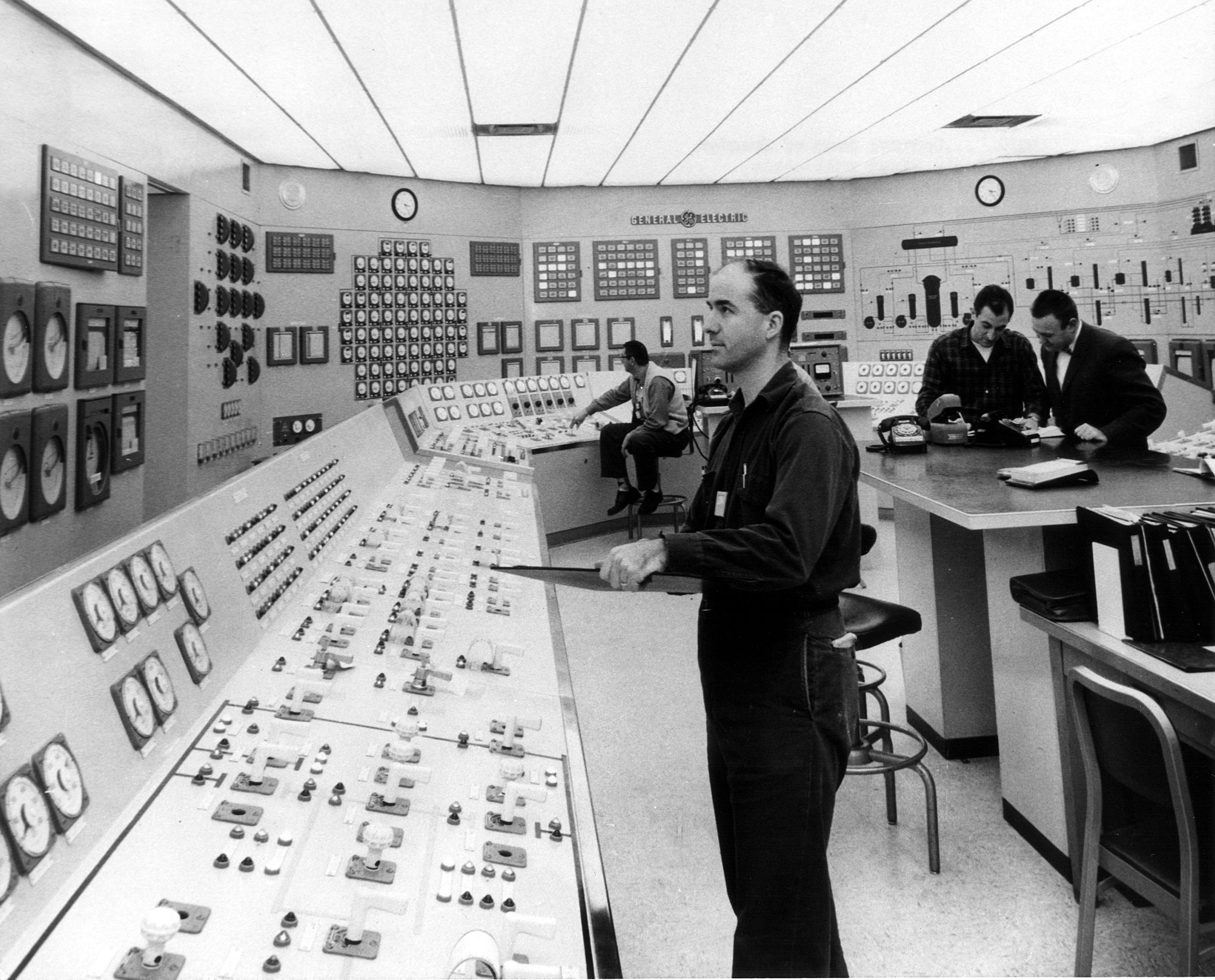
Control room of Dresden Station circa 1962

Dresden Generating Station (also known as Dresden Nuclear Power Plant or Dresden Nuclear Power Station) is the first privately financed nuclear power plant built in the United States. Dresden 1 was activated in 1960 and retired in 1978. Operating since 1970 are Dresden units 2 and 3, two General Electric BWR-3 boiling water reactors. Dresden Station is located on a 953-acre (386 ha) site in Grundy County, Illinois near the city of Morris. It is at the head of the Illinois River, where the Des Plaines River and Kankakee River meet. It is immediately northeast of the Morris Operation—the only de facto high-level radioactive waste storage site in the United States. It serves Chicago and the northern quarter of the state of Illinois, capable of producing 867 megawatts of electricity from each of its two reactors, enough to power over one million average American homes.

In 2004, the Nuclear Regulatory Commission (NRC) renewed the operating licenses for both reactors, extending them from forty years to sixty.

== Unit 1 ==
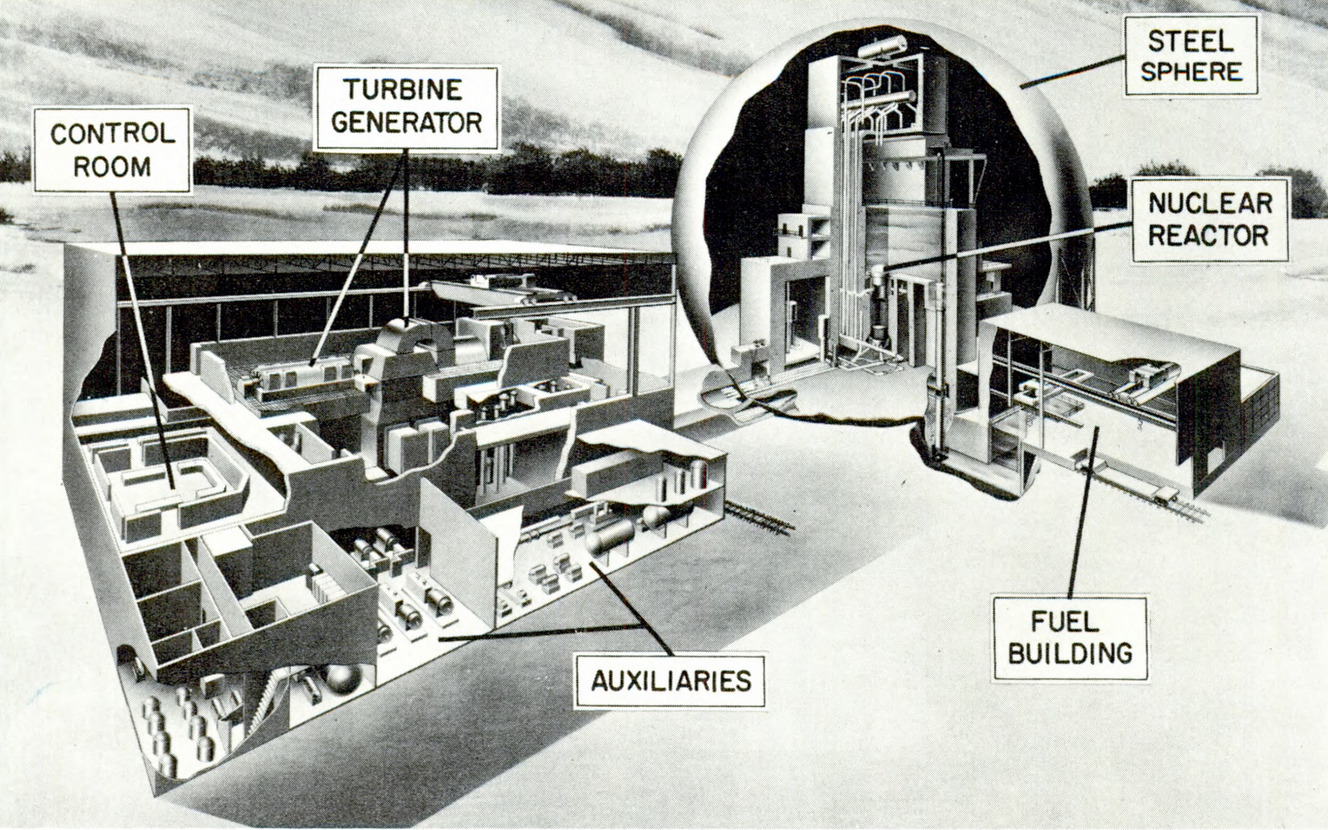
Inside the Dresden 1 nuclear power plant

After the Atomic Energy Act of 1954 allowed private companies to own and operate nuclear facilities, Commonwealth Edison contracted with General Electric to design, construct, and place into operation the 192 MWe Dresden Unit 1 for $45M in 1955. One-third of the contract price was shared by a consortium of eight companies comprising the Nuclear Power Group Inc.

The BWR at GE's Vallecitos Nuclear Center and the AEC's BORAX experiments provided research data and operator training for Dresden.

The core contained 488 fuel subassemblies, 80 control rods, and 8 instrument nozzles. Each subassembly contained 36 fuel rods in a Zircaloy-2 channel. The fuel was uranium dioxide clad in Zircaloy-2 tube. The core thermal power was 626 MWt. The reactor vessel was rated to 1015 psia and measured 12 feet 2 inches (3.71 m) diameter and 42 feet (13 m) tall.

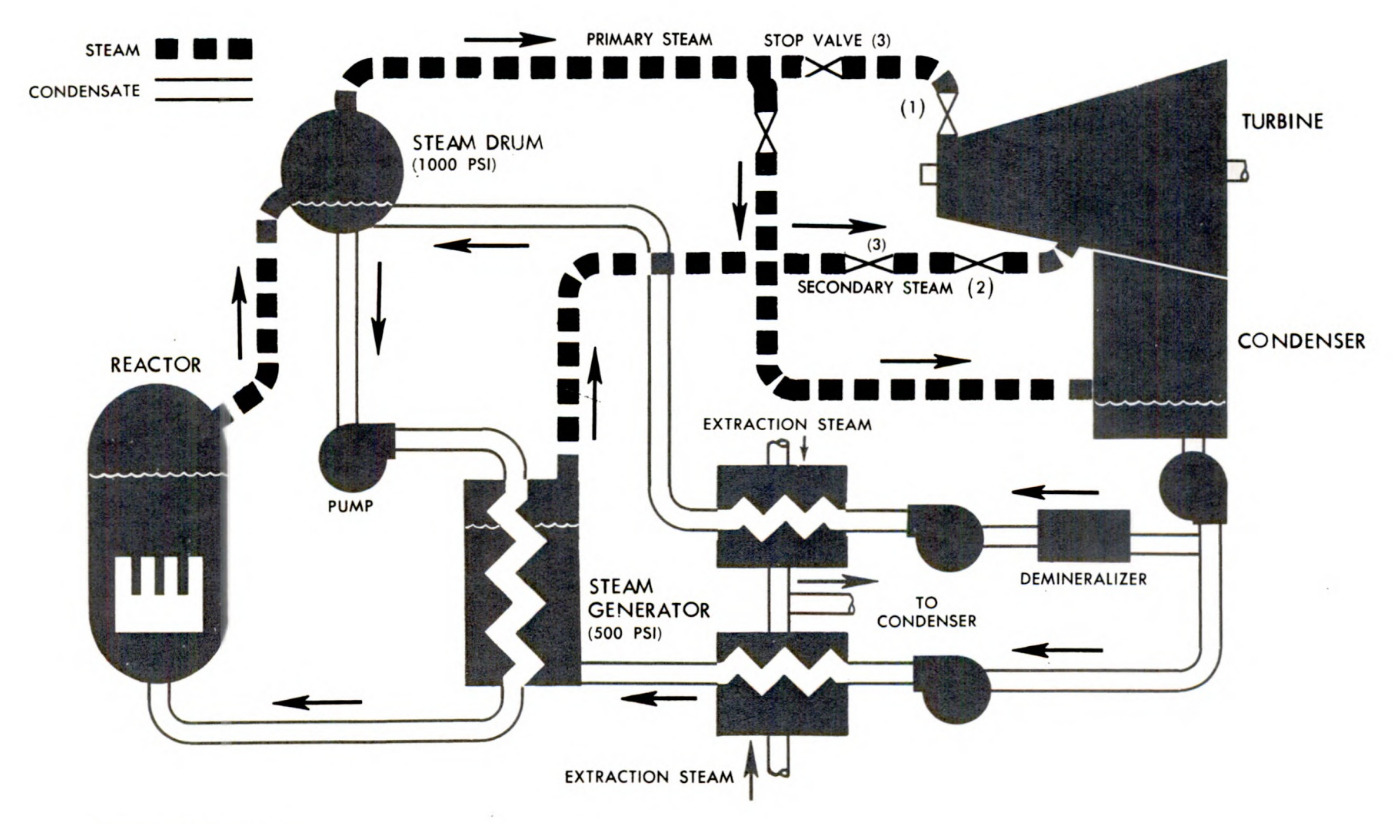
Dresden 1 Nuclear Flow Diagram featured a secondary steam generator for load following

The reactor featured a dual cycle, with steam coming from both the stream drum and steam generators. This made for rapid response to changes in power demand. Reactor power was regulated by actuation of the secondary admission valve by the turbine's governor. Decreasing the rate of secondary steam reduces reactor power, and vice versa. Thus, the secondary pressure varies with the external load.

Unit 1 was taken off-line on October 31, 1978 to allow retrofitting of equipment to meet new federal regulations and perform chemical decontamination of major piping systems. During the shutdown additional regulations were issued in response to the Three Mile Island accident. Due to the added cost of compliance with the new regulations and given the relative size and age of the reactor, Commonwealth Edison submitted a decommissioning plan to the NRC which was approved in September 1993.

== Cooling ==
The plant has three cooling modes:

- Direct open-cycle mode: (Note: Currently only allowed when both units are out of service, rarely used.) Intake from canal leading to the Kankakee River, (Note: During periods of low river flow, intake water may also be indirectly drawn from the Des Plaines River.) discharge directly to the Illinois River. The cooling canal system, cooling lake, and the supplementary cooling towers are completely bypassed in this mode of operation.
- Indirect open-cycle mode: (Note: Used from June 15 through September 30, or approximately 8.5 months of the year.) Intake from canal leading to the Kankakee River, (Note: Up to 940,000 US gallons per minute (59 m^{3}/s) is withdrawn from the river by six pumps each rated at 157,000 US gallons per minute (9.9 m^{3}/s)).) discharge to cooling canal leading to Dresden Cooling Lake, (Note: Water is pumped from the cooling canal into the 1,275 acres (516 ha) cooling lake via a lift station with 6 × 167,000 US gallons per minute (10.5 m^{3}/s) pumps. The cooling lake has 5 zones through which the water slowly travels over the course of 2.5 days before it exits the cooling lake.) discharged from lake through return cooling canal that eventually discharges into the Illinois River. Use of the cooling towers for supplemental cooling of canal system water is usually necessary during this mode of operation.
- Closed-cycle mode: (Note: Used from October 1 through June 14.) Intake from return cooling canal leading back from Dresden Cooling Lake, (Note: Limited amounts (up to 70,000 US gallons per minute (4.4 m^{3}/s)) of makeup water is drawn from the Kankakee River as needed, and limited discharge (up to 50,000 US gallons per minute (3.2 m^{3}/s)) to the Illinois River happens in order to minimize dissolved solids concentrations in the cooling canals/lake.) discharge to cooling canal leading to Dresden Cooling Lake. Use of the cooling towers for supplemental cooling of canal system water is usually not necessary during this mode of operation.

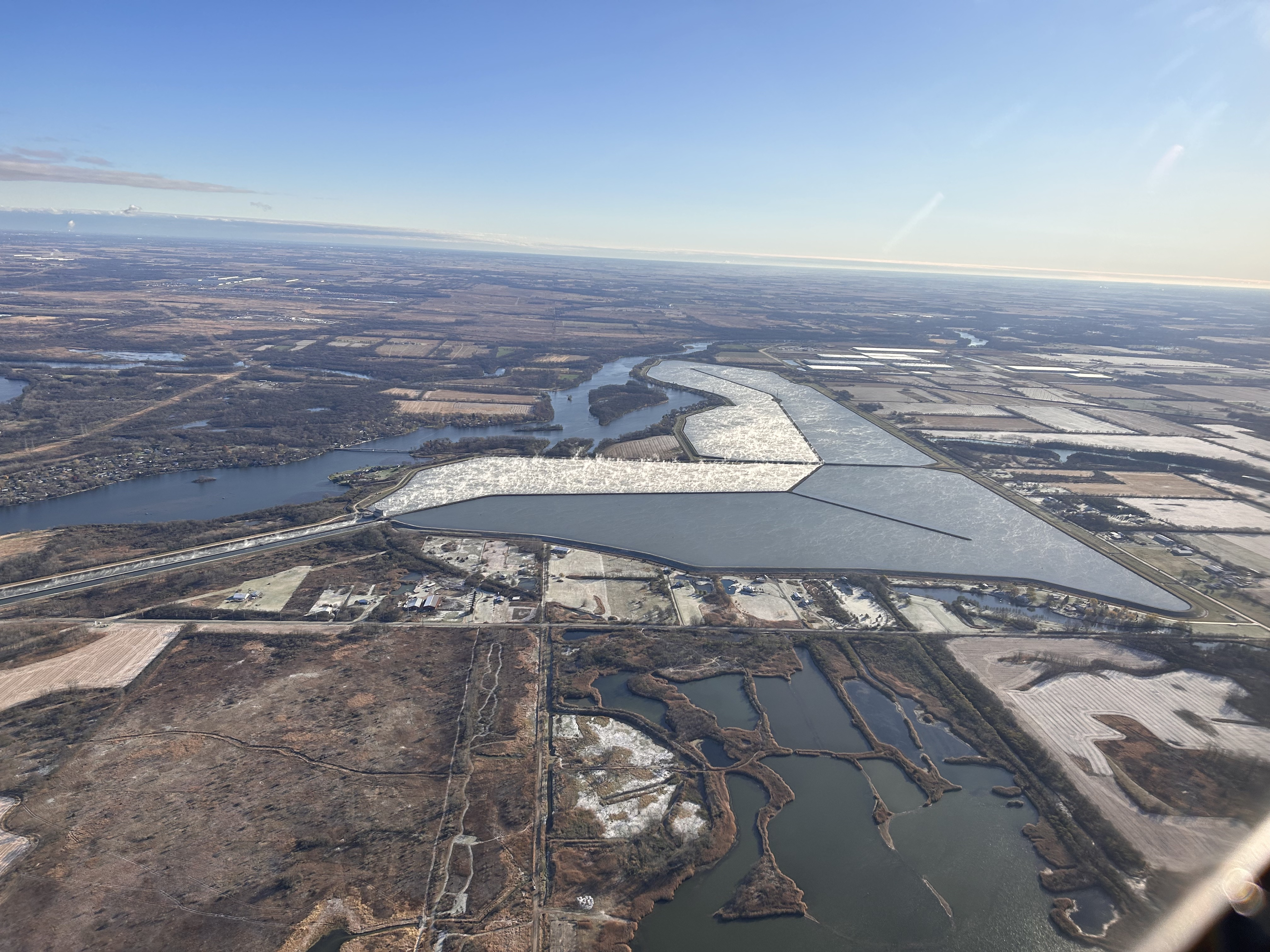
Dresden Cooling Lake

It also has cooling towers (Note: Prior to 2000, supplemental cooling was provided via spray canals (spray systems installed in both the hot and cold (return) cooling canals) rather than the current cooling towers.) (Note: 1 × 12-cell tower (single-wide, built between 2000 and 2001), 2 × 18-cell towers (double-wide, built in 2000), and 1 × 6-cell tower (single-wide, built between 2003 and 2004) with an overall total of 54 cells. The 12-cell tower is only used for supplementary cooling of the cold (return) cooling canal as necessary in order to maintain discharge water temperatures within permitted levels, while the three other cooling towers are used for the supplementary cooling of water in the hot cooling canal. The three hot canal cooling towers are fed by 7 pumps rated at 135,067 US gallons per minute (8.5214 m^{3}/s) each (total flow of 735,469 US gallons per minute (46.4009 m^{3}/s)). The single 12-cell cold (return) canal cooling tower is fed by 24 pumps rated at 8,800 US gallons per minute (0.56 m^{3}/s) each (total flow of 211,200 US gallons per minute (13.32 m^{3}/s)). The 6-cell tower was added to provide additional cooling for the extended power uprates (+17%) on Units 2 & 3 that Exelon requested in December 2000, which were approved by the NRC in December 2001, although it was not until the end of 2002 that the uprates were implemented at both units (the units were also not operated at the uprated power for most of 2003 due to steam dryer cracking problems), and this additional cooling tower meant to provide additional cooling capacity to accommodate the additional thermal output from the outrate was not added until sometime between 2003 and 2004.)

== Electricity production ==
Generation (MWh) of Dresden Generating Station
Year	Jan	Feb	Mar	Apr	May	Jun	Jul	Aug	Sep	Oct	Nov	Dec	Annual (Total)
2001	1,193,458	1,054,333	1,187,102	981,943	1,132,442	1,127,280	1,031,337	1,135,702	932,498	892,446	945,681	924,451	12,538,673
2002	1,234,842	1,108,990	1,059,816	1,186,361	1,210,951	1,176,948	1,133,199	1,210,328	1,097,968	797,663	1,223,682	1,145,176	13,585,924
2003	1,246,460	1,160,493	1,250,523	1,242,216	1,212,105	1,058,939	1,293,159	1,291,997	1,230,004	847,958	941,888	901,425	13,677,167
2004	1,216,081	1,157,391	1,286,564	1,113,658	954,565	1,250,516	1,294,621	1,075,250	1,006,250	1,131,669	1,176	858,976	12,346,717
2005	1,296,266	1,149,577	1,203,983	1,153,170	1,211,033	1,220,520	1,288,247	1,227,178	943,039	1,264,403	373,412	1,291,625	13,622,453
2006	1,295,498	1,164,240	1,292,561	1,248,987	1,281,759	1,245,263	1,232,623	1,284,318	1,246,890	1,290,115	568,728	1,291,064	14,442,046
2007	1,294,287	1,163,545	1,293,573	1,253,535	1,199,725	1,248,937	1,291,916	1,281,698	1,202,803	1,228,109	783,991	1,288,662	14,530,781
2008	1,085,546	1,211,845	1,289,661	1,252,854	1,292,759	1,248,659	1,291,802	1,283,863	1,092,984	1,208,852	832,043	1,293,977	14,384,845
2009	1,297,183	1,161,648	1,283,016	1,186,675	1,282,268	1,246,218	1,289,811	1,286,199	1,242,479	1,201,845	578,552	1,211,519	14,267,413
2010	1,307,507	1,180,006	1,301,495	1,254,920	1,282,526	1,248,695	1,283,631	1,282,172	1,248,247	1,185,775	712,494	1,305,655	14,593,123
2011	1,311,449	1,174,027	1,306,344	1,262,166	1,279,032	1,248,876	1,258,176	1,278,908	1,244,684	971,176	1,041,964	1,337,521	14,714,323
2012	1,346,736	1,251,071	1,320,626	1,281,096	1,297,546	1,265,316	1,259,150	1,265,070	1,140,079	1,262,012	862,794	1,250,504	14,802,000
2013	1,385,187	1,256,336	1,383,409	1,330,425	1,342,703	1,311,561	1,353,411	1,347,863	1,309,659	1,166,351	866,361	1,359,206	15,412,472
2014	1,372,469	1,258,105	1,384,760	965,983	1,265,939	1,314,171	1,359,344	1,353,622	1,296,753	1,237,769	936,656	1,383,369	15,128,940
2015	1,302,562	1,099,619	1,377,180	1,323,646	1,334,905	1,304,534	1,361,087	1,355,055	1,310,891	1,316,146	872,051	1,230,682	15,188,358
2016	1,392,370	1,295,151	1,360,106	1,320,647	1,329,951	1,299,800	1,350,994	1,328,256	1,240,328	1,185,785	969,514	1,370,991	15,443,893
2017	1,390,462	1,246,232	1,379,854	1,317,074	1,351,025	1,308,476	1,351,499	1,355,759	1,229,144	1,195,284	943,489	1,376,584	15,444,882
2018	1,395,679	1,255,218	1,374,523	1,329,334	1,336,410	1,281,471	1,337,561	1,343,205	1,275,664	1,190,411	1,057,082	1,361,577	15,538,135
2019	1,372,972	1,263,033	1,382,807	1,328,485	1,225,938	1,316,784	1,346,740	1,333,857	1,138,813	1,135,829	1,002,013	1,234,444	15,081,715
2020	1,284,207	1,302,119	1,380,077	1,299,281	1,348,037	1,304,960	1,339,834	1,236,024	1,290,826	1,139,730	1,170,837	1,382,956	15,478,888
2021	1,391,356	1,260,404	1,374,530	1,319,595	1,148,772	1,301,750	1,353,735	1,340,707	1,301,614	909,872	870,624	1,383,721	14,956,680
2022	1,394,155	1,257,900	1,375,753	1,256,880	1,343,351	1,292,553	1,289,656	1,344,736	1,299,094	1,251,188	920,098	1,383,586	15,408,950
2023	1,384,921	1,247,143	1,357,294	1,157,187	1,333,924	1,300,289	1,338,236	1,341,796	1,276,309	1,198,281	962,559	1,371,259	15,269,189
2024	1,384,689	1,284,436	1,338,397	1,310,136	1,322,304	1,287,859	1,339,367	1,233,133	1,257,329	1,138,946	971,786	1,384,089	15,252,471
2025	1,394,383	1,235,536	1,368,889	1,318,811	1,302,756	1,285,846	1,324,426	1,336,521	1,177,600	1,171,925	899,337	1,389,312	15,205,342
2026	1,388,746	1,251,985	1,371,154	1,166,566	1,333,396	1,308,444	1,337,714	1,350,754					--

== Incidents ==
Between the 1970s and 1996, Dresden was fined $1.6 million for 25 incidents.

- June 5, 1970: A false high pressure signal due to instrument failure on the Dresden II reactor pressure control system caused turbine valves to dump steam (a "turbine trip"), which in turn automatically initiated a SCRAM. Void collapse in the reactor water caused the reactor water level to drop, which resulted in an automatic increase in feedwater flow. The feedwater pumps then tripped on low suction pressure. One pump turned back on automatically when the low suction pressure signal reset, feeding water rapidly into the now lower-pressure reactor vessel. Water level in the reactor rose rapidly until water entered the main steam lines. At this point, the false high pressure signal disappeared. The turbine dump valves closed, increasing back pressure in the reactor vessel and slowing the feedwater inlet flow. Cooling reactor water temperature caused further void collapse. Reactor water level began to rapidly lower once again. This again automatically caused the feedwater system to increase the flow rate into the vessel, and began to raise reactor water level. As cooler feedwater was again rapidly pumped into the reactor, void collapse caused water level to lower. The feedwater system responded by increasing feedwater flow. However, the indicator needle on the water level recorder stuck, which caused the operator to assume level had stopped rising in the reactor. The operator began increasing feedwater flow in order to raise water level in the reactor, manually overriding the automatic control system. The operator never checked a second indicator that showed the increasing level. Reactor water level continued rising and flooded the main steam lines. Two minutes later, the operator tapped on the water level recorder and the water level needle became unstuck, at which point the operator began reacting to the now high water level by manually reducing feedwater flow. At this point, the operator manually opened a steam line relief valve to reduce rising reactor pressure. However, due to the earlier introduction of water into the main steam lines, a hydrostatic shock occurred in the steam lines, which caused a safety valve to open, admitting steam and water into the drywell causing drywell pressure to increase. This caused the initiation of safety injection systems, and for the next 30 minutes reactor water level and pressure seesawed as the operators attempted to stabilize the reactor. It was not until two hours later that reactor level, reactor pressure and drywell pressure were reduced to normal. The movie The China Syndrome bases its initial plot device on this event, with the needle becoming unstuck when the operator taps the recorder.
- December 8, 1971: Events similar to the ones the year earlier on Dresden II occur on Dresden III.
- May 15, 1996: Lowering water levels around the nuclear fuel in unit 3 reactor's core prompt a shut down at Dresden Generating Station and placement on the NRC's "watch list" that merit closer scrutiny by regulators. Dresden was on the NRC watch list six out of nine years between 1987 and 1996, longer than any of the 70 other operating plants in the nation.
- July 15, 2011: Plant declared an Alert at 10:16 a.m after a chemical leak of sodium hypochlorite restricted access to a vital area that houses plant cooling water pumps.

== Surrounding population ==
The Nuclear Regulatory Commission defines two emergency planning zones around nuclear power plants: a plume exposure pathway zone with a radius of 10 miles (16 km), concerned primarily with exposure to, and inhalation of, airborne radioactive contamination, and an ingestion pathway zone of about 50 miles (80 km), concerned primarily with ingestion of food and liquid contaminated by radioactivity.

The 2010 U.S. population within 10 miles (16 km) of Dresden was 83,049, an increase of 47.6 percent in a decade, according to an analysis of U.S. Census data for msnbc.com. The 2010 U.S. population within 50 miles (80 km) was 7,305,482, an increase of 3.5 percent since 2000. Cities within 50 miles include Chicago (43 miles to city center).

== Ownership ==
Both currently operating units are owned and operated by Constellation Energy following separation from Exelon, which also owns and is responsible for the decommissioning of Unit 1. Prior to August 3, 2000, all three units were owned by Commonwealth Edison.

== Seismic risk ==
The Nuclear Regulatory Commission's estimate of the risk each year of an earthquake intense enough to cause core damage to the reactor at Dresden was 1 in 52,632, according to an NRC study published in August 2010.

== Averted closure ==
In August 2020, Exelon announced they would close the plant in November 2021 for economic reasons, despite the plant having licenses to operate for about another 10 years and the ability to renew the licenses for an additional 20 years beyond that. On September 13, 2021, the Illinois state senate passed a bill subsidizing the Byron and Dresden nuclear plants, which Governor J. B. Pritzker signed into law on September 15, and Exelon announced it would refuel the plants.
