= Morris Operation =

Spent nuclear fuel storage site

Coordinates: 41°22′51.9″N 88°16′37.1″W

The Morris Operation in Grundy County, Illinois, United States, is the location of the only permanent de facto high-level radioactive waste storage site in the United States and holds 772 tons of spent nuclear fuel. It is owned by GE Vernova Hitachi Nuclear Energy and located near the city of Morris. The site is located immediately southwest of Dresden Generating Station. Spent nuclear fuel assemblies are stored at this away-from-reactor, Independent Spent Fuel Storage Installation (ISFSI) in a spent fuel storage pool. The storage basins at the Morris Operation store spent high-level radioactive waste from Connecticut Yankee Nuclear Power Plant, Cooper Nuclear Station, Dresden Generating Station, Monticello Nuclear Generating Plant, and San Onofre Nuclear Generating Station. The newest fuel currently in storage has been at the site since 1989, and the basins are essentially full. No new fuel will be received and storage is limited to the current inventory.

== Nuclear fuel reprocessing ==
The facility was originally constructed by General Electric to reprocess spent nuclear fuel, but was never operational in that use. Testing in 1975 revealed that the facility would not operate properly without extensive modifications, and the facility's application for a license to reprocess was withdrawn. In 2007 and 2013 proposals were advanced for the completion of the reprocessing facility.
