= GE BWR =

Type of commercial fission reactor

GE BWR (General Electric Boiling Water Reactor)
- Generation: Generation I (BWR-1); Generation II; Generation III (ABWR); Generation III+ (ESBWR)
- Reactor concept: Light water reactor (LWR)
- Reactor line: Boiling water reactor (BWR)
- Designed by: General Electric
- Manufactured by: General Electric
- Status: 83 reactors built, 43 reactors operational (As of March 2026)

Main parameters of the reactor core
- Fuel (fissile material): ^{235}U/^{239}Pu (LEU/MOX)
- Fuel state: Solid
- Neutron energy spectrum: Thermal
- Primary control method: Control rods
- Primary moderator: Light water
- Primary coolant: Liquid (water)

Reactor usage
- Primary use: Generation of electricity
- Power (thermal): 530 MW_{th} (BWR-1); 1500 MW_{th} (BWR-2); 2400 MW_{th} (BWR-3); 3000 MW_{th} (BWR-4); 3100 MW_{th} (BWR-5); 3400 MW_{th} (BWR-6); 4000 MW_{th} (ABWR); 4500 MW_{th} (ESBWR)
- Power (electric): 160 MW_{e} (BWR-1); 650 MW_{e} (BWR-2); 460 MW_{e} (BWR-3); 784 MW_{e} (BWR-4); 1050 MW_{e} (BWR-5); 1150 MW_{e} (BWR-6); 1400 MW_{e} (ABWR); 1600 MW_{e} (ESBWR)

Schematic GE BWR inside a Mark I containment.

General Electric's BWR product line of boiling water reactors represents the designs of a relatively large (~18%) percentage of the commercial fission reactors around the world.

The progenitor of the BWR line was the 5 MW Vallecitos Boiling Water Reactor (VBWR), brought online in October 1957. Six design iterations, BWR-1 through BWR-6, were introduced between 1955 and 1972.

This was followed by the Advanced Boiling Water Reactor (ABWR) introduced in the 1990s and the Economic Simplified Boiling Water Reactor (ESBWR) introduced in the early 2010s.

As of August 2018, 83 reactors of this design family have been built, of which 67 reactors are operational.

The design garnered world attention in the aftermath of the INES level 7 Fukushima Daiichi nuclear disaster of 11 March 2011. GE had been a major contractor to the Fukushima Daiichi Nuclear Power Plant in Japan, which consisted of six boiling water reactors of GE design. The reactors for Units 1, 2, and 6 were supplied by General Electric, the other three by Toshiba and Hitachi. Unit 1 was a 460 MW boiling water reactor from the BWR-3 design iteration introduced in 1965 and constructed in July 1967.

After the plant became severely damaged in the Tōhoku earthquake and tsunami, loss of reactor core cooling led to three nuclear meltdowns, three hydrogen explosions, and the release of radioactive contamination in Units 1, 2 and 3 between 12 and 15 March. Safe operation of this reactor design family depends on continued coolant flow at all times during operation. A reactor after a full-power shutdown may require active cooling of decay heat from long-lived radioactive isotopes for a year or more.

== History ==
The progenitor of the BWR line was the 5 MW Vallecitos Boiling Water Reactor (VBWR), brought online in October 1957.

=== BWR-1 ===
- BWR Type 1 (BWR-1, BWR/1): In 1955 GE developed their original VBWR design into the 197 MW Dresden 1 (6×6, 7×7) reactor, embodying the first iteration of GE's BWR/1 design. Dresden 1 used forced circulation (via external recirculation pumps) and a unique dual cycle (direct+indirect) heat transfer design that proved to be uneconomical. GE further developed the BWR-1 design with the 70 MW Big Rock Point (9×9, 11×11, 12×12) reactor, which (like all GE BWR models following Dresden 1) used the more economical direct cycle method of heat transfer, but disposed with the external recirculation pumps in favor of natural circulation (an unusual strategy that only the 55 MW Dodewaard reactor adopted, although this technique has been resurrected for the newest Gen III+ ESBWR). The 65 MW Humboldt Bay (6×6, 7×7) reactor followed Big Rock Point, returning to the more efficient forced circulation method (via external recirculation pumps). These experimental designs (all of which shared the BWR-1 classification despite their divergent designs) used fuel rod bundles in 6×6, 7×7, 8×8, 9×9, 11×11, and 12×12 configurations, but GE's 9×9 bundle later used in BWR/2–6 reactors is different from the one used in the BWR/1 era. The BWR/1 was the first BWR design with internal steam separation. It also had an isolation condenser, and pressure suppression containment.

=== BWR-2 ===
- BWR Type 2 (BWR-2, BWR/2): Introduced in 1963, >500 MW_{e}, typically around 650 MW_{e} gross (Oyster Creek, Nine Mile Point 1). Included a large direct cycle. 5 recirculation loops, variable speed external recirculation pumps (one pump per loop, each pump's flow rate could be varied from 6,400 to 32,000 US gallons per minute (0.40 to 2.02 m^{3}/s)). This design, as well as the BWR/3–6, would all later be classified as Generation II reactors for their increased scale, improved safety features, commercial viability, profitability, the first turnkey plant, and long lifetime.

=== BWR-3 ===
- BWR Type 3 (BWR-3, BWR/3): Introduced in 1965, 800 MW_{e} (Dresden 2–3). First use of internal jet pumps (single nozzle, 10 per loop, 20 total). 2 recirculation loops, variable speed recirculation pumps (one pump per loop, each pump had a rated flow of 45,200 US gallons per minute (2.85 m^{3}/s)). Improved ECCS spray and flood, improved feedwater spargers. Monticello and Pilgrim 1 had significantly lower power ratings despite also being classified as BWR/3 models.

=== BWR-4 ===
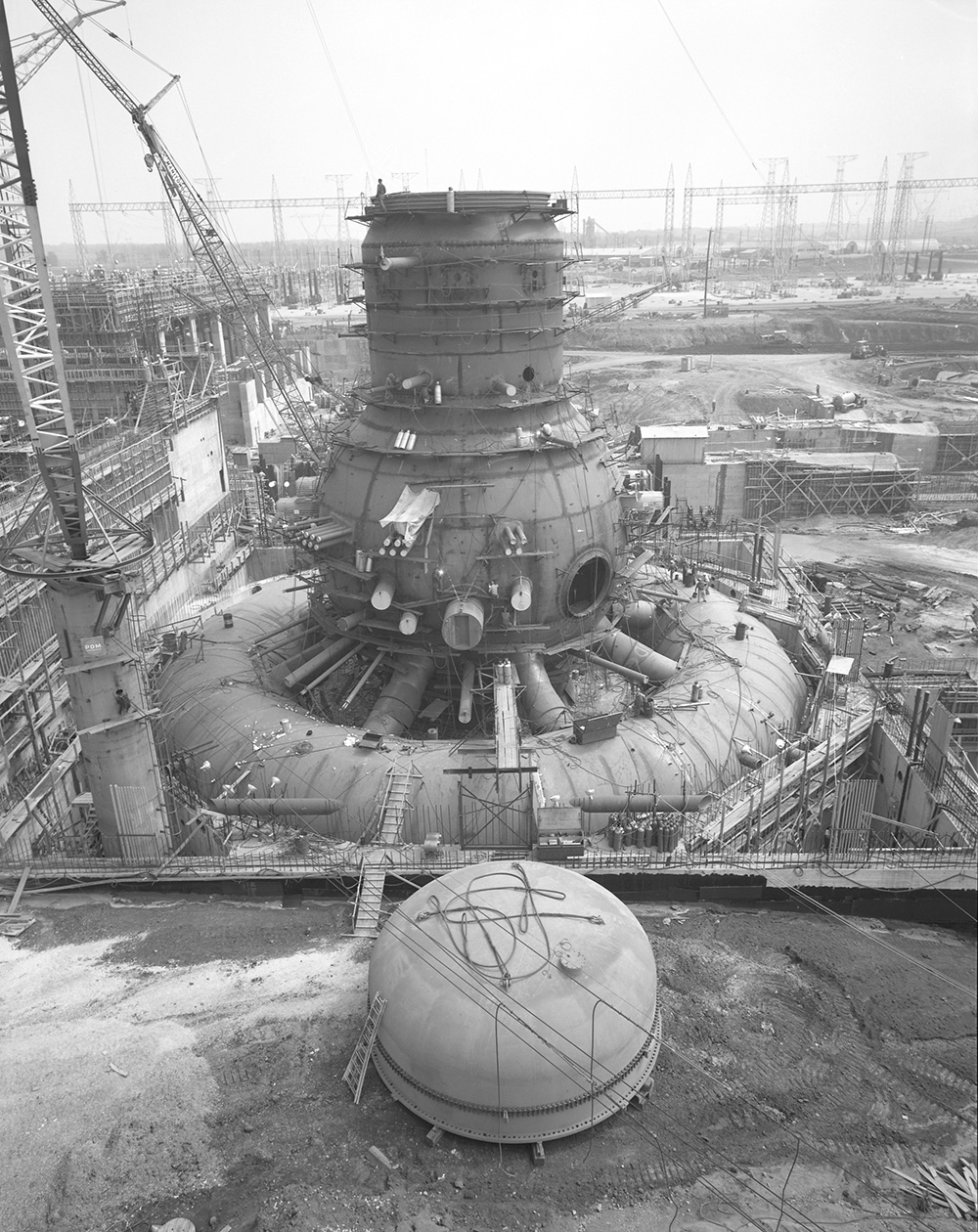
Browns Ferry Unit 1 drywell and wetwell under construction, within a Mark I containment

- BWR Type 4 (BWR-4, BWR/4): Introduced in 1966, 1100 MW_{e} (Browns Ferry 1–3). Largely similar to the BWR/3 in design with an identical recirculation system, but power density was increased by 10%. Available with either Mark I or Mark II containment.

=== BWR-5 ===
- BWR Type 5 (BWR-5, BWR/5): Introduced in 1969, 1100 MW_{e} (LaSalle 1–2). Same number of loops (2) & jet pumps (20), but the jet pumps were upgraded to a five nozzle design. Variable speed pumps were replaced with two-speed pumps (each rated at 35,400 US gallons per minute (2.23 m^{3}/s) for a discharge pressure head of 865 feet (264 m)), and a flow control valve (adjustable from 22% open to 100% open with a linear flow response) was added to each loop for use in regulating recirculation flow (capable of regulating recirculation flow between 35% and 100% with the pumps in the fast speed setting, or between 30% and 40% with the pumps in the slow speed setting). Improved ECCS valve flow control. Only available with Mark II containment.

=== BWR-6 ===
- BWR Type 6 (BWR-6, BWR/6): Introduced in 1972, available in configurations ranging from 600 to 1400 MW_{e}. Transitioned from 7×7 to 8×8 fuel bundle with longer and thinner fuel rods that fit within the same external footprint as the previous 7×7 fuel bundle, reduced fuel duty (to 13.4 kW/ft (44 kW/m)), improved compact jet pumps with higher circulation capacity (available with 16–24 total jet pumps depending on the configuration), increased capacity of the steam separators and dryers, increased fuel capacity, increased output (20% increase vs. BWR/5 when using the same size pressure vessels), improved ECCS, introduced an option for a compact control room, and introduced a solid-state nuclear system protection system option (only Clinton took this). First and only model available with Mark III containment.

=== ABWR ===
- ABWR: Higher safety margins, no external recirculation loops, reactor internal pumps. It also has fine motion control rod drives.

=== ESBWR ===
- ESBWR: Passive safety, natural circulation (no loops or pumps), 1600 MW_{e}. It has a gravity flooder, isolation condenser, and passive containment cooling.

=== Comparison ===
Comparison GE BWR, ABWR, and ESBWR Design
| | System | Circulation | Primary Containment | ECCS | Reactor Isolation |
|---|---|---|---|---|---|
| BWR-1 | Dual cycle | Forced (Pumps) | Spherical dry structure | 2-CS | |
| BWR-2 | Direct cycle | 3-5 Loops | Mark I | HPCI 2-CS | IC, Passive System |
| BWR-3 | Direct cycle | 2 Loops, 1 nozzle jet pump | Mark I | HPCI 2-CS | IC/RCIC Active System |
| BWR-4 | Direct cycle | 2 Loops, 1 nozzle jet pump | Mark I or Mark II | HPCI 2-CS LPCI | RCIC Active System |
| BWR-5 | Direct cycle | 2 Loops, 5 nozzle jet pump | Mark II | HPCI LPCS 3-LPCI | RCIC Active System |
| BWR-6 | Direct cycle | 2 Loops, 5 nozzle jet pump | Mark III | HPCI LPCS 3-LPCI | RCIC Active System |
| ABWR | | Forced, 10 internal pump | Pressure Suppression RCCV | | RCIC Active System |
| ESBWR | | Natural | Pressure Suppression RCCV | | ICS Passive |
Note: CS Core Spray, ECCS Emergency Core Cooling System, HPCS: High-Pressure Core Spray, LPCS: Low-Pressure Core Spray, RCIC: Reactor Core Isolation Cooling, RCCV: Reinforced Concrete Containment Vessel, ICS: Isolation Condenser System

== Fuel Rod Bundles ==
=== GE-2 ===
- 7x7 fuel bundle.

=== GE-3 ===
- Improved 7x7 fuel bundle with 49 fuel rods, one of which is segmented.

=== GE-4 ===
- 8x8 fuel bundle with 63 fuel rods and 1 water rod.

=== GE-5 ===
- Retrofit 8x8 fuel bundle prepressurized and barrier fuel bundles containing 62 and two water rods.

=== GE-6 & 7 ===
- Prepressurized at 3 standard atmospheres (300 kPa) with helium with a Barrier

=== GE-8 ===
- 8x8 fuel bundle with 58 to 62 fuel rods and 2–6 water rods. Prepressurized at 5 standard atmospheres (510 kPa) with helium.

== Containment ==
=== Mark I ===
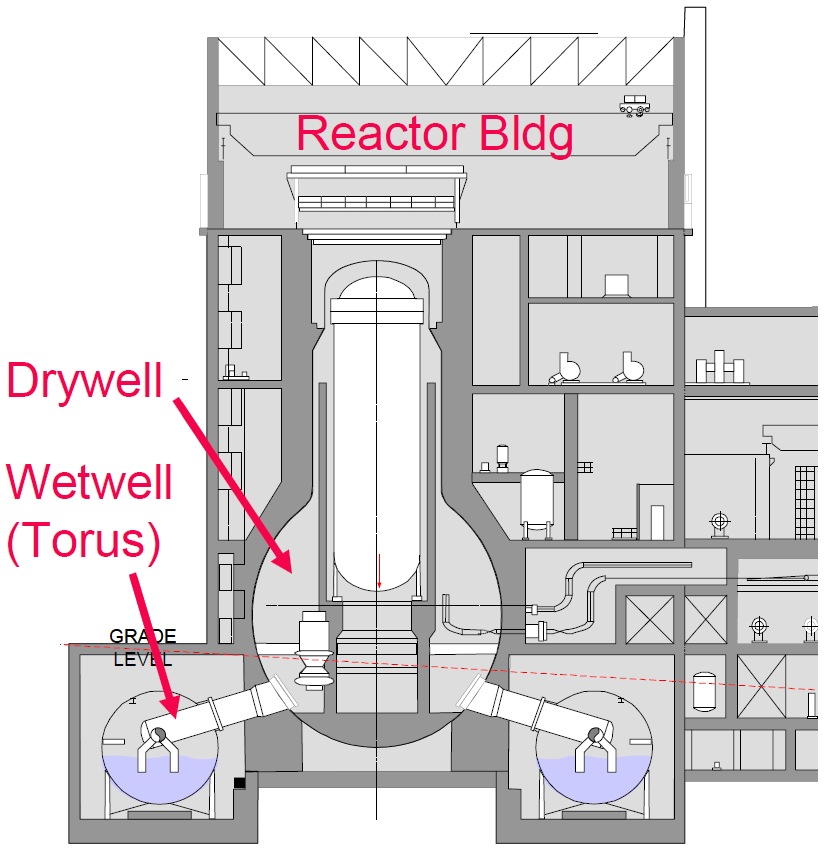
Schematic BWR inside Mark I containment.

A drywell containment building which resembles an inverted lightbulb above the wetwell which is a steel torus containing water.

=== Mark II ===
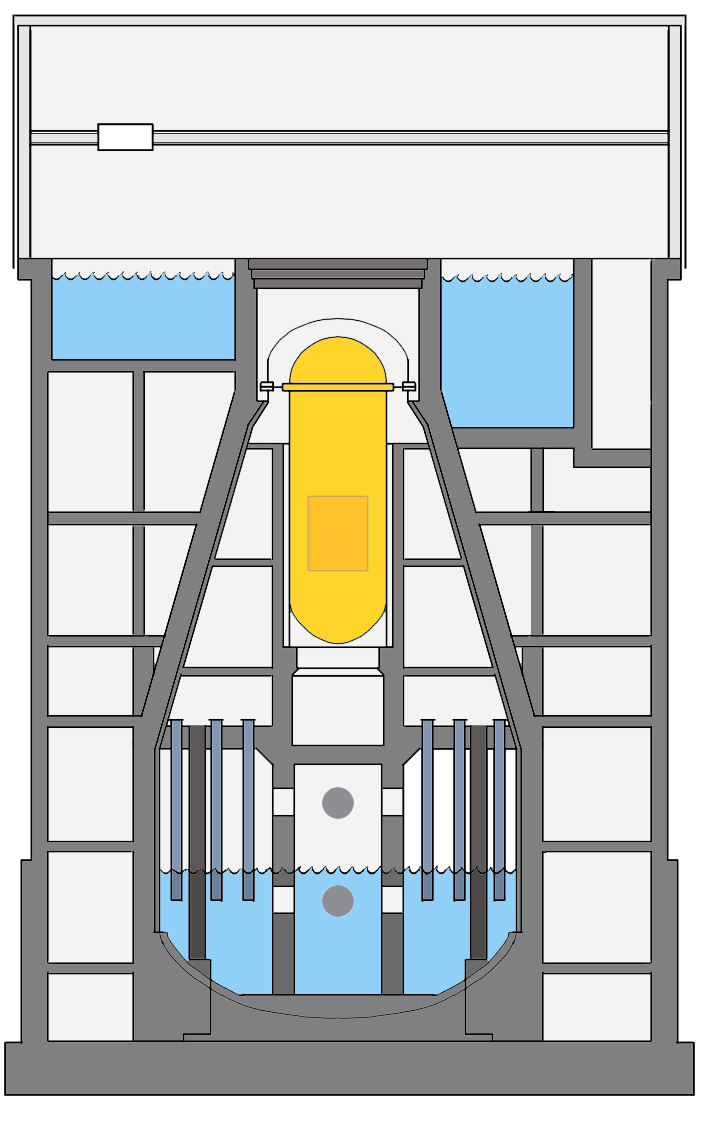
BWR inside a Mark II containment.

Described as an "over-under" configuration with the drywell forming a truncated cone on a concrete slab. Below is a cylindrical suppression chamber made of concrete rather than just sheet metal.

=== Mark III ===
The GE Mark III Containment-system is a single barrier pressure containment and multi-barrier fission containment system, consisting of the containment vessel plus associated dry- and wetwell (pressure and fission barriers), the external shield building of it, the auxiliary building and the fuel building, all of which are normally kept at negative pressure which prevents the egress of fission products.

Features of the containment:

- Improved seismic response
- Lower pressure containment design, but significant larger volume than Mark I and II
- Improved pipe whip design
- Combines the dry containment (PWR-type) with the typical BWR-pressure suppression type containment

== Advantages ==
- One advantage of the BWR design (compared to PWR) is improved load-following by virtue of control rod manipulation combined with changing the recirculation flow rate. The integration of the turbine pressure regulator and control system with the recirculation flow control system allows automatic power changes of up to 25% of rated power without altering control rod settings.
- Bottom-entry bottom-mounted control rods allow refueling without removal of the control rods and drives, while also allowing drive testing with an open vessel prior to fuel loading.
- BWR allow lower primary coolant flow than PWR.
- Jet pumps internal to the reactor vessel provide 2/3rds of the recirculation flow, allowing the external recirculation flow loop to be small and compact compared to contemporary PWR designs.
- Under loss of coolant jet pumps provide 10% power similar to boilers.
- BWR designs operate constantly at about half the primary system pressure of PWR designs while producing the same quantity and quality of steam in a compact system: 1020 psi (7 MPa) reactor vessel pressure, and 288 °C temperature for BWR which is lower than 2240 psi (14.4 MPa) and 326 °C for PWR.
- Steam is generated in the reactor pressure vessel in a BWR, whereas it is generated in the steam generator on a second loop in a PWR.
- BWR allows for bulk boiling while PWR doesn't.

== Disadvantages ==
- Steam generated in a BWR contains trace amounts of radioactive materials, as a result, large portions of the Turbine Building are compartmentalized to prevent radiation exposure to workers. PWR Turbine Buildings, on the other hand, are essentially the same as a fossil fuel power plant's Turbine Building with all equipment accessible at all times.
- The Mark I containment was undersized in the original design; the Nuclear Regulatory Commission's Harold Denton estimated a 90% probability of explosive failure if the pressure containment system were ever needed in a severe accident. This design flaw may have been the reason that the tsunami in 2011 led to explosions and fire in Fukushima Daiichi nuclear disaster.

== See also ==
- Nuclear power
- Generation I reactor
- Generation II reactor
- Generation III reactor
- Nuclear safety in the U.S.
- Economics of new nuclear power plants
- Pressurized water reactor
- Reduced moderation water reactor
- Advanced Heavy Water Reactor
- Other Gen III+ designs:
  - AP1000
  - EPR
  - US-APWR
  - ACR
  - Kerena boiling water reactor
