= Vallecitos Nuclear Center =

Nuclear power plant

Coordinates: 37°36′47.76″N 121°50′24.59″W

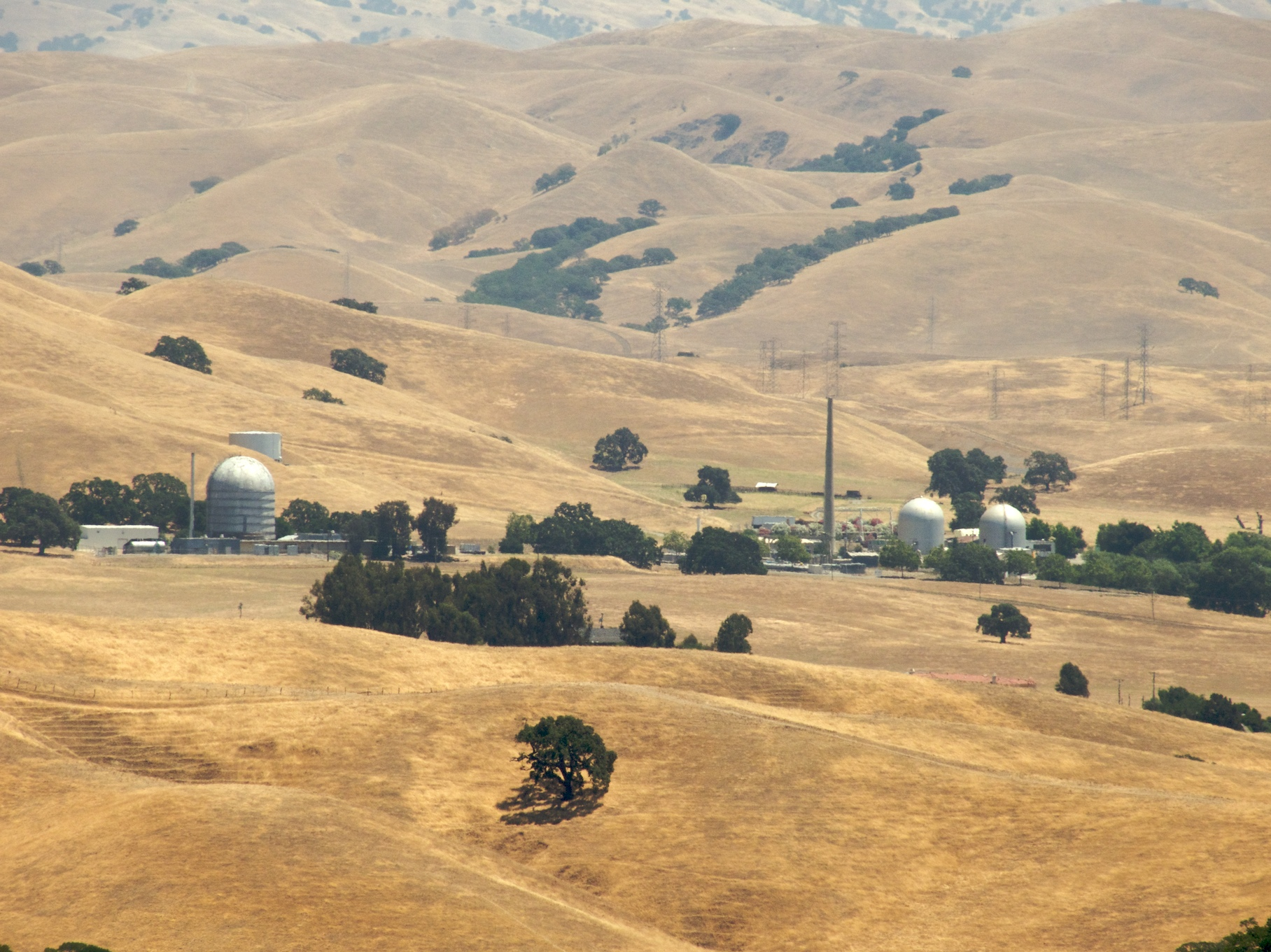
Vallecitos Nuclear Center viewed from Pleasanton Ridge Regional Park

The Vallecitos Nuclear Center is a nuclear research facility, and the site of a former GE Vernova Hitachi Nuclear Energy electricity-generating nuclear power plant in unincorporated Alameda County, California, United States. The facility is approximately 30 miles (48 km) east of San Francisco, under jurisdiction of the US Nuclear Regulatory Commission's Region IV.

The Vallecitos boiling water reactor (VBWR) was the first privately owned and operated nuclear power plant to deliver significant quantities of electricity to a public utility grid. During the period October 1957 to December 1963, it delivered approximately 40,000 megawatt-hours of electricity. This reactor—a light-water moderated and cooled, enriched uranium reactor using stainless steel-clad, plate-type fuel—was a pilot plant and test bed for fuel, core components, controls, and personnel training for the Dresden Nuclear Power Plant, a Commonwealth Edison station built in Illinois five years later.

The plant was originally a collaborative effort of General Electric and Pacific Gas and Electric Company, with Bechtel Corporation serving as engineering contractor. Samuel Untermyer II, the General Electric engineer responsible for the initial design of the VBWR, had performed much of the conceptual research at Argonne National Laboratory while conducting heat transfer and nuclear physics experiments, including the BORAX experiments. Vallecitos Power Plant held the US Atomic Energy Commission's "Power Reactor License No. 1". The main power generating facilities closed in 1963. The discovery of an active fault running beneath the facility led to the closure of its most productive reactors in 1977.

The Vallecitos site includes the Radioactive Materials Laboratory where post-irradiation examinations were carried out. A small 100-kilowatt research reactor called the "Nuclear Test Reactor" (NTR, NRC License R-33) was the last operational reactor at the site. It utilized U-AL alloy fuel, and was used for nondestructive material imaging. Vallecitos also fabricated radioactive source materials used in medicine and industry, under a license issued by the State of California. In May 2023, GE Hitachi announced the cessation of operations at the Vallecitos Nuclear Center with the intent of transferring ownership of the site to NorthStar Group Services for overall decommissioning.

In 2026, Zeno Power Systems, Inc. announced that it would restore hot cells at Vallecitos Nuclear Center for use in the production of radioisotope power systems (RPS) for use in extreme environments, including the deep sea and outer space.
