= Turbine trip =

Automatic shutdown of power generation turbine

A turbine trip is the automatic safety shutdown of a power-generation turbine due to unexpected events. Due to the number of issues that may cause a trip, they are relatively common events. The term is common in both coal and nuclear power generation.

Many events can cause a turbine trip, including:

- turbine overspeed condition where the turbine accelerates over its design speed, typically by 10%
- low vacuum in the secondary cooling loop, or condenser
- lubrication failure for any number of reasons
- vibrations due to any number of issues

In order to trip the turbine, inlet steam must be removed from the feed. This is normally accomplished with dump valves that re-route the feed steam from the turbine inlet directly into the condensers.
