= Thermal limits (nuclear) =

Effects of thermal limits on nuclear operations

Thermal limits are among the most important constraints in nuclear reactor core operations. They are derived within the calculations of fuel reload cycles to define the maximum power output a reactor core can sustain while maintaining the integrity of its fuel and ensuring stable operation. These limits are calculated from the interactions between heat, neutron flux, and component material properties within the core. If exceeded, they can lead to overheating, fuel damage, and operational disruptions that compromise the plant’s license to operate.

== Significance ==
Ensuring that a reactor operates within its prescribed thermal limits is a challenge repeated each fuel cycle, requiring accurate predictions of core behavior based on regularly updated data. The difference between design projections and real-world performance can lead to significant operational inefficiencies. If a reactor is forced to operate below its intended power level due to overly conservative limits, costly fuel may be wasted. On the other hand, the risk of fuel failure increases if limits are too lenient or incorrectly modeled.

The primary function of thermal limits is to prevent conditions that might compromise fuel integrity. The fuel cladding, which acts as the first barrier against radioactive release, must remain intact. This is achieved by restricting the power output of fuel rods to prevent localized overheating.

A second critical function is ensuring core stability. Heat distribution across the reactor core must remain balanced to prevent localized hot spots, which could accelerate material degradation.

Operational efficiency is also dependent on well-calibrated limits. If a reactor can operate closer to its true maximum capability without unnecessary restrictions, it can generate more energy while maintaining safety margins.

Thermal limits also play a role in transient management, helping to account for the time delay between neutron flux changes and corresponding thermal responses in the reactor. This delay can last six to seven seconds and must be considered to prevent thermal instabilities.

Finally, compliance with thermal limits is a regulatory requirement. Nuclear safety agencies mandate continuous monitoring and adjustments to ensure reactors operate within prescribed thresholds. Violating these limits can lead to penalties, operational shutdowns, and significant financial losses.

== Types of thermal limits ==
Thermal limits are categorized based on the scope of power regulation. Global power distribution limits control the overall power output of the reactor, ensuring that its total energy generation does not exceed safe parameters. Local power distribution limits, by contrast, focus on specific regions of the core, preventing individual fuel assemblies from overheating due to localized power peaking. Both types of limits must be carefully managed to balance overall reactor performance.

== Factors affecting thermal limits ==
Calculating thermal limits depends on multiple physical parameters influencing the ability of the reactor to safely dissipate heat. Coolant flow rate and temperature are among the most direct factors; they determine how effectively heat is transferred out of the fuel. The design and materials of the fuel rods also affects how heat is generated and conducted. The reactor’s type and configuration—whether it is a pressurized water reactor, a boiling water reactor, or a different design—further influence thermal limits calculations. Additionally, the specific operating conditions of the plant, including pressure and control rod positions, alter how power is distributed and where constraints must be placed.

== Fine-tuning ==
Thermal limits are not static values; they require continuous refinement for fuel reload design optimization. Improvements in calculation methods allow engineers to reduce unnecessary safety margins without increasing risk - specifically reducing the risk of fuel failure and radioactive release. More precise thermal limits translate to greater efficiency, as fuel is used more effectively. This is particularly important in modern reactors, where thermal efficiency can approach 40%. Fine-tuned limits also improve transient response, ensuring that the reactor remains stable during load-following operations or unexpected changes in demand.

== Calculation methods ==
=== Traditional calculation methods ===
Predicting thermal limits has historically relied on three-dimensional neutronics models which simulate how power, coolant behavior, and flow distributions interact within the reactor core. These models serve as the basis for offline calculations to estimate operating limits before the reactor begins its cycle. Unfortunately, these methods introduce inherent uncertainties because offline calculations are based on theoretical approximations. They cannot perfectly match real-world conditions. On the other hand, online methods use real-time data from in-core instrumentation to adjust thermal limits dynamically. Marrying the difference between these two approaches has long been a challenge in reactor cycle planning, as offline estimates frequently fail to match online performance.

Conventional thermal limit calculations use statistical uncertainty factors to ensure conservatism. Important data sources include real-time reactor conditions such as percent rated power, percent rated flow, inlet moderator temperature, core pressure, and control blade positions that track reactivity and localized power peaking thermal margins in the form of Critical Power Ratio (CPR), Maximum Average Planar Linear Heat Generation Rate (MAPLHGR), and Maximum Fraction of Linear Power Density (MFLPD). These data points are compared against pre-determined operating limits to assess how much margin remains before exceeding safe thresholds. The inability of traditional methods to fully reconcile offline and online estimates often results in either excess conservatism or operational problems.

=== Advanced computational techniques ===
Recent advances in computational modeling have introduced more sophisticated approaches to thermal limit prediction. One emerging method involves machine learning, which uses historical fuel cycle data and core simulation results to improve offline estimates. By analyzing past reactor performance, these models create surrogate predictions that better match real-time conditions. A deep neural network trained using both theoretical and observed data can correct for the systematic errors inherent in offline calculations.

Beyond machine learning, probabilistic modeling techniques are now used to refine uncertainty estimates. These approaches distinguish between variations that occur across the entire core, those that occur on a specific plate, and those that occur at an individual spot. Engineers can achieve more accurate predictions of thermal behavior by accounting for these different levels of variability.

Multiphysics simulations represent another major advancement. Instead of focusing on single aspects of reactor physics, multiphysics models integrate neutron transport, heat conduction, and fluid dynamics into a unified framework. This offers a more detailed understanding of how power and heat interact within the reactor core.

=== Artificial intelligence ===
The integration of artificial intelligence is changing how thermal limits are managed. AI-based optimization methods allow for more efficient reactor core designs, adjusting parameters dynamically to achieve better performance without sacrificing safety. Rapid evaluations of thousands of core configurations can be made by machine learning-based multiphysics emulators to significantly reduce computational time.

AI tools which work with real-time reactor data are also being deployed by nuclear fuel engineers. These systems identify patterns that may indicate changes in thermal behavior by continuously analyzing sensor data. For example, utilities such as Constellation Energy have implemented AI monitoring systems that detect anomalies in sensor readings, allowing operators to make adjustments before thermal limits are exceeded. The growing role of AI in nuclear engineering is expected to improve predictive accuracy which would directly reduce operational costs.

== Regulatory oversight ==
Nuclear regulators such as the United States' Nuclear Regulatory Commission impose strict requirements on thermal limit compliance. Reactor operators must carefully monitor core conditions to ensure that power levels remain within approved margins. If regulated thermal limits are exceeded, these agencies can impose significant penalties, including fines and forced shutdowns. A reactor taken offline for safety violations can incur substantial financial losses, making compliance a serious matter of both safety and economic necessity.
