= Lopa =

Lopa may refer to:

- Layers of protection analysis, a risk management technique
- Loss-of-pressure-control accident, a mode of failure for a nuclear reactor
- LoPa, common abbreviation for Finnish football club Lohjan Pallo
- Layout-Passenger Accommodation, industry term for airline seat
- Lopa (fly), a genus in family Coelopidae
- Lopa County, in Imatong State, South Sudan
- Lopa language, a Kainji language spoken in Nigeria

== People ==
- Baharuddin Lopa (1935–2001), Indonesian minister and attorney general
- Dmytro Lopa (born 1988), Ukrainian football midfielder
- Lopa Patel, British digital entrepreneur
