= Pressure tank =

Tank used in a water system to maintain pressure

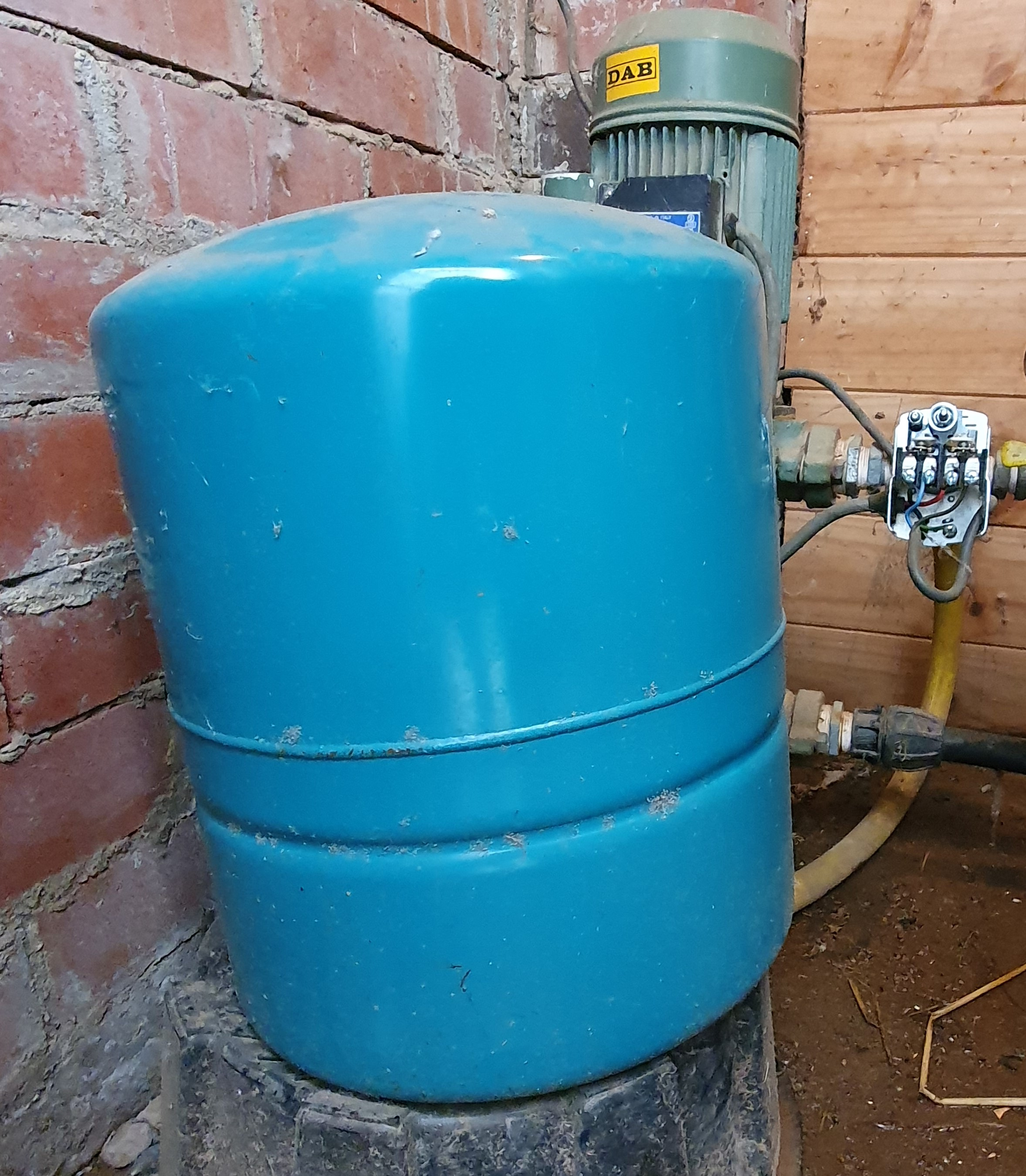
A diaphragm type pressurizer on a domestic rainwater system, with the pump and Square D pressure switch in the background

A pressure tank or pressurizer is a type of hydraulic accumulator used in a piping system to maintain a desired pressure. Applications include buffering water pressure in homes.

== A simple well water control system ==
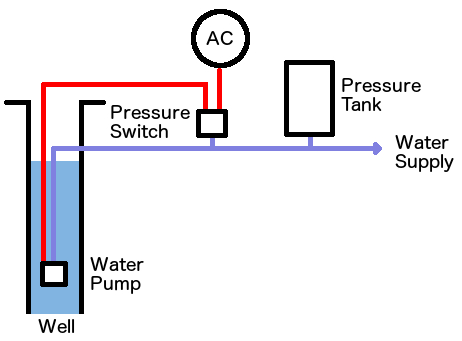
A simple control system for a water well

Referring to the figure on the left, a submersible water pump is installed in a well. The pressure switch turns the water pump on when it senses a pressure that is less than P_{lo} and turns it off when it senses a pressure greater than P_{hi}. While the pump is on, the pressure tank fills up. The pressure tank is then depleted as it supplies water in the specified pressure range to prevent "short-cycling", in which the pump tries to establish the proper pressure by rapidly cycling between P_{lo} and P_{hi}.

A simple pressure tank would be just a tank which held water with an air space above the water which would compress as more water entered the tank. Modern systems isolate the water from the pressurized air using a flexible rubber or plastic diaphragm or bladder, because otherwise the air will dissolve in the water and be removed from the tank by usage. Eventually there will be little or no air and the tank will become "waterlogged" causing short-cycling, and will need to be drained to restore operation. The diaphragm or bladder may itself exert a pressure on the water, but it is usually small and will be neglected in the following discussion.

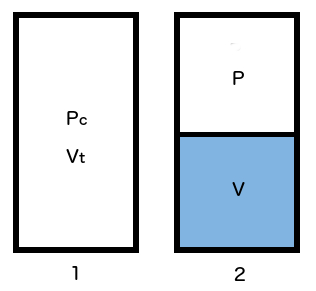
Case 1 is an empty tank at the charging pressure P_{c} (gauge). The total volume of the tank is V_{t}. Case 2 is a tank in use, with the air pressure at pressure P (gauge) and a water volume of V

Referring to the diagram on the right, a pressure tank is generally pressurized when empty with a "charging pressure" P_{c}, which is usually about 2 psi below the turn-on pressure P_{lo} (Case 1). The total volume of the tank is V_{t}. When in use, the air in the tank will be compressed to pressure P and there will be a volume V of water in the tank (Case 2). In the following development, all pressures are gauge pressures, which are the pressures above atmospheric pressure (P_{a}, which is altitude dependent). The ideal gas law may be written for both cases, and the amount of air in each case is equal:

$$(P_\text{c}+P_\text{a})V_\text{t} = NkT \qquad \text{Case 1}$$
$$(P+P_\text{a})(V_\text{t}-V) = NkT \qquad \mathrm{Case 2}$$

where N is the number of molecules of gas (equal in both cases), k is the Boltzmann constant and T is the temperature. Assuming that the temperature is equal for both cases, the above equations can be solved for the water pressure/volume relationship in the tank:

$$V(P) = V_\text{t}\frac{P-P_\text{c}}{P+P_\text{a}}$$
$$P(V) = \frac{P_\text{a} V+P_\text{c} V_\text{t}}{V_\text{t}-V}$$

Tanks are generally specified by their total volume V_{t} and the "drawdown" (ΔV), which is the amount of water the tank will eject as the tank pressure goes from P_{hi} to P_{lo}, which are established by the pressure switch:

$$\Delta V = V(P_\text{hi}) - V(P_\text{lo}) = V_\text{t} \frac{(P_\text{a}+P_\text{c})(P_\text{hi}-P_\text{lo})}{(P_\text{hi}+P_\text{a})(P_\text{lo}+P_\text{a})}$$

The reason for the charging pressure can now be seen: The larger the charging pressure, the larger the drawdown. However, a charging pressure above P_{lo} will not allow the pump to turn on when the water pressure is below P_{lo}, so it is kept a bit below P_{lo}. Another important parameter is the drawdown factor (f_{ΔV}), which is the ratio of the drawdown to the total tank volume:

$$f_{\Delta V}= \frac{(P_\text{a}+P_\text{c})(P_\text{hi}-P_\text{lo})}{(P_\text{hi}+P_\text{a})(P_\text{lo}+P_\text{a})}$$

This factor is independent of the tank size so that the drawdown can be calculated for any tank, given its total volume, atmospheric pressure, charging pressure, and the limiting pressures established by the pressure switch.

== See also ==
- Pressurizer (nuclear power) – device to prevent coolant in nuclear reactor from boiling

== Bibliography ==
- Calder, N. (2005). Boatowner's Mechanical and Electrical Manual: How to Maintain, Repair, and Improve Your Boat's Essential Systems. McGraw-Hill Education. ISBN 978-0-07-178406-1.
