= Core shroud =

Steel cylinder surrounding a nuclear reactor core

A core shroud is a stainless steel cylinder surrounding a nuclear reactor core whose main function is to direct the cooling water flow. The nuclear reactor core is where the nuclear reactions take place. Because the reactions are exothermic, cool water is needed to prevent the reactor core from melting down. The core shroud helps by directing this cool water towards the reactor core, providing stability to the nuclear reactions.

== Structure ==
The core shroud is composed of multiple cylindrical thermal shields stacked on top of each other. In between each thermal shield is a horizontal, stainless steel cylindrical plate that helps keep the thermal shields in place. The plates are then welded together with the thermal shields so that they create one solid structure. Vertical tie bolts are then used to reinforce each horizontal plate with their adjacent thermal shields, stabilizing the cylindrical core shroud. The thermal shields are needed because the core shroud exists near the nuclear reactor core where heat is constantly present. The thermal shields prevent heat from damaging the core shroud by absorbing or reflecting the heat.

Core shroud walls are relatively thin, ranging from three to five centimeters in thickness. This is because the core shroud is not built to withstand high amounts of pressure for long periods of time, so thicker walls would be unnecessary for the core shroud's function.

== Function ==
=== Direction of Water Flow ===
The main function of the core shroud is to direct the current of water flow inside of the reactor pressure vessel. Cold water is pumped into the reactor pressure vessel from an outside water source. The cold water flows down in between the wall of the reactor pressure vessel and the outside wall of the core shroud where it meets the fuel assemblies. It is here that the cold water is heated, and the heated water flows back up the gap between the wall of the reactor pressure vessel and the outside wall of the core shroud. This creates steam, since the water is heated, which is then used to drive the steam turbine, which powers the generator and creates electricity. By directing the cold water into the reactor pressure vessel, and allowing the heated water to rise and evaporate, the core shroud will have successfully cooled the nuclear reactions.

=== Water Level ===
In order for the reactor core to remain cool, water is sometimes needed in greater amount, resulting in a flood like effect in the reactor vessel itself. The core shroud must be able to maintain its strength when the vessel floods so that the reactor core does not melt down. The core shroud must be built to withstand the pressure of extra water because should it collapse, the fuel assemblies would not be able to cool properly.

== Maintenance ==
In 1990, Stress Corrosion Cracking (SCC) was discovered in core shrouds, resulting in a heightened awareness of core shroud maintenance. Routine core shroud inspections became mandatory in most nuclear power plants worldwide because if a core shroud were to collapse, a nuclear meltdown could occur.

Core shrouds crack because the heat from the nuclear reactions combined with the constant flowing water eventually wear out the steel plates. One method used to fix this problem is reinforcing the core shroud plates. This is done using an anchor bolt, which is used to attach additional steel plates to the core shroud surface, thereby reinforcing the structure. This is the most common method used to fix cracks in the core shroud since it is easy and relatively safe. Replacement of the core shroud is also an option, but it is not recommended because the cracked plates must be removed manually, leaving the laborers susceptible to radiation.

In the Fukushima Daiichi nuclear disaster, cracks had been discovered in their core shrouds. In this specific event, however, core shroud cracking was not the cause of the nuclear disaster. Several other factors, such as the earthquake, tsunami, and equipment failures, caused the most damage to the nuclear power plant. It has been speculated that if a core shroud were to collapse due to cracking, it could result in a catastrophic nuclear meltdown.
