= Westinghouse TR-2 =

Retired research and test reactor

The TR-2 nuclear reactor, also known as the Westinghouse Test Reactor or Westinghouse Testing Reactor (WTR) was a small research and test reactor designed and manufactured by Westinghouse Electric Corporation at their Waltz Mill site near Madison, Pennsylvania, approximately 30 miles southeast of Pittsburgh. TR-2 was the first privately owned research and test reactor. The reactor suffered an accident which involved severe fuel damage in 1960.

== Design ==
TR-2 was a heterogeneous, low pressure, low temperature, light water cooled and moderated, pressurized water reactor. The primary function of the reactor was to test reactor materials and components. Rather than incorporating an electrically-heated pressurizer vessel as is common in commercial PWRs designed since the 1960s, TR-2 relied on the static water pressure delivered by a tank of water, known as the head tank, which was elevated high above the ground and connected to the reactor vessel by piping. Heat generated by the reactor was transferred to heat exchangers for ultimate heat rejection to the environment via a mechanical draft cooling tower. The reactor was initially permitted to operate at up to 20 Megawatts thermal, though it was designed and constructed to permit eventual operation at a power level of 60 thermal megawatts. Positions for experimental capsules, test loops, and fuel experiments were included in the reactor design; as was a neutron beam port. On January 8, 1960, the Atomic Energy Commission (AEC) issued Amendment 1 to the facility license to permit operation at up to 60 Megawatts thermal.

The reactor was housed inside a structure known as the vapor container, referred to in some literature as a containment structure, which was designed to contain fission products that might be released from the reactor during an accident. The vapor containment was a metal right cylinder approximately 74 feet tall above the surrounding ground level and 70 feet in interior diameter. The top of the vapor container was slightly rounded. There were two airlocks to the vapor container.

A mechanical ventilation system was provided to the process water surge tank and the process water head tank which was elevated almost 250 feet above the ground on a metal support frame approximately 500 feet east of the vapor container. Forced air swept over the surge tank, removing the gasses normally produced during reactor operation, and was then routed to the head tank where the gasses were released via a vent about 250 feet above the surrounding ground level.

The stainless steel reactor vessel was 32 feet tall and 8 feet in diameter, with 1-inch-thick walls. The rector vessel was oriented vertically and surrounded by concrete for radiation shielding. Fuel elements were loaded and removed via a diagonal tube that extended from mid-height of the reactor vessel down to a water-filled transfer canal which connected the vapor shell to the surrounding facility buildings.

Typical for a research and test reactor, it did not produce electricity.

The test reactor was located in the northwest portion of the developed area of the larger Waltz Mill site. The reactor was located on the east side of Waltz Mill Road, approximately 2,300 feet north of the present intersection of Waltz Mill Road and Interstate 70.

== Fuel ==
The TR-2 core consisted of cylindrical fuel elements. The fuel elements were mechanical assemblies including multiple individual aluminum fuel tubes which contained the uranium fuel; some fuel elements included other reactor instrumentation or experiment components in addition to the fuel tubes. Each fuel assembly had 200 grams of highly enriched uranium fuel as an aluminum-uranium alloy in the walls of three long concentric cylinders around a central aluminum mandrel tube in which small canned specimens could be irradiated. The uranium-aluminum fuel alloy was aluminum clad: cladding thickness was 36 mils; the fuel alloy, 52 mils. The fuel tubes were 44 inches long and the outside diameter of the fuel assembly was 2.5 inches. Orifices at both ends distributed the coolant flow through the channels within the assembly and provided some of the static pressure required on the fuel assemblies to prevent boiling at the hot spots.

The AEC allocated to Westinghouse for use in the operation of the facility 156 kilograms of uranium-235 contained in highly enriched uranium (HEU) enriched to approximately 93% in the isotope uranium-235.

== History ==
Westinghouse applied for a Construction Permit from the AEC on February 29, 1956. Construction Permit No. CPRR-8 (henceforth designated CPTR-l) was Issued by the AEC on July 3, 1957. The AEC issued Facility License Number TR-2 on June 19, 1959.

TR-2 reached criticality for the first time in July 1959. The primary use of the reactor was to test metallic and non-metallic materials for suitability and performance in a high neutron nuclear environment, as well as to test the performance of new fuel designs, for many commercial, academic, and government customers.

The reactor experienced an accident resulting in fuel damage in 1960. After a restart following the 1960 accident, the reactor was retired in 1962 due to low customer demand. On March 25, 1963, the facility license was amended to allow only possession of special nuclear material but not reactor operation.

The minimally radioactive reactor vessel was shipped from the site on May 15, 2000 for dismantling and ultimate disposal. Westinghouse removed the TR-2 vapor shell in the spring of 2012.

== 1960 accident ==
A partial core meltdown occurred at the reactor on the evening of Sunday, April 3, 1960. One fuel element melted, releasing the radioactive gaseous fission products krypton and xenon. The overheating and subsequent damage to the fuel element is reported to have caused by a local lack of sufficient coolant flow. The accident was rated a 4 on the International Nuclear Event Scale, an Accident with local consequences.

The first notification to the AEC of the accident was provided by a telephone call from Westinghouse to the AEC New York Operations Office. In a follow-up letter report, Westinghouse stated, "High activity in the primary coolant and high radiation levels on the site caused shutdown of the WTR and evacuation of the site at approximately 8:50 p.m. on April 3, 1960. Indications are that the high levels were caused by fuel element failure."

A planned reduced coolant flow experiment was in progress at the time of the accident; a five-week long shutdown for reactor modifications was planned to start at 12:01 a.m. the following day. Around 7:55 p.m. Eastern Time, the reactor coolant flow was reduced gradually to 5,250 gpm with the reactor operating at 30 megawatts. In the 8:00 p.m. hour, reactor power was raised to 37 megawatts, and operators commanded an increase in power to 40 megawatts. At 8:35 p.m., reactor power rapidly dropped to 17 megawatts, even as control rods were automatically withdrawing from the core. After reaching 17 megawatts, reactor power dramatically increased to 38 megawatts. At 8:40 p.m., the first of numerous radiation monitors throughout the facility began alarming on high radiation readings. The reactor was manually scrammed four minutes later at 8:44 p.m.

Immediately after the reactor was tripped, facility workers were ordered to evacuate to a nearby guardhouse, then a Westinghouse-owned guest house approximately 1/3 of a mile southeast of the reactor, as radiation levels continued to rise. Three radiation monitoring teams with air monitors and Geiger counters departed the facility to monitor the surrounding environment. At the time of the accident, winds were blowing at 3 mph to 5 mph out of the northeast, drizzling rain was in progress, and the sun had long set. The radiation levels observed at the main road directly in front of the site were over 20 millirem/hour (for comparison, a typical medical X-ray procedure is 10 to 100 millirem). No contamination of the environment was identified by the surveys the night of April 3. Radiation levels inside and outside the reactor facility decreased over the following hours; personnel made their first re-entries into the facility in the early morning hours of Monday, April 4, 1960.

== Atomic Energy Commission investigation ==
The AEC opened an investigation into the accident once the extent of damage became known. Members of the AEC staff held a meeting with Westinghouse at the Waltz Mill site on April 22, 1960. In an April 27 memo, AEC Inspection Specialist V. A. Walker was highly critical of Westinghouse and the reactor management and staff. Walker specifically criticized the lack of candor by Westinghouse personnel during the investigation meeting. He also found that the written test instructions and reactor operating procedures were not detailed in regard to actions to take if abnormal conditions were encountered during the test, such as the unexpected reactor power drop experienced. Walker concluded his memo with the summary, "In general, I think the WTR is not well-managed and that the aggressiveness they have exhibited in developing reactor technology has been misdirected. The latter condition can be attributed in part to the tests that have been performed elsewhere."

On May 27, 1960, the AEC issued the thirteen page report CF-169 regarding the accident. The report provides a detailed account of the events of the accident. Notably, the report concludes that all of the radiation values recorded by the Westinghouse staff immediately following the accident, including an observation of 200 millirem/hour at the plant gate around 9:00 p.m., was direct gamma radiation from the elevated head tank, which contained released fission products. The dose rate at two meters from the head tank piping radiation monitor (the monitor was at ground level, well below the elevated head tank) was 5000 millirem/hour. Radioactive fission product gasses Xenon-133-135, Argon-41, and Krypton-85 were released through the 250 feet tall exhaust stack which served the facility. This report reiterated no contamination was found outside of the facility structures and equipment. The report did not provide a definitive cause for the accident while noting local low flow perturbations of the coolant past the fuel element, debris blocking flow past the fuel element, and a number of fuel element manufacturing defects (e.g. aluminum cladding to uranium bonding) were viewed as the most likely causes by the Westinghouse investigating team. The final Westinghouse report issued July 7, 1960 concluded that the immediate cause of the accident could not be conclusively determined, but that a pre-existing defect in the subject fuel element was the most likely cause.

Subsequent reports and correspondence discussed the impact of the accident on future reactor containment design considerations. TR-2 was constructed with a vapor shell or containment to prevent fission products from escaping to the environment during an accident. However, the design and operation of the ventilation system serving various process water tanks allowed fission gasses to escape to the environment, circumventing the containment barrier via plant components, what is known as a "containment bypass" event.

== 1960 accident recovery and cleanup ==
One fuel element melted into two pieces with several inches completely missing compared to the pre-accident height. By April 18, 1960 the upper portion of the melted fuel element had been removed from the reactor, the lower portion of the fuel assembly and debris remained. The melted fuel assembly was sawed out of the reactor vessel from April 21 to April 25. Circulation of the reactor coolant loops during and after the accident distributed core debris throughout the system and required much manual labor to remove the debris, in addition to the use of filters and ion exchangers.

TR-2 remained shut down for eight months to clean-up the facility and repair and refuel the reactor. Labor for the cleanup largely consisted of Westinghouse employees and local unemployed coal miners. Cleanup was performed while wearing common industrial protective equipment using household cleaning and sanitary products. No injuries or illnesses resulted from the accident or cleanup.

Two million gallons of contaminated water were generated during the accident and cleanup. Contaminated water was pumped from the reactor to three lined retention basins/lagoons via a pipeline. Leaks developed in the lagoons, a condition which eventually led to detectable ^{90}Sr in groundwater plus contaminated soil.

The accident and cleanup did not generate much public reaction or media coverage at the time. The in-state Philadelphia Inquirer carried only a two paragraph bulletin from United Press International.

== Current site ==
The former facilities were removed and legacy contamination from the routine operations of the reactor and the 1960 accident were remediated to the satisfaction of the Pennsylvania Bureau of Radiation Protection by July 2013.

The Nuclear Regulatory Commission terminated the facility operating license for the TR-2 facility on September 19, 2008; TR-2 was included in NRC Docket 050-00022 and NRC Docket 070-00698.

== See also ==
- List of nuclear reactors
- List of nuclear research reactors
