= Reactor pressure vessel =

Nuclear power plant component

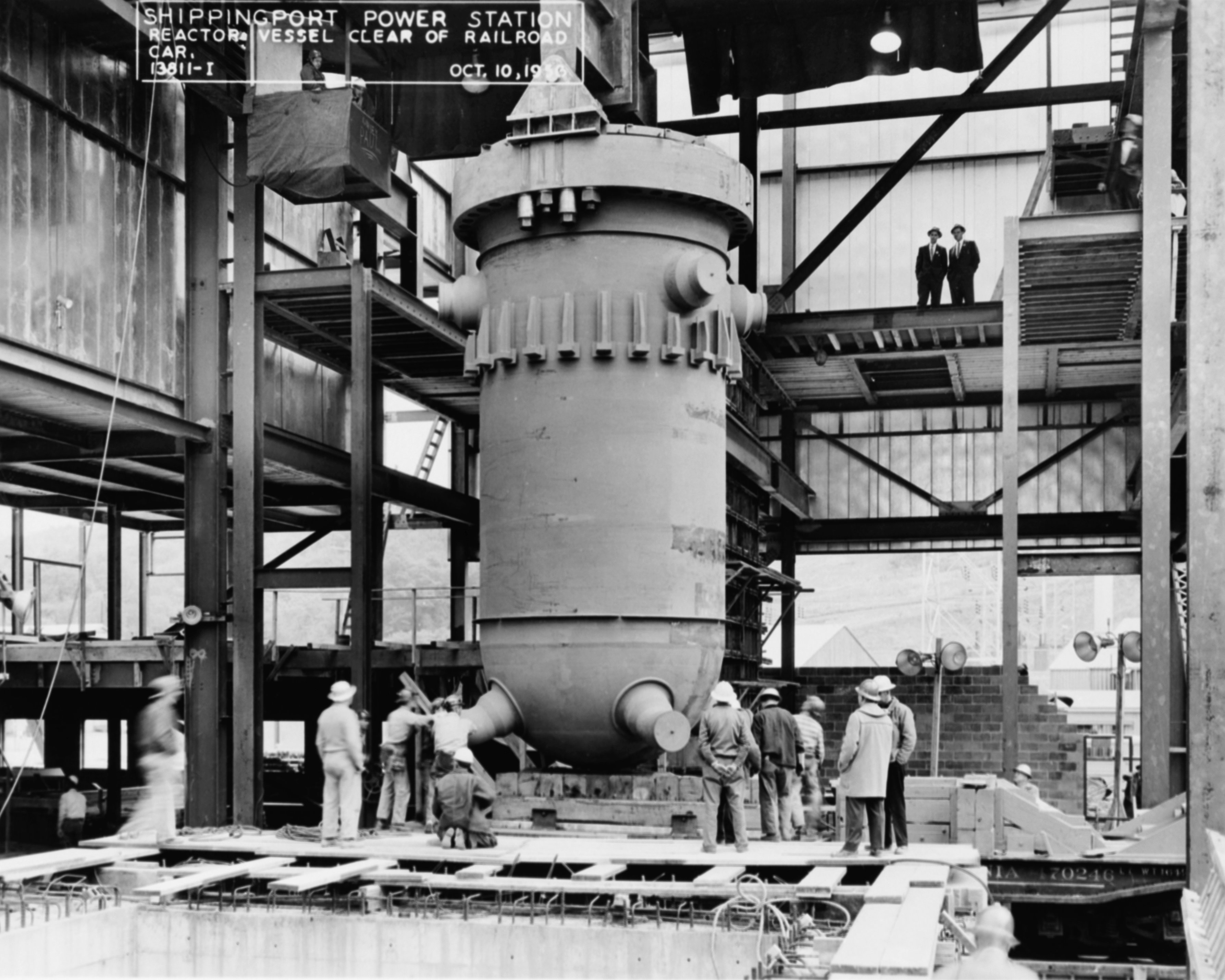
The reactor vessel used in the first US commercial nuclear power plant, the Shippingport Atomic Power Station. Photo from 1956.

A reactor pressure vessel (RPV) in a nuclear power plant is the pressure vessel containing the nuclear reactor coolant, core shroud, and the reactor core.

== Classification of nuclear power reactors ==
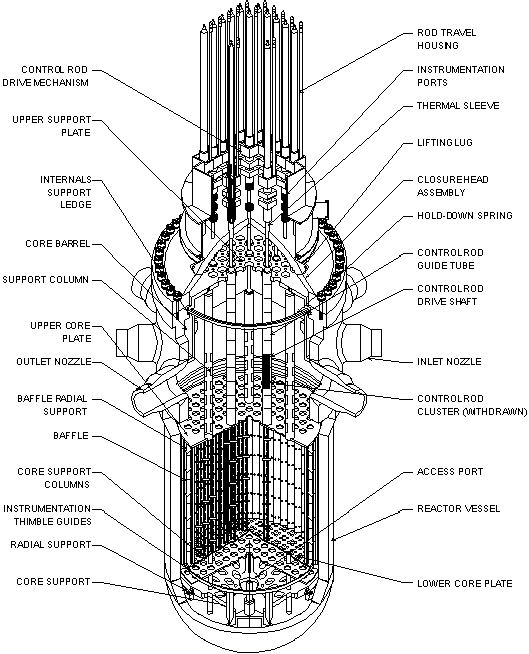
A typical RPV

Russian Soviet era RBMK reactors have each fuel assembly enclosed in an individual 8 cm diameter pipe rather than having a pressure vessel. Whilst most power reactors do have a pressure vessel, they are generally classified by the type of coolant rather than by the configuration of the vessel used to contain the coolant. The classifications are:

- Light-water reactor - Includes the pressurized water reactor and the boiling water reactor. Most nuclear power reactors are of this type.
- Graphite-moderated reactor - Includes the Chernobyl reactor (RBMK), which has a highly unusual reactor configuration compared to the vast majority of civilian nuclear power plants in Russia and around the world.
- Gas cooled thermal reactor - Includes the Advanced Gas-cooled Reactor, the gas cooled fast breeder reactor, and the high temperature gas cooled reactor. An example of a gas cooled reactor is the British Magnox.
- Pressurized heavy-water reactor - utilizes heavy water, or water with a higher than normal proportion of the hydrogen isotope deuterium, in some manner. However, D_{2}O (heavy water) is more expensive and may be used as a main component, but not necessarily as a coolant in this case. An example of a heavy water reactor is Canada's CANDU reactor.
- Liquid metal cooled reactor - utilizes a liquid metal, such as sodium or a lead-bismuth alloy to cool the reactor core.
- Molten salt reactor - salts, typically fluorides of the alkali metals and of the alkali earth metals, are used as the coolant. Operation is similar to metal-cooled reactors with high temperatures and low pressures, reducing pressure exerted on the reactor vessel versus water or steam-cooled designs.

Of the main classes of reactor with a pressure vessel, the pressurized water reactor is unique in that the pressure vessel suffers significant neutron irradiation (called fluence) during operation, and may become brittle over time as a result. In particular, the larger pressure vessel of the boiling water reactor is better shielded from the neutron flux, so although more expensive to manufacture in the first place because of this extra size, it has an advantage in not needing annealing to extend its life.

Annealing of pressurized water reactor vessels to extend their working life is a complex technology being actively developed by both nuclear service providers (AREVA) and operators of pressurized water reactors.

== Components of a pressurized water reactor pressure vessel ==
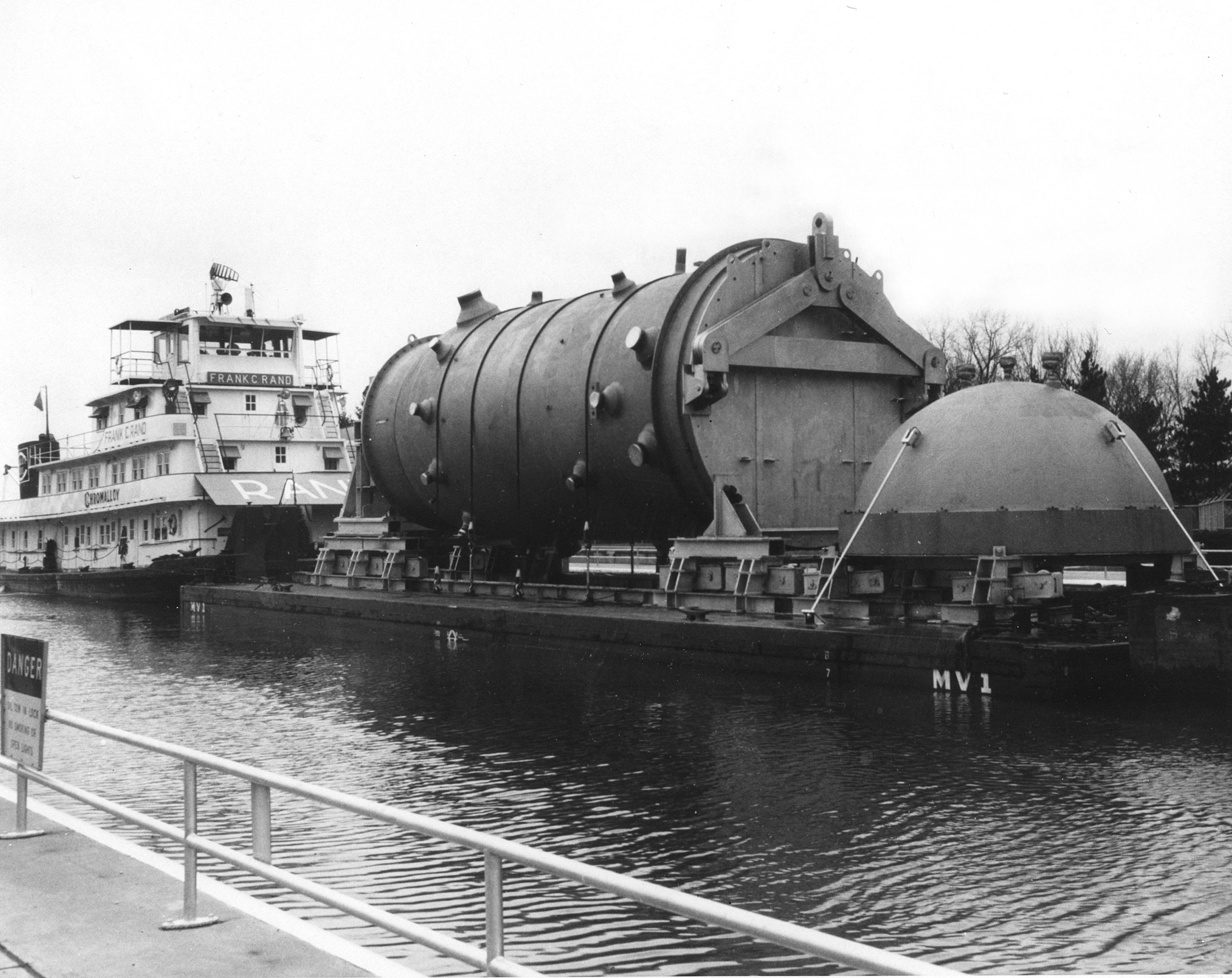
A reactor vessel body and vessel head being shipped to Dresden Generating Station

All pressurized water reactor pressure vessels share some features regardless of the particular design.

=== Reactor vessel body ===
The reactor vessel body is the largest component and is designed to contain the fuel assembly, coolant, and fittings to support coolant flow and support structures. It is usually cylindrical in shape and is open at the top to allow the fuel to be loaded.

=== Reactor vessel head ===
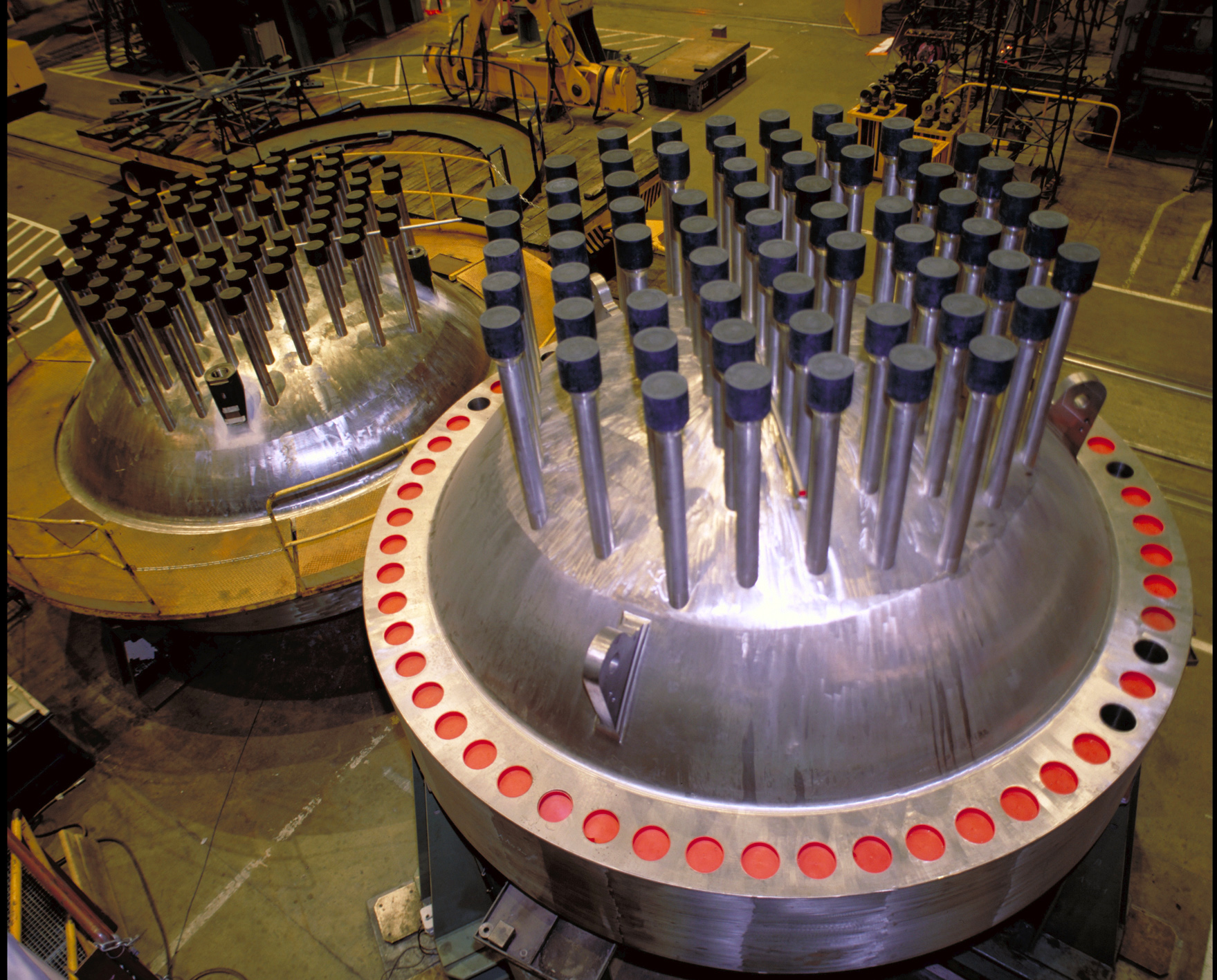
A reactor vessel head for a pressurized water reactor

This structure is attached to the top of the reactor vessel body. It contains penetrations to allow the control rod driving mechanism to attach to the control rods in the fuel assembly. The coolant level measurement probe also enters the vessel through the reactor vessel head.

=== Fuel assembly ===
The fuel assembly of nuclear fuel usually consisting of uranium or uranium–plutonium mixes. It is usually a rectangular block of gridded fuel rods.

=== Neutron reflector or absorber ===
Protecting the inside of the vessel from fast neutrons escaping from the fuel assembly is a cylindrical shield wrapped around the fuel assembly. Reflectors send the neutrons back into the fuel assembly to better utilize the fuel. The main purpose though is to protect the vessel from fast neutron induced damage that can make the vessel brittle and reduce its useful life.

== Materials ==
The RPV provides a critical role in safety of the PWR reactor and the materials used must be able to contain the reactor core at elevated temperatures and pressures. The materials used in the cylindrical shell of the vessels have evolved over time, but in general they consist of low-alloy ferritic steels clad with 3–10 mm of austenitic stainless steel. The stainless steel cladding is primarily used in locations that come into contact with coolant in order to minimize corrosion. Through the mid-1960, SA-302, Grade B, a molybdenum-manganese plate steel, was used in the body of the vessel. As changing designs required larger pressure vessels, the addition of nickel to this alloy by roughly 0.4-0.7 wt% was required to increase the yield strength. Other common steel alloys include SA-533 Grade B Class 1 and SA-508 Class 2. Both materials have main alloying elements of nickel, manganese, molybdenum, and silicon, but the latter also includes 0.25-0.45 wt% chromium. All alloys listed in the reference also have >0.04 wt% sulfur. Low-alloyed NiMoMn ferritic steels are attractive for this purpose due to their high thermal conductivity and low thermal expansion, properties that make them resistant to thermal shock. However, when considering the properties of these steels, one must take into account the response it will have to radiation damage. Due to harsh conditions, the RPV cylinder shell material is often the lifetime-limiting component for a nuclear reactor. Understanding the effects radiation has on the microstructure in addition to the physical and mechanical properties will allow scientists to design alloys more resistant to radiation damage.

In 2018 Rosatom announced it had developed a thermal annealing technique for RPVs which ameliorates radiation damage and extends service life by between 15 and 30 years. This had been demonstrated on unit 1 of the Balakovo Nuclear Power Plant.

=== Radiation damage in metals and alloys ===
Due to the nature of nuclear energy generation, the materials used in the RPV are constantly bombarded by high-energy particles. These particles can either be neutrons or fragments of an atom created by a fission event. When one of these particles collides with an atom in the material, it will transfer some of its kinetic energy and knock the atom out of its position in the lattice. When this happens, this primary "knock-on" atom (PKA) that was displaced and the energetic particle may rebound and collide with other atoms in the lattice. This creates a chain reaction that can cause many atoms to be displaced from their original positions. This atomic movement leads to the creation of many types of defects. The accumulation of various defects can cause microstructural changes that can lead to a degradation in macroscopic properties. As previously mentioned, the chain reaction caused by a PKA often leaves a trail of vacancies and clusters of defects at the edge. This is called a displacement cascade. The vacancy-rich core of a displacement cascade can also collapse into dislocation loops. Due to irradiation, materials tend to develop a higher concentration of defects than is present in typical steels, and the high temperatures of operation induce migration of the defects. This can cause things like recombination of interstitials and vacancies and clustering of like defects, which can either create or dissolve precipitates or voids. Examples of sinks, or thermodynamically favorable places for defects to migrate to, are grain boundaries, voids, incoherent precipitates, and dislocations.

==== Radiation-induced segregation ====
Interactions between defects and alloying elements can cause a redistribution of atoms at sinks such as grain boundaries. The physical effect that can occur is that certain elements will be enriched or depleted in these areas, which often leads to embrittlement of grain boundaries or other detrimental property changes. This is because there is a flux of vacancies towards a sink and a flux of atoms away or toward the sink that may have varying diffusion coefficients. The uneven rates of diffusion cause a concentration of atoms that will not necessarily be in the correct alloy proportions. It has been reported that nickel, copper and silicon tend to be enriched at sinks, whereas chromium tends to be depleted. The resulting physical effect is changing chemical composition at grain boundaries or around voids/incoherent precipitates, which also serve as sinks.

==== Formation of voids and bubbles ====
Voids form due to a clustering of vacancies and generally form more readily at higher temperatures. Bubbles are simply voids filled with gas; they will occur if transmutation reactions are present, meaning a gas is formed due to the breakdown of an atom caused by neutron bombardment. The biggest issue with voids and bubbles is dimensional instability. An example of where this would be very problematic is areas with tight dimensional tolerances, such as threads on a fastener.

==== Irradiation hardening ====
The creation of defects such as voids or bubbles, precipitates, dislocation loops or lines, and defect clusters can strengthen a material because they block dislocation motion. The movement of dislocations is what leads to plastic deformation. While this hardens the material, the downside is that there is a loss of ductility. Losing ductility, or increasing brittleness, is dangerous in RPVs because it can lead to catastrophic failure without warning. When ductile materials fail, there is substantial deformation before failure, which can be monitored. Brittle materials will crack and explode when under pressure without much prior deformation, so there is not much engineers can do to detect when the material is about to fail. A particularly damaging element in steels that can lead to hardening or embrittlement is copper. Cu-rich precipitates are very small (1-3 nm) so they are effective at pinning dislocations. It has been recognized that copper is the dominant detrimental element in steels used for RPVs, especially if the impurity level is greater than 0.1 wt%. Thus, the development of "clean" steels, or ones with very low impurity levels, is important in reducing radiation-induced hardening.

==== Creep ====
Creep occurs when a material is held under levels of stress below their yield stress that causes plastic deformation over time. This is especially prevalent when a material is exposed to high stresses at elevated temperatures, because diffusion and dislocation motion occur more rapidly. Irradiation can cause creep due to the interaction between stress and the development of the microstructure. In this case, the increase in diffusivities due to high temperatures is not a very strong factor for causing creep. The dimensions of the material are likely to increase in the direction of the applied stress due to the creation of dislocation loops around defects that formed due to radiation damage. Furthermore, applied stress can allow interstitials to be more readily absorbed in dislocation, which assists in dislocation climb. When dislocations are able to climb, excess vacancies are left, which can also lead to swelling.

==== Irradiation assisted stress corrosion cracking ====
Due to the embrittlement of grain boundaries or other defects that can serve as crack initiators, the addition of radiation attack at cracks can cause intergranular stress corrosion cracking. The main environmental stressor that forms due to radiation is hydrogen embrittlement at crack tips. Hydrogen ions are created when radiation splits water molecules, which is present because water is the coolant in PWRs, into OH^{−} and H^{+}. There are several suspected mechanisms that explain hydrogen embrittlement, three of which are the decohesion mechanism, the pressure theory, and the hydrogen attack method. In the decohesion mechanism, it is thought that the accumulation of hydrogen ions reduces the metal-to-metal bond strength, which makes it easier to cleave atoms apart. The pressure theory is the idea that hydrogen can precipitate as a gas at internal defects and create bubbles within the material. The stress caused by the expanding bubble in addition to the applied stress is what lowers the overall stress required to fracture the material. The hydrogen attack method is similar to the pressure theory, but in this case it is suspected that the hydrogen reacts with carbon in the steel to form methane, which then forms blisters and bubbles at the surface. In this case, the added stress by the bubbles is enhanced by the decarburization of the steel, which weakens the metal. In addition to hydrogen embrittlement, radiation induced creep can cause the grain boundaries to slide against each other. This destabilizes the grain boundaries even further, making it easier for a crack to propagate along its length.

== Designing radiation-resistant materials for reactor pressure vessels ==
Very aggressive environments require novel materials approaches in order to combat declines in mechanical properties over time. One method researchers have sought to use is introducing features to stabilize displaced atoms. This can be done by adding grain boundaries, oversized solutes, or small oxide dispersants to minimize defect movement. By doing this, there would be less radiation-induced segregation of elements, which would in turn lead to more ductile grain boundaries and less intergranular stress corrosion cracking. Blocking dislocation and defect movement would also help to increase the resistance to radiation assisted creep. Attempts have been reported of instituting yttrium oxides to block dislocation motion, but it was found that technological implementation posed a greater challenge than expected. Further research is required to continue improving the radiation damage resistance of structural materials used in nuclear power plants.

== Manufacturers ==
Because of the extreme requirements needed to build large state-of-the-art reactor pressure vessels and the limited market, as of January 2020 there are only a handful of manufacturers in the world including:

- China's First Heavy Industries, Erzhong Group, Harbin Electric and Shanghai Electric.
- France's Framatome (former Areva)
- Indian conglomerate Larsen & Toubro's subsidiary L&T Special Steels and Heavy Forgings Limited in partnership with Bhabha Atomic Research Centre and NPCIL
- Japan's Japan Steel Works and IHI Corporation (in joint venture with Toshiba, former)
- Russia's United Heavy Machinery (OMZ-Izhora), ZiO-Podolsk and AEM-Atommash Volgodonsk.
- South Korea's Doosan Group.
- United Kingdom: Rolls-Royce plc produces reactors for Royal Navy submarines.

== See also ==
- Nuclear physics
- Nuclear reactor
- Nuclear reactor physics
- Nuclear reactor vessels
- Radiation damage
