= Loss-of-pressure-control accident =

Event where the pressure of confined coolant falls below specification

A loss-of-pressure-control accident (LOPA) is a mode of failure for a nuclear reactor that involves the pressure of the confined coolant falling below specification. Most commercial types of nuclear reactor use a pressure vessel to maintain pressure in the reactor plant. This is necessary in a pressurized water reactor to prevent boiling in the core, which could lead to a nuclear meltdown. This is also necessary in other types of reactor plants to prevent moderators from having uncontrolled properties.

Pressure is controlled in a pressurized water reactor to ensure that the core itself does not reach its boiling point in which the water will turn into steam and rapidly decrease the heat being transferred from the fuel to the moderator. By a combination of heaters and spray valves, pressure is controlled in the pressurizer vessel which is connected to the reactor plant. Because the pressurizer vessel and the reactor plant are connected, the pressure of the steam space pressurizes the entire reactor plant to ensure the pressure is above that which would allow boiling in the reactor core. The pressurizer vessel itself may be maintained much hotter than the rest of the reactor plant to ensure pressure control, because in the liquid throughout the reactor plant, pressure applied at any point has an effect on the entire system, whereas the heat transfer is limited by ambient and other losses.

== Causes of a loss of pressure control ==
Many failures in a reactor plant or its supporting auxiliaries could cause a loss of pressure control, including:

- Inadvertent isolation of the pressurizing vessel from the reactor plant, via the closing of an isolation valve or mechanically clogged piping. Because of this possibility, no commercial nuclear power plant has any kind of valve in the connection between the pressuriser and the reactor coolant circuit. To avoid clogging anywhere in the primary circuit, the coolant is kept very clean, and the connecting pipe between the pressuriser and the reactor coolant circuit is short and large diameter.
- A rupture in the pressurizer vessel, which would also be a loss-of-coolant accident. In most reactor plant designs, however, this would not limit flowrate through the core and therefore would behave like a loss-of-pressure-control-accident rather than a loss-of-coolant accident.
- Failure of either the spray nozzles (failing open would inhibit raising pressure as the relatively cool spray collapses the pressurizer vessel bubble) or the heaters of the pressurizing system.
- Thermal Stratification of the liquid portion of the pressurizer. When the liquid portion of the pressurizer becomes stratified, the lower layers of water (furthest from the steam bubble) are subcooled and as the steam bubble slowly condenses, pressurizer pressure will appear relatively constant but actually will be slowly lowering. When the operator energizes pressurizer heaters to maintain or raise pressure, pressure will continue to drop until the subcooled water is heated up by the pressurizer heaters to the saturation temperature corresponding to the pressure of the steam (bubble) portion of the pressurizer. During this reheating period, pressure control will be lost, since pressure will still be dropping when it is desired to raise pressure.

== Results of a loss of pressure control in a pressurized water reactor ==
When pressure control is lost in a reactor plant, depending on the level of heat being generated by the reactor plant, the heat being removed by the steam or other auxiliary systems, the initial pressure, and the normal operating temperature of the plant, it could take minutes or even hours for operators to see significant trends in core behaviour.

For whatever power level the reactor is currently operating at, a certain amount of enthalpy is present in the coolant. This enthalpy is proportional to temperature, therefore, the hotter the plant, the higher the pressure must be maintained to prevent boiling. When pressure drops to the saturation point, dryout in the coolant channels will occur.

As the reactor heats the water flowing through coolant channels, subcooled nucleate boiling takes place, in which some of the water becomes small bubbles of steam on the cladding of the fuel rods. These are then stripped from the fuel cladding and into the coolant channel by the flow of water. Normally, these bubbles collapse in the channel, transferring enthalpy to the surrounding coolant. When the pressure is below the saturation pressure for the given temperature, the bubbles will not collapse. As more bubbles accumulate in the channel and combine, the steam space within the channel becomes larger and larger until steam blankets the fuel cell walls. Once the fuel cell walls are blanketed with steam, the rate of heat transfer lowers significantly. Heat is not transferred out of the fuel rods as fast as it is being generated, potentially causing a nuclear meltdown. Because of this potential, all nuclear power plants have reactor protection systems that automatically shut down the reactor if the pressure in the primary circuit falls below a safe level, or if the subcooling margin falls below a safe level. Once the reactor is shut down, the rate at which residual heat is generated in the fuel rods is similar to that of an electric kettle, and the fuel rods can be safely cooled just by being submerged in water at normal atmospheric pressure.
