= Pressurizer (nuclear power) =

Nuclear reactor component

Sectional view of a pressurizer

A pressurizer is a component of a pressurized water reactor. The basic design of the pressurized water reactor includes a requirement that the coolant (water) in the reactor coolant system must not boil. Put another way, the coolant must remain in the liquid state at all times, especially in the reactor vessel. To achieve this, the coolant in the reactor coolant system is maintained at a pressure sufficiently high that boiling does not occur at the coolant temperatures experienced while the plant is operating or in any analyzed possible transient state. To pressurize the coolant system to a higher pressure than the vapor pressure of the coolant at operating temperatures, a separate pressurizing system is required. This is in the form of the pressurizer.

== Design ==
In a pressurized water reactor plant, the pressurizer is a cylindrical pressure vessel with hemispherical ends, mounted with the long axis vertical and directly connected by a single run of piping to the reactor coolant system. It is located inside the reactor containment building. Although the water in the pressurizer is the same reactor coolant as in the rest of the reactor coolant system, and therefore stagnant, i.e. reactor coolant does not flow through the pressurizer continuously as it does in the other parts of the reactor coolant system. Because of its innate incompressibility, water in a connected piping system adjusts equally to pressure changes anywhere in the connected system. The water in the system may not be at the same pressure at all points in the system due to differences in elevation but the pressure responds equally to a change in any one part of the system. From this phenomenon, it was recognized early on that the pressure in the entire reactor coolant system, including the reactor itself, could be controlled by controlling pressure in a small interconnected area of the system and this led to the design of the pressurizer. The pressurizer is a small vessel compared to the other two major vessels of the reactor coolant system, the reactor vessel itself and the steam generator(s).

== Pressure control ==
Pressure in the pressurizer is controlled by varying the temperature of the coolant in the pressurizer. Water pressure in a closed system tracks water temperature directly; as the temperature goes up, pressure goes up and vice versa. To increase the pressure in the reactor coolant system, large electric heaters in the pressurizer are turned on, raising the coolant temperature in the pressurizer and thereby raising the pressure. To decrease pressure in the reactor coolant system, sprays of relatively cool water are turned on inside the pressurizer, lowering the coolant temperature in the pressurizer and thereby lowering the pressure.

== Secondary functions ==
The pressurizer has two secondary functions.

=== Water backup and pressure change moderation ===
One is providing a place to monitor water level in the reactor coolant system. Since the reactor coolant system is completely flooded during normal operations, there is no point in monitoring coolant level in any of the other vessels. But early awareness of a reduction of coolant level (or a loss of coolant) is important to the safety of the reactor core. The pressurizer is deliberately located high in the reactor containment building such that, if the pressurizer has sufficient coolant in it, one can be reasonably certain that all the other vessels of the reactor coolant system (which are below it) are fully flooded with coolant. There is therefore, a coolant level monitoring system on the pressurizer and it is the one reactor coolant system vessel that is normally not full of coolant. The other secondary function is to provide a "cushion" for sudden pressure changes in the reactor coolant system. The upper portion of the pressurizer is specifically designed to NOT contain liquid coolant and a reading of full on the level instrumentation allows for that upper portion to not contain liquid coolant. Because the coolant in the pressurizer is quite hot during normal operations, the space above the liquid coolant is vaporized coolant (steam). This steam bubble provides a cushion for pressure changes in the reactor coolant system and the operators ensure that the pressurizer maintains this steam bubble at all times during operations. Allowing liquid coolant to completely fill the pressurizer eliminates this steam bubble, and is referred to in industry as letting the pressurizer "go hard". This would mean that a sudden pressure change can provide a hammer effect to the entire reactor coolant system. Some facilities also call this letting the pressurizer "go solid," although solid simply refers to being completely full of liquid and without a "steam bubble."

=== Over-pressure relief system ===
Part of the pressurizer system is an over-pressure relief system. In the event that pressurizer pressure exceeds a certain maximum, there is a relief valve called the pilot-operated relief valve (PORV) on top of the pressurizer which opens to allow steam from the steam bubble to leave the pressurizer in order to reduce the pressure in the pressurizer. This steam is routed to a large tank (or tanks) in the reactor containment building where it is cooled back into liquid (condensed) and stored for later disposition. There is a finite volume to these tanks and if events deteriorate to the point where the tanks fill up, a secondary pressure relief device on the tank(s), often a rupture disc, allows the condensed reactor coolant to spill out onto the floor of the reactor containment building where it pools in sumps for later disposition.
