= Nuclear reactor core =

Part of a reactor containing the fuel

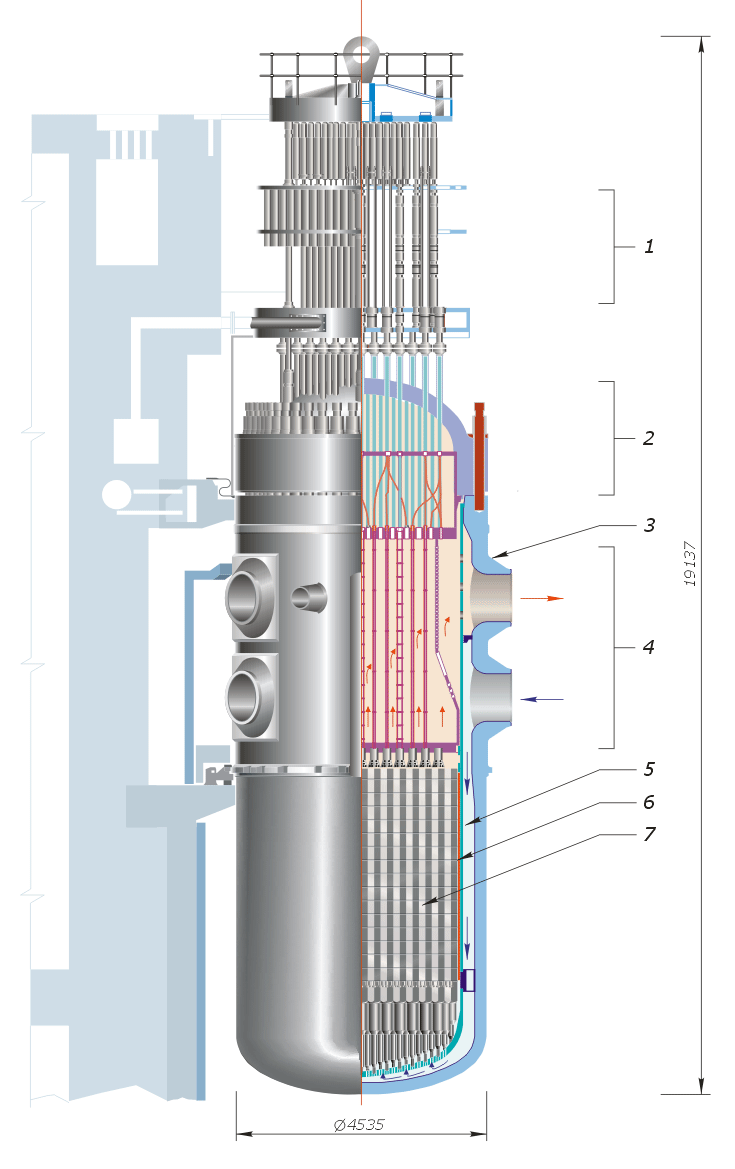
Example of the core of a nuclear power plant, a VVER design.

A nuclear reactor core is the portion of a nuclear reactor containing the nuclear fuel components where the nuclear reactions take place and the heat is generated. Typically, the fuel will be low-enriched uranium contained in thousands of individual fuel pins. The core also contains structural components, the means to both moderate the neutrons and control the reaction, and the means to transfer the heat from the fuel to where it is required, outside the core.

== Water-moderated reactors ==
Inside the core of a typical pressurized water reactor or boiling water reactor are fuel rods with a diameter of a large gel-type ink pen, each about 4 m long, which are grouped by the hundreds or occasionally the thousands in bundles called "fuel assemblies". Inside each fuel rod, pellets of uranium, or more commonly uranium oxide, are stacked end to end. Also inside the core are control rods, filled with pellets of substances like boron or hafnium or cadmium that readily capture neutrons. When the control rods are lowered into the core, they absorb neutrons, which thus cannot take part in the chain reaction. Conversely, when the control rods are lifted out of the way, more neutrons strike the fissile uranium-235 (U-235) or plutonium-239 (Pu-239) nuclei in nearby fuel rods, and the chain reaction intensifies. The core shroud, also located inside of the reactor, directs the water flow to cool the nuclear reactions inside of the core. The heat of the fission reaction is removed by the water, which also acts to moderate the neutron reactions.

== Graphite-moderated reactors ==
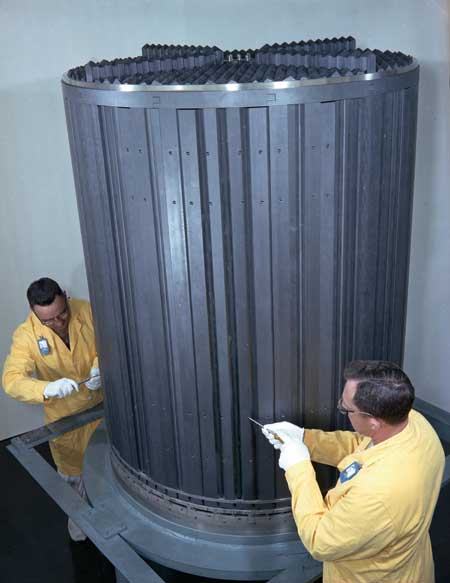
Graphite Molten-Salt Reactor Experiment core

There are also graphite moderated reactors in use.

One type uses solid nuclear graphite for the neutron moderator and ordinary water for the coolant. One such example is the Soviet-made RBMK nuclear-power reactor. This was the type of reactor involved in the Chernobyl disaster.

In the Advanced Gas-cooled Reactor, a British design, the core is made of a graphite neutron moderator where the fuel assemblies are located. Carbon dioxide gas acts as a coolant and it circulates through the core, removing heat.

There have also been several experimental reactors that use graphite for moderation, such as the pebble bed reactor concepts and the molten-salt reactor experiment.

== Experimental and developmental reactors ==
Several merely experimental or hypothetical nuclear reactor cores are mentioned below.

There have been developmental graphite-moderated nuclear power reactors that were cooled by helium gas. These are no longer in service.

The core of a molten salt reactor is a block of graphite through which holes are bored in which molten salt circulates. The graphite serves as a neutron moderator, it is the solid structure of the reactor. The molten salt that circulates in the channels is both the fuel and the coolant, it contains the fissionable material needed to sustain the chain reaction.

A set of compact nuclear reactors were developed by the United States under the Systems Nuclear Auxiliary Power Program (SNAP). One SNAP reactor, the SNAP-10A was launched into space and was successfully operated for 43 days in 1965.

Aqueous homogeneous reactors cores employ water in which soluble nuclear salts (usually uranyl sulfate or uranyl nitrate) have been dissolved. As the water serves as the solvent for the uranium salts, it serves as the fuel. As it is water, it serves to cool the reactor as well- hence the name 'homogeneous' (as coolant and fuel are one homogeneous substance). The water can be either heavy water or ordinary light water.

In a gaseous fission reactor the reaction takes place in a core which is bounded and created by magnetic field. The fuel is supplied and fission occurs in the gas phase.

== Thermal limits ==
Thermal limits are among the most important constraints in nuclear reactor core operations. They are derived within the calculations of fuel reload cycles to define the maximum power output a reactor core can sustain while maintaining the integrity of its fuel and ensuring stable operation. These limits are calculated from the interactions between heat, neutron flux, and component material properties within the core. If exceeded, they can lead to overheating, fuel damage, and operational disruptions that compromise the plant’s license to operate.

== See also ==
- Nuclear meltdown
- Lists of nuclear disasters and radioactive incidents
- Nuclear power
- Nuclear reactor technology
