= Nuclear licensing =

Legal process used to permit nuclear facilities

Nuclear licensing is the legal process used to permit nuclear power plants and other nuclear facilities. Each country has its own regulatory system that often has significant variations from other countries.

The World Nuclear Association classifies countries nuclear regulations in several major categories:

- Countries with large mature nuclear programs and privately funded nuclear projects, including the United States and United Kingdom. Such countries often have unpredictable regulatory systems that can completely cancel a project after large investments
- Countries with large nuclear programs that are state-funded, including China and India. These countries have more predictable approval processes, but often have weak international collaboration.
- Countries with small mature nuclear programs, including the Czech Republic and Bulgaria. These countries heavily rely on foreign expertise in their regulatory processes.
- Countries with emerging nuclear programs, including Turkey and the United Arab Emirates. These countries often have weak regulatory systems and drastic differences in regulatory approach from other countries.

One major factor in the complexity of the licensing process is whether a proposed nuclear facility is the first of its kind or a well established design. New designs have a longer and more detailed review process, while facilities that use an established design have a simpler process that often focuses on the site-specific issues for that project.

Nuclear materials and use of those materials (see also Radioactive Materials) typically requires a license of some sort from the government(s) in which the activities will be conducted. In the United States, licenses are issued either by the U.S. Nuclear Regulatory Commission, or in some cases by the individual states who have been delegated authority for some licensing activities, e.g. Arizona (Arizona Radiation Regulatory Agency).

In Great Britain, the Health and Safety Executive oversees licenses and nuclear safety.

== See also ==
- Combined Construction and Operating License
