= Nuclear reactor =

Device for controlled nuclear reactions

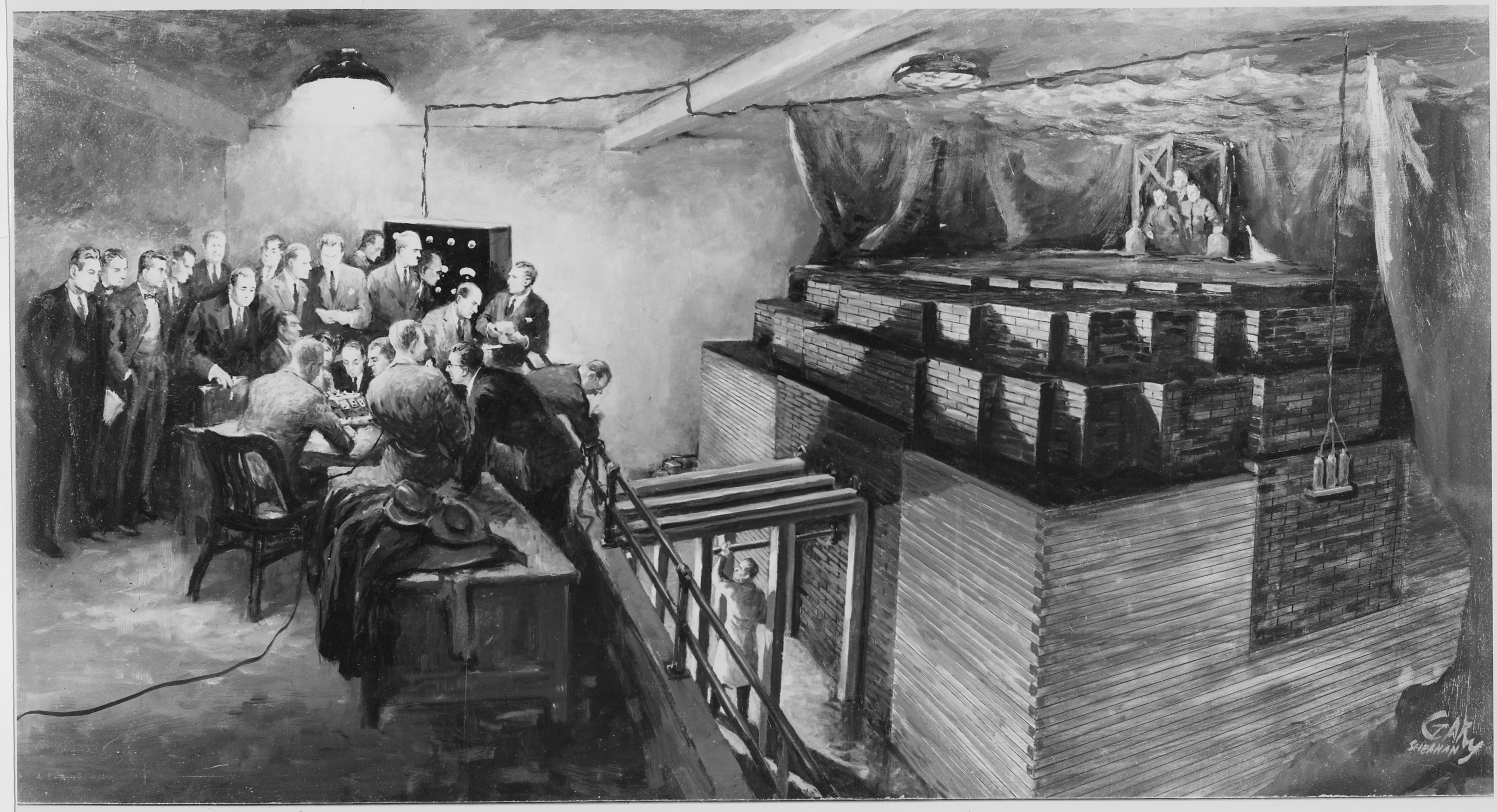
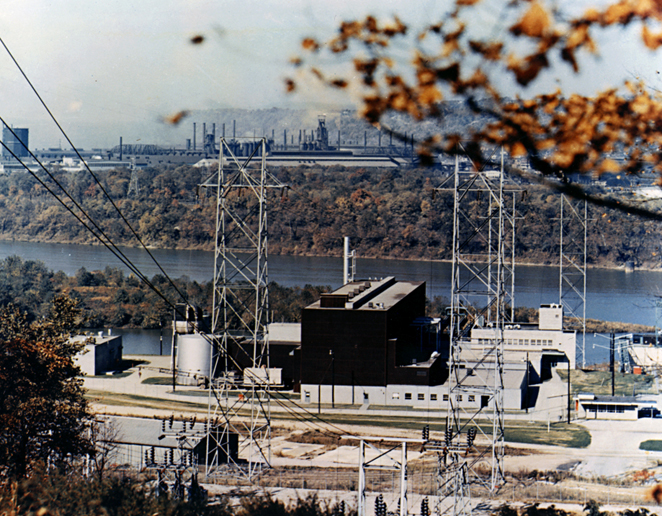
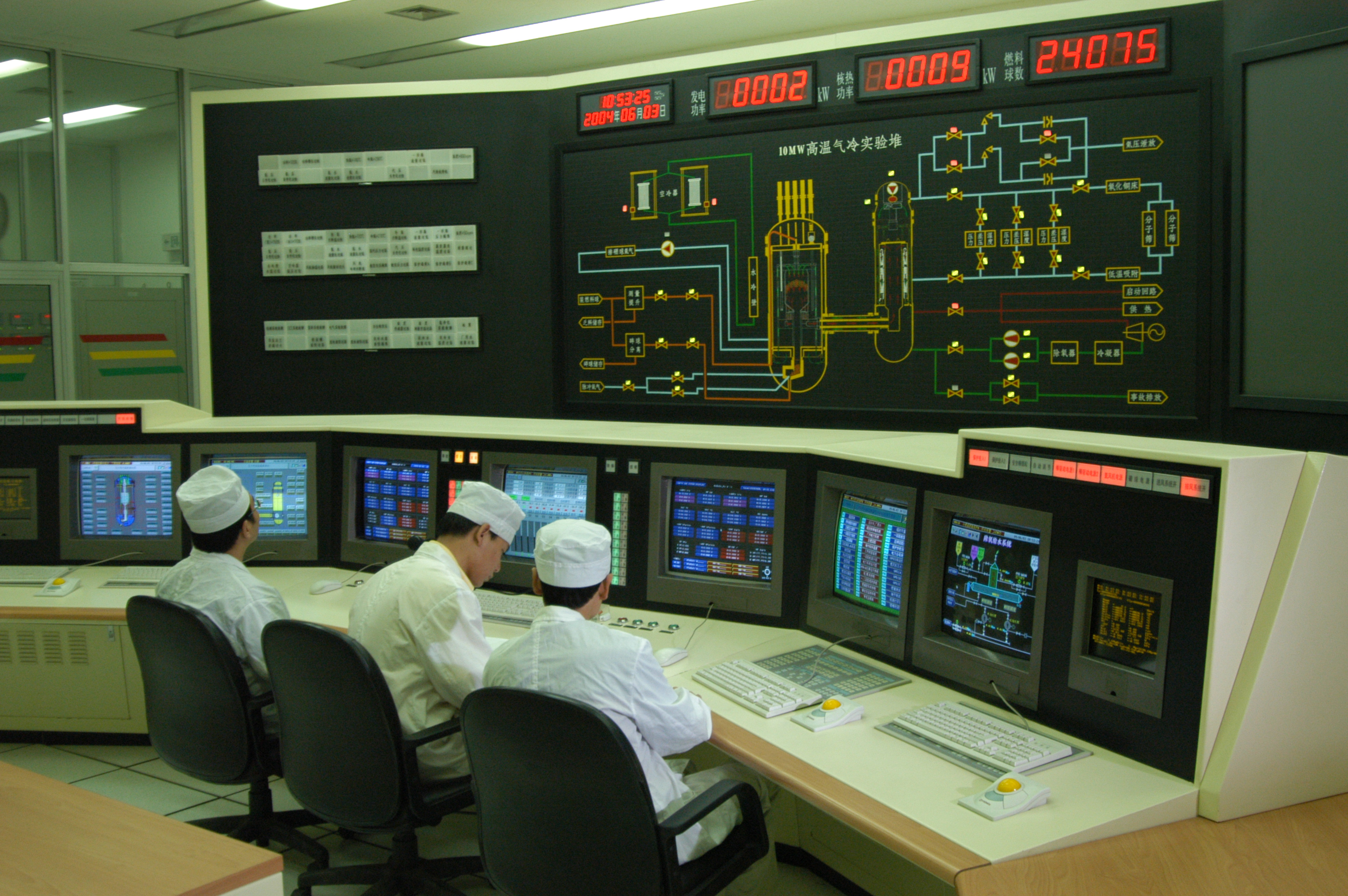
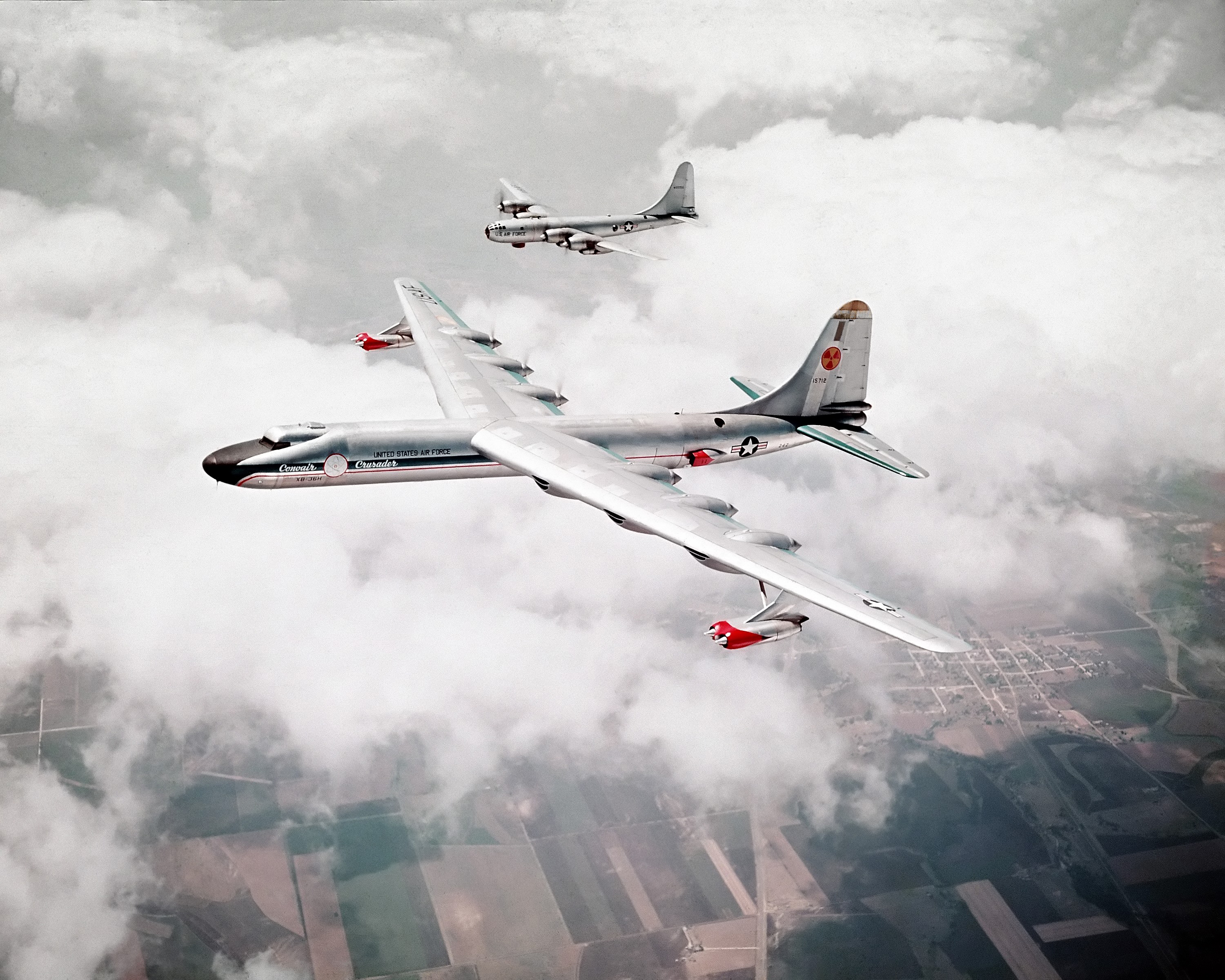
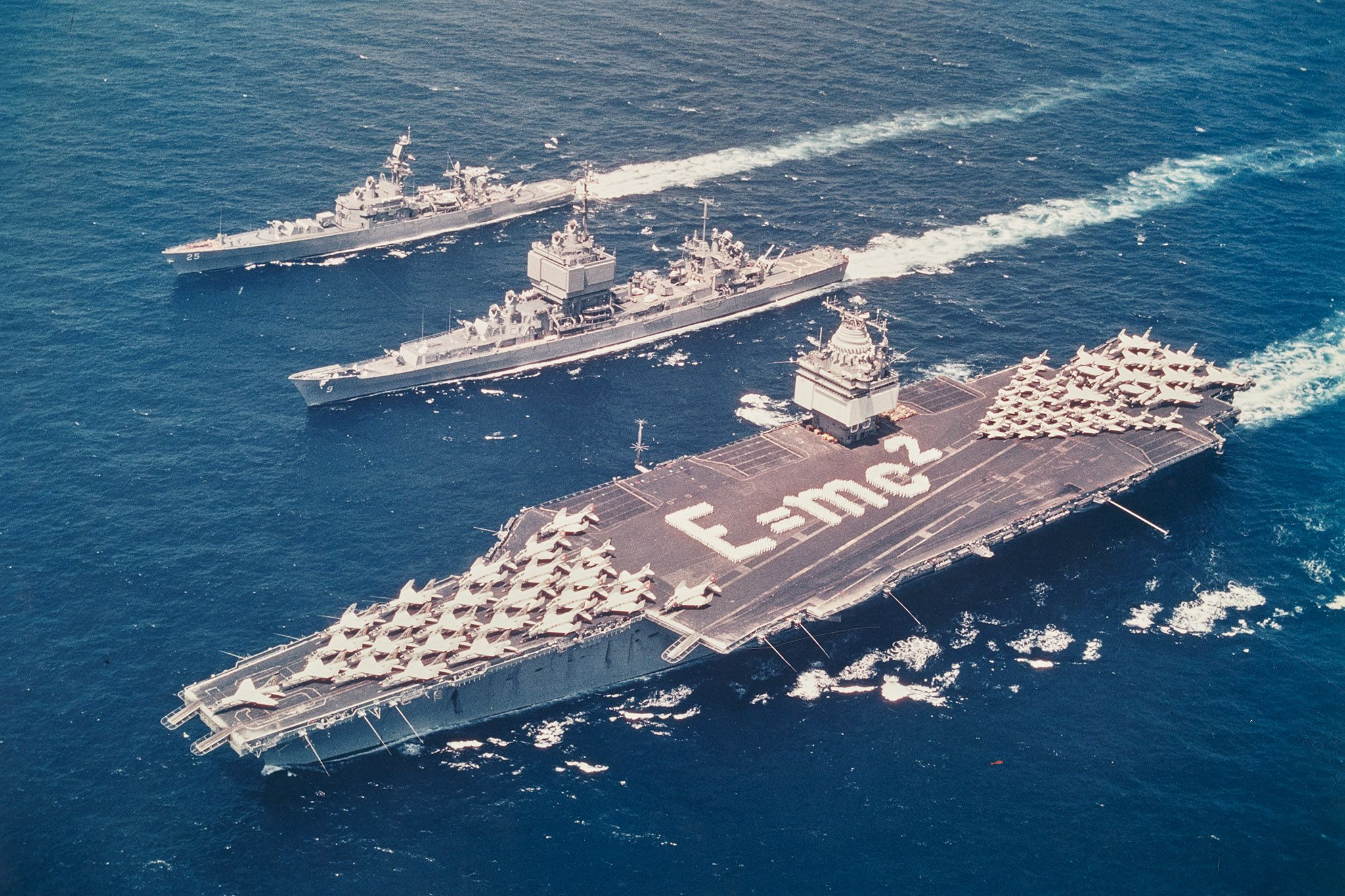
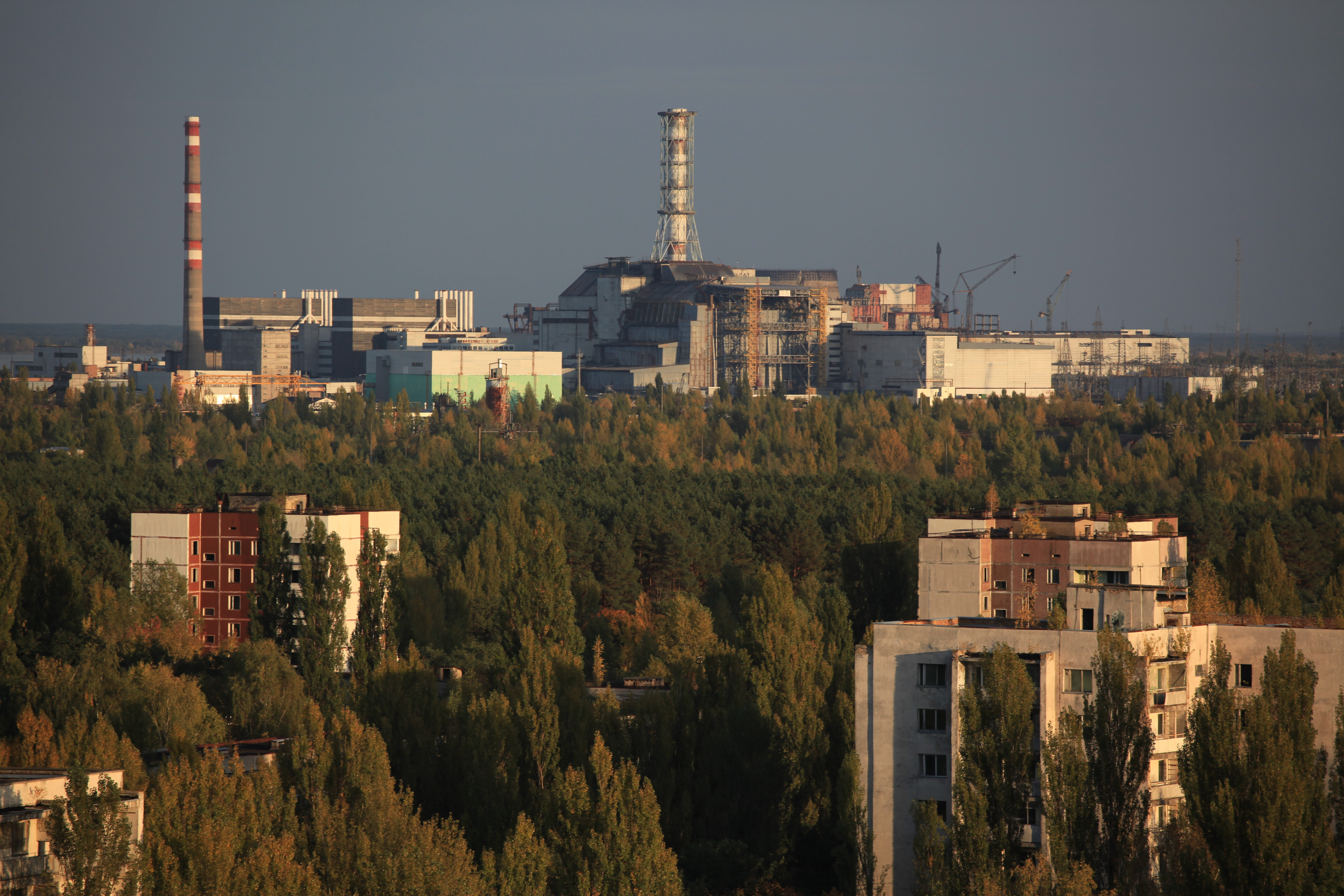
From top, left to right
1. Chicago Pile-1, the first artificial nuclear reactor
2. Shippingport Atomic Power Station, the first peacetime reactor
3. HTR-10, a prototype to the first Generation IV reactor, HTR-PM
4. The Convair NB-36H, the first aircraft to test an onboard reactor
5. Operation Sea Orbit, the first nuclear-powered surface vessel circumnavigation
6. The Chernobyl sarcophagus, built to contain the effects of the 1986 disaster

A nuclear reactor is a device used to sustain a controlled fission nuclear chain reaction. They are used for commercial electricity, marine propulsion, weapons production, and research. Fissile nuclei (primarily uranium-235 or plutonium-239) absorb single neutrons and split, releasing energy and multiple neutrons, which can induce further fission. Reactors stabilize this, regulating neutron absorbers and moderators in the core. Fuel efficiency is exceptionally high; low-enriched uranium is 120,000 times more energy-dense than coal.

When the fissile nuclei splits, it generates heat; which is then passed to a coolant, usually water. In commercial reactors, this drives turbines and electrical generator shafts. Some reactors are used for district heating, and isotope production for medical and industrial use.

After the discovery of fission in 1938, many countries launched military nuclear research programs. Early subcritical experiments probed neutronics. In 1942, the first artificial (Note: An extinct natural nuclear fission reactor was discovered in 1972 in Oklo, Gabon.) critical nuclear reactor, Chicago Pile-1, was built by the Metallurgical Laboratory. From 1944, for weapons production, the first large-scale reactors were operated at the Hanford Site. The pressurized water reactor design, used in about 70% of commercial reactors, was developed for US Navy submarine propulsion, beginning with S1W in 1953. In 1954, small-scale nuclear electricity production began with the Soviet Obninsk plant. The first commercial nuclear power station was Calder Hall at Sellafield, England, which started operation in 1956.

Spent fuel can be reprocessed, potentially reducing nuclear waste and recovering reactor-usable fuel. This also poses a nuclear proliferation risk via production of plutonium for nuclear weapons.

Reactor accidents have been caused by combinations of design and operator failure. The 1979 Three Mile Island accident, at INES Level 5, and the 1986 Chernobyl and 2011 Fukushima disasters, both at Level 7, had major effects on the nuclear industry and anti-nuclear movement.

As of 2026, there are 441 commercial reactors, 228 research reactors, and over 200 marine propulsion reactors in operation globally. Commercial reactors provide 9% of the global electricity supply, compared to 30% from renewables, together comprising low-carbon electricity. Almost 90% of this comes from pressurized and boiling water reactors. Other designs include gas-cooled, fast-spectrum, breeder, heavy-water, molten-salt, and small modular, each of which improves safety, efficiency, cost, fuel type, enrichment, or burnup, and the now-obsolete Light water graphite reactor.

== Terminology ==
During early 1940s nuclear research, the phrase "atomic pile" was used to refer to any assembly involving uranium and attempts at neutron multiplication, most of which were subcritical. After Chicago Pile-1 demonstrated a self-sustaining chain reaction, the "reactor" terminology became more common. The phrases "nuclear pile" and "atomic reactor" were also common.

Critical mass experiments, while being far simpler, are sometimes referred to as research reactors, such as the Godiva device.

The term "nuclear reactor" is predominantly used to refer to nuclear fission reactors. It can also refer to a nuclear fusion reactor, of which only net negative power systems have been constructed. Radioisotope thermoelectric generators and radioisotope heater units, while deriving power from nuclear decay reactions, are not referred to as nuclear reactors as they do not induce reactions.

== Operation ==
An example of an induced nuclear fission event. A neutron is absorbed by the nucleus of a uranium-235 atom, which in turn splits into fast-moving lighter elements (fission products) and free neutrons. Though both reactors and nuclear weapons rely on nuclear chain reactions, the rate of reactions in a reactor is much slower than in a bomb.

Just as conventional thermal power stations generate electricity by harnessing the thermal energy released from burning fossil fuels, nuclear reactors convert the energy released by controlled nuclear fission into thermal energy for further conversion to mechanical or electrical forms.

=== Fission ===
When a large fissile atomic nucleus such as uranium-235, uranium-233, or plutonium-239 absorbs a neutron, it may undergo nuclear fission. The heavy nucleus splits into two or more lighter nuclei (the fission products), releasing kinetic energy, gamma radiation, and free neutrons. A portion of these neutrons may be absorbed by other fissile atoms and trigger further fission events, which release more neutrons, and so on. This is known as a nuclear chain reaction.

To control such a nuclear chain reaction, control rods containing neutron poisons and neutron moderators are able to change the portion of neutrons that will go on to cause more fission. Nuclear reactors generally have automatic and manual systems to shut the fission reaction down if monitoring or instrumentation detects unsafe conditions.

=== Heat generation ===
The reactor core generates heat in several ways:

- The kinetic energy of fission products is converted to thermal energy when these nuclei collide with nearby atoms.
- The reactor absorbs some of the gamma rays produced during fission and converts their energy into heat.
- Heat is produced by the radioactive decay of fission products and materials that have been activated by neutron absorption. This decay heat source will remain for some time even after the reactor is shut down.

A kilogram of uranium-235 (U-235) converted via nuclear processes releases approximately three million times more energy than a kilogram of coal burned conventionally (7.2 × 10^{13} joules per kilogram of uranium-235 versus 2.4 × 10^{7} joules per kilogram of coal).

The fission of one kilogram of uranium-235 releases about 19 billion kilocalories, so the energy released by 1 kg of uranium-235 corresponds to that released by burning 2.7 million kg of coal.

=== Cooling ===
A nuclear reactor coolant – usually water but sometimes a gas or a liquid metal (like liquid sodium or lead) or molten salt – is circulated past the reactor core to absorb the heat that it generates. The heat is carried away from the reactor and is then used to generate steam. Most reactor systems employ a cooling system that is physically separated from the water that will be boiled to produce pressurized steam for the turbines, like the pressurized water reactor. However, in some reactors the water for the steam turbines is boiled directly by the reactor core – for example, the boiling water reactor.

=== Reactivity control ===
The rate of fission reactions within a reactor core can be adjusted by controlling the quantity of neutrons that are able to induce further fission events. Nuclear reactors typically employ several methods of neutron control to adjust the reactor's power output. Some of these methods arise naturally from the physics of radioactive decay and are simply accounted for during the reactor's operation, while others are mechanisms engineered into the reactor design for a distinct purpose.

The fastest method for adjusting the levels of fission-inducing neutrons in a reactor is by movement of the control rods. Control rods are made of so-called neutron poisons, (usually boron) and therefore absorb neutrons. When a control rod is inserted deeper into the reactor, it absorbs more neutrons than the material it displaces – often the moderator. This action results in fewer neutrons available to cause fission, which can reduce the reactor's power output. Conversely, extracting the control rod will result in an increased rate of fission events, which can increase power.

The physics of radioactive decay also affects neutron populations in a reactor. One such process is delayed neutron emission by a number of neutron-rich fission isotopes. These delayed neutrons account for about 0.65% of the total neutrons produced in fission, with the remainder (termed "prompt neutrons") released immediately upon fission. The fission products that produce delayed neutrons have half-lives for their decay by neutron emission that range from milliseconds to as long as several minutes; considerable time is required to determine exactly when a reactor reaches the critical point. Keeping the reactor in the zone of chain reactivity where delayed neutrons are necessary to achieve a critical mass state allows mechanical devices or human operators to control a chain reaction in "real time"; otherwise, the time between achievement of criticality and nuclear meltdown as a result of an exponential power surge from the normal nuclear chain reaction would be too short to allow for intervention. This last stage, where delayed neutrons are no longer required to maintain criticality, is known as the prompt critical point. There is a scale for describing criticality in numerical form in which bare criticality is known as zero dollars, the prompt critical point is one dollar, and other points in the process are interpolated in cents.

In some reactors, the coolant also acts as a neutron moderator. A moderator increases the power of the reactor by causing the fast neutrons that are released from fission to lose energy and become thermal neutrons. Thermal neutrons are more likely than fast neutrons to cause fission. If the coolant is a moderator, then temperature changes can affect the density of the coolant/moderator and therefore change power output. A higher-temperature coolant would be less dense and therefore a less effective moderator.

In other reactors, the coolant acts as a poison by absorbing neutrons in the same way that the control rods do. In these reactors, power output can be increased by heating the coolant, which makes it a less dense poison. Nuclear reactors generally have automatic and manual systems to scram the reactor in an emergency shutdown. These systems insert large amounts of poison (often boron in the form of boric acid) into the reactor to shut the fission reaction down if unsafe conditions are detected or anticipated.

Most types of reactors are sensitive to a process variously known as xenon poisoning, or the iodine pit. The common fission product Xenon-135 produced in the fission process acts as a neutron poison that absorbs neutrons and therefore tends to shut the reactor down. Xenon-135 accumulation can be controlled by keeping power levels high enough to destroy it by neutron absorption as fast as it is produced. Fission also produces iodine-135, which in turn decays (with a half-life of 6.57 hours) to new xenon-135. When the reactor is shut down, iodine-135 continues to decay to xenon-135, making restarting the reactor more difficult for a day or two, as the xenon-135 decays into cesium-135, which is not nearly as poisonous as xenon-135, with a half-life of 9.2 hours. This temporary state is the "iodine pit." If the reactor has sufficient excess reactivity, it can be restarted. As the extra xenon-135 is transmuted to xenon-136, which is much less of a neutron poison, within a few hours the reactor experiences a "xenon burnoff (power) transient". Control rods must be further inserted to replace the neutron absorption of the lost xenon-135. Failure to properly follow such a procedure was a key step in the Chernobyl disaster.

Reactors used in nuclear marine propulsion (especially nuclear submarines) often cannot be operated at continuous power around the clock as land-based power reactors are normally run, and they also often need to have a very long core life without refueling. For this reason, many designs use highly enriched uranium but incorporate burnable neutron poison in the fuel rods. This allows the reactor to be constructed with an excess of fissionable material. Early in the fuel burn cycle, safety is maintained by the presence of the neutron-absorbing material. Over the operating life of the fuel load, this initial absorber is gradually replaced by naturally produced neutron poisons that persist and accumulate far longer than xenon-135.

=== Electrical power generation ===
The energy released in the fission process generates heat, some of which can be converted into usable energy. A common method of harnessing this thermal energy is to use it to boil water to produce pressurized steam, which will then drive a steam turbine that turns an alternator and generates electricity.

=== Lifetimes ===
Modern nuclear power plants are typically designed for a lifetime of 60 years, while older reactors were built with a planned typical lifetime of 30–40 years, though many of those have received renovations and life extensions of 15–20 years. Some believe nuclear power plants can operate for 80 years or longer with proper maintenance and management. While most components of a nuclear power plant, such as steam generators, are replaced when they reach the end of their useful lifetime, the overall lifetime of the power plant is limited by the life of components that cannot be replaced when aged by wear and neutron embrittlement, such as the reactor pressure vessel. At the end of their planned life span, plants may receive an extension of the operating license for some 20 years, and in the US even a "subsequent license renewal" (SLR) for an additional 20 years.

Even when a license is extended, it does not guarantee the reactor will continue to operate, particularly in the face of safety concerns or incidents. Many reactors are closed long before their license or design life expires and are decommissioned. The costs of replacements or improvements required for continued safe operation may be so high that they are not cost-effective, or reactors may be shut down due to technical failure. Others have been shut down because the area was contaminated, like Fukushima, Three Mile Island, Sellafield, and Chernobyl. The British branch of the French concern EDF Energy, for example, extended the operating lives of its Advanced Gas-cooled Reactors (AGR) by between only 3 and 10 years. All seven AGR plants were expected to be shut down in 2022 and in decommissioning by 2028. Hinkley Point B was extended from 40 to 46 years and closed. The same happened with Hunterston B, also after 46 years.

An increasing number of reactors are reaching or crossing their design lifetimes of 30 or 40 years. In 2014, Greenpeace warned that the lifetime extension of ageing nuclear power plants amounts to entering a new era of risk. It estimated the current European nuclear liability coverage on average as too low by a factor of between 100 and 1,000 to cover the likely costs, and at the same time, the likelihood of a serious accident happening in Europe continues to increase as the reactor fleet grows older.

== History ==
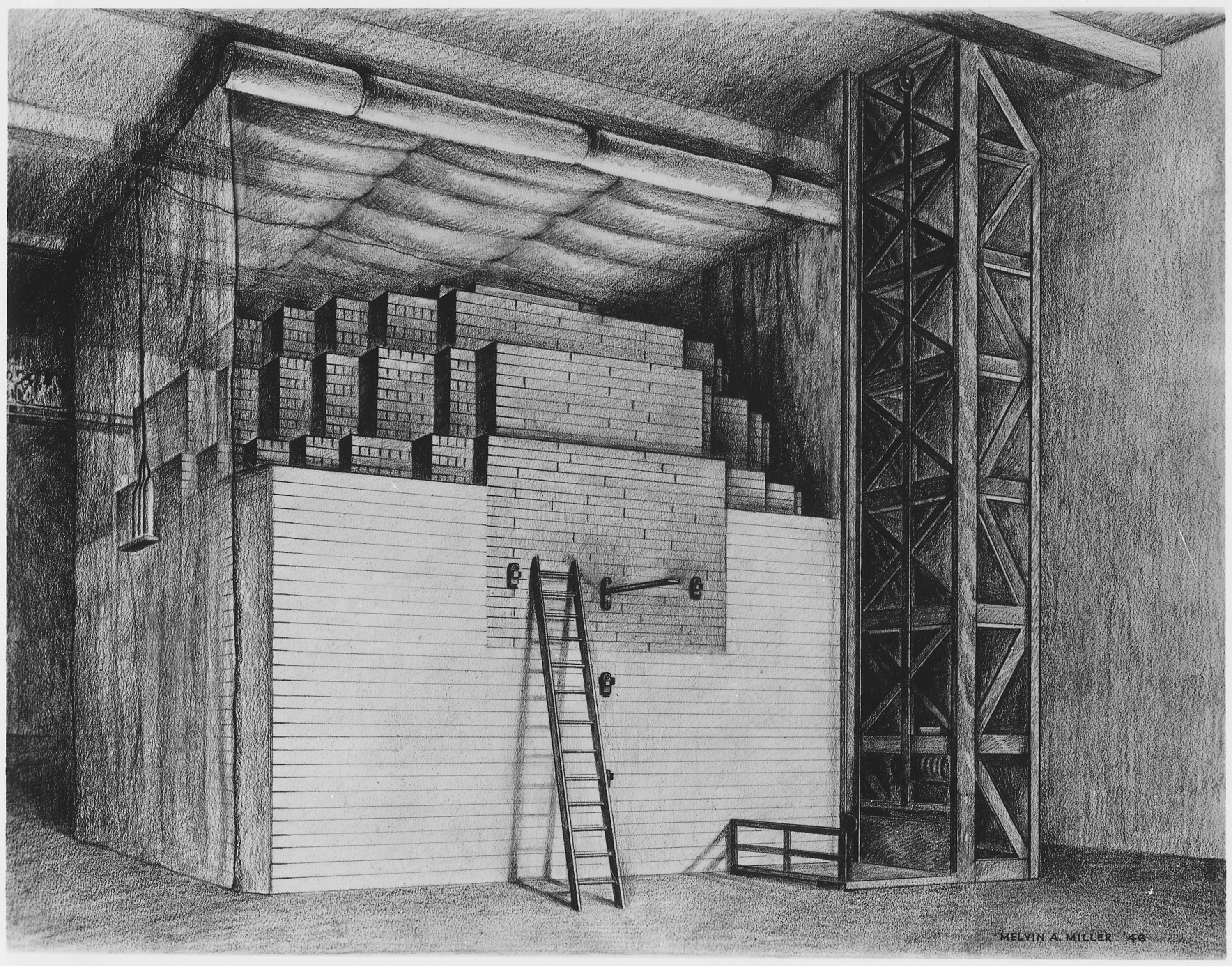
The Chicago Pile, the first artificial nuclear reactor, built in secrecy at the University of Chicago in 1942 during World War II as part of the US's Manhattan Project

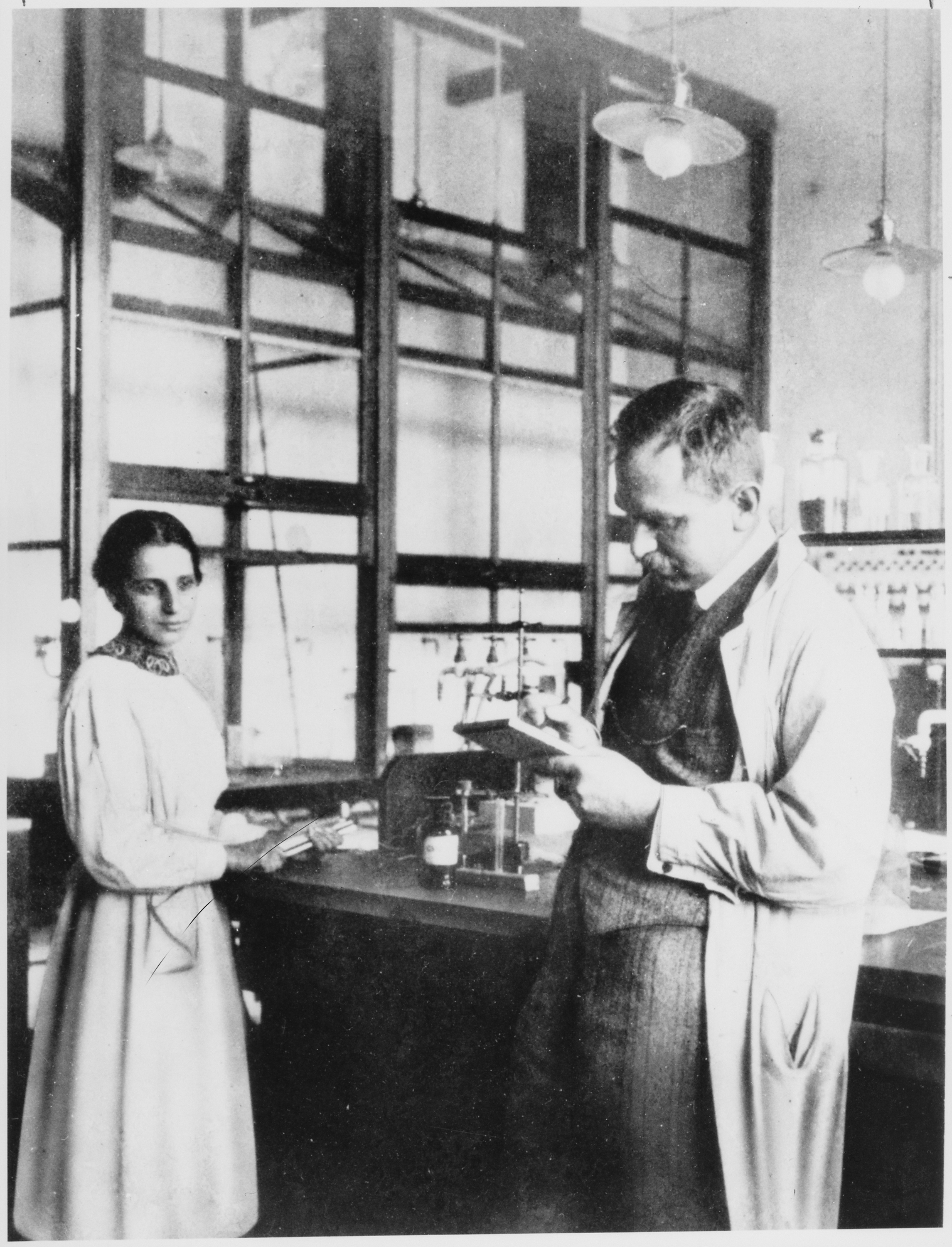
Lise Meitner and Otto Hahn in their laboratory

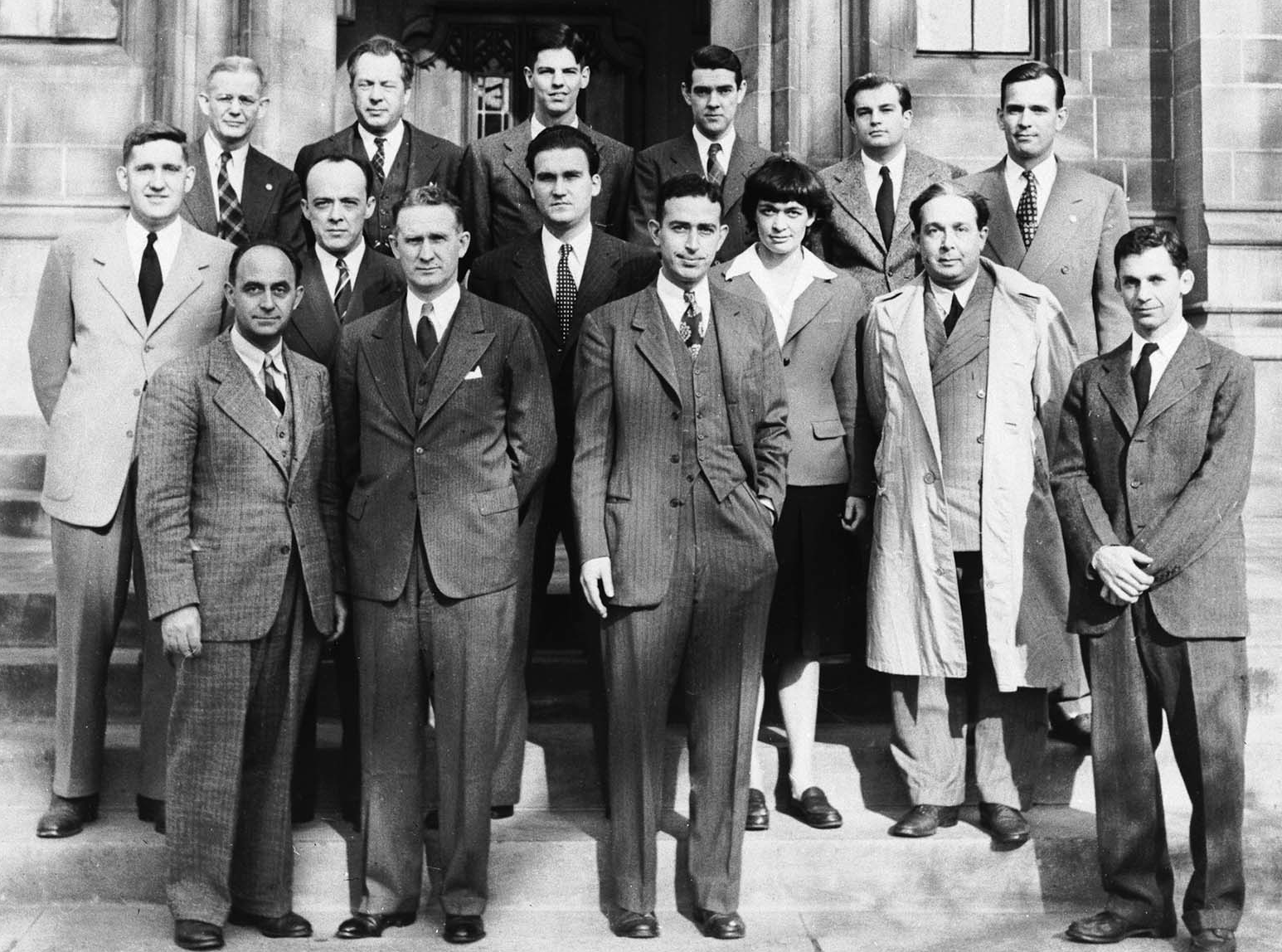
Some of the Chicago Pile Team, including Enrico Fermi (leftmost man, front row) and Leó Szilárd (rightmost man, middle row)

The neutron was discovered in 1932 by British physicist James Chadwick. In 1933, Hungarian scientist Leó Szilárd conceptualized the neutron-mediated nuclear chain reaction. He filed a patent for his idea of a simple reactor the following year while working at the Admiralty in London, England. However, Szilárd's idea did not incorporate nuclear fission as a neutron source since that process had not yet been discovered. Szilárd's ideas for nuclear reactors that used neutron-mediated nuclear chain reactions in light elements proved unworkable.

Inspiration for a new type of reactor using uranium came from the discovery by Otto Hahn, Lise Meitner, and Fritz Strassmann in 1938 that bombardment of uranium with neutrons (provided by an alpha-on-beryllium fusion reaction, a "neutron howitzer") produced a barium residue, which they reasoned was created by fission of the uranium nuclei. In their second publication on nuclear fission in February 1939, Hahn and Strassmann predicted the existence and liberation of additional neutrons during the fission process, opening the possibility of a nuclear chain reaction. Subsequent studies in early 1939 (one of them by Szilárd and Fermi) revealed that several neutrons were indeed released during fission, making possible the nuclear chain reaction that Szilárd had envisioned six years earlier.

On 2 August 1939, Albert Einstein signed a letter to President Franklin D. Roosevelt (written by Szilárd) suggesting that the discovery of uranium's fission could lead to the development of "extremely powerful bombs of a new type", giving impetus to the study of reactors and fission. Szilárd and Einstein knew each other well and had worked together years earlier. However, Einstein had never considered this possibility for nuclear energy until Szilárd reported it to him at the beginning of his quest to produce the Einstein-Szilárd letter to alert the US government.

Shortly after, Nazi Germany invaded Poland in 1939, starting World War II in Europe. The US was not yet officially at war, but in October, when the Einstein-Szilárd letter was delivered to him, Roosevelt commented that the purpose of doing the research was to make sure "the Nazis don't blow us up." The US nuclear project followed, although with some delay, as skepticism persisted (some of it from Enrico Fermi) and there was little action from the small number of government officials initially charged with moving the project forward.

The following year, the US Government received the Frisch–Peierls memorandum from the UK, which stated that the amount of uranium needed for a chain reaction was far lower than had previously been thought. The memorandum was a product of the MAUD Committee, which was working on the UK atomic bomb project, known as Tube Alloys, later subsumed into the Manhattan Project.

Eventually, the first artificial nuclear reactor, Chicago Pile-1, was constructed at the University of Chicago by a team led by Italian physicist Enrico Fermi in late 1942. By this time, the program had been under pressure for a year due to US entry into the war. The Chicago Pile achieved criticality on 2 December 1942 at 3:25 pm. The reactor support structure was made of wood. It supported a pile (hence the name) of graphite blocks, embedded in which were natural uranium oxide 'pseudospheres' or 'briquettes'.

Soon after the Chicago Pile, in 1943, the Metallurgical Laboratory began developing a number of nuclear reactors for the Manhattan Project. The primary purpose for the largest reactors (located at the Hanford Site in Washington) was the mass production of plutonium for nuclear weapons. Fermi and Szilard applied for a patent on reactors on 19 December 1944. Its issuance was delayed by 10 years due to wartime secrecy.

"World's first nuclear power plant" is the claim made by signs at the site of the EBR-I, which is now a museum near Arco, Idaho. Originally called "Chicago Pile-4", it was carried out under the direction of Walter Zinn for Argonne National Laboratory. This experimental LMFBR operated by the US Atomic Energy Commission produced 0.8 kW in a test on 20 December 1951 and 100 kW (electrical) the following day, having a design output of 200 kW (electrical).

Besides the military uses of nuclear reactors, there were political reasons to pursue civilian use of atomic energy. US President Dwight Eisenhower made his famous Atoms for Peace speech to the UN General Assembly on 8 December 1953. This diplomacy led to the dissemination of reactor technology to US institutions and worldwide.

The first nuclear power plant built for civil purposes was the AM-1 Obninsk Nuclear Power Plant, launched on 27 June 1954 in the Soviet Union. It produced around 5 MW (electrical). It was built after the F-1 (nuclear reactor), which was the first reactor to go critical in Europe, and was also built by the Soviet Union.

After World War II, the US military sought other uses for nuclear reactor technology. Research by the Army led to the power stations for Camp Century, Greenland, and McMurdo Station, Antarctica, under the Army Nuclear Power Program. The Air Force Nuclear Bomber project resulted in the Molten-Salt Reactor Experiment. The US Navy succeeded when it steamed the USS Nautilus (SSN-571) on nuclear power on 17 January 1955.

The first commercial nuclear power station, Calder Hall in Sellafield, England, was opened in 1956 with an initial capacity of 50 MW (later 200 MW).

The first portable nuclear reactor, "Alco PM-2A", was used to generate electrical power (2 MW) for Camp Century from 1960 to 1963.

=== Table by date ===
Reactors constructed before 1950
Name	Alternate names	Country	Location	Moderator	Criticality date
Chicago Pile-1	CP-1	United States	University of Chicago, Illinois	Graphite	2 December 1942
Chicago Pile-2	CP-2	United States	Site A, Illinois	Graphite	20 March 1943
Oak Ridge Graphite Reactor	X-10, Clinton Pile	United States	Clinton Laboratories, Tennessee	Graphite	4 November 1943
305 Test Pile		United States	Hanford Site, Washington	Graphite	March 1944
Chicago Pile-3	CP-3	United States	Site A, Illinois	Heavy water	15 May 1944
Los Alamos LOPO Reactor	LOPO	United States	Los Alamos Laboratory, New Mexico	Light water	9 May 1944
B Reactor		United States	Hanford Site, Washington	Graphite	26 September 1944
Los Alamos Water Boiler	HYPO	United States	Los Alamos Laboratory, New Mexico	Light water	December 1944
D Reactor		United States	Hanford Site, Washington	Graphite	December 1944
Dragon		United States	Los Alamos Laboratory, New Mexico	None (fast)	20 January 1945
F Reactor		United States	Hanford Site, Washington	Graphite	February 1945
Trinity, first US nuclear test					16 July 1945
Zero Energy Experimental Pile	ZEEP	Canada	Chalk River Laboratories, Ontario	Heavy water	5 September 1945
Los Alamos Fast Reactor	Clementine	United States	Los Alamos Laboratory, New Mexico	None (fast)	19 November 1946
F-1		Soviet Union	Laboratory No. 2, Moscow	Graphite	25 December 1946
National Research Experimental	NRX	Canada	Chalk River Laboratories, Ontario	Heavy water	22 July 1947
Graphite Low Energy Experimental Pile	GLEEP	United Kingdom	Atomic Energy Research Establishment, Oxfordshire	Graphite	15 August 1947
Reactor A		Soviet Union	Mayak Production Association, Chelyabinsk Oblast	Graphite	10 June 1948
British Experimental Pile Operation	BEPO	United Kingdom	Atomic Energy Research Establishment, Oxfordshire	Graphite	3 July 1948
Eau Lourde-1 (Heavy Water-1)	EL-1, Zoé	France	Fort de Châtillon, Paris	Heavy water	15 December 1948
Physical Boiler on Fast Neutrons	FKBN	Soviet Union	Design Bureau No. 11, Sarov	None (fast)	1 February 1949
TVR	TVR	Soviet Union	Laboratory No. 3, Moscow	Heavy water	April 1949
RDS-1, first Soviet nuclear test					29 August 1949
H Reactor		United States	Hanford Site, Washington	Graphite	October 1949

=== Table by country ===
First nations to operate a nuclear reactor
Country	First reactor	Criticality date	First grid-connected reactor	Connection date
United States	CP-1	2 December 1942	Shippingport Atomic Power Station	18 December 1957
Canada	ZEEP	5 September 1945	Nuclear Power Demonstration	4 June 1962
Soviet Union	F-1	25 December 1946	Obninsk Nuclear Power Plant	27 June 1954
United Kingdom	GLEEP	15 August 1947	Calder Hall nuclear power station	27 August 1956
France	EL-1 (Zoé)	15 December 1948	Marcoule Nuclear Site	22 April 1959
Norway (Note: JEEP was constructed jointly by the Norwegian NTNF and the Dutch FOM)	JEEP	30 July 1951	None constructed	n/a
Sweden	R1	13 July 1954	Ågesta Nuclear Plant	1 May 1964
Belgium	BR1	11 May 1956	BR3	10 October 1962
India	Apsara	4 August 1956	Tarapur Atomic Power Station	1 April 1969
Japan	JRR-1	27 August 1957	Tōkai Nuclear Power Plant	25 July 1966
West Germany	FRM-I	31 October 1957	Kahl Nuclear Power Plant	17 June 1961
East Germany	RFR	16 December 1957	Rheinsberg Nuclear Power Plant	6 May 1966
China	HWRR	27 September 1958	Qinshan Nuclear Power Plant	15 December 1991
Italy	ISPRA-1	20 November 1959	Latina Nuclear Power Plant	May 1963

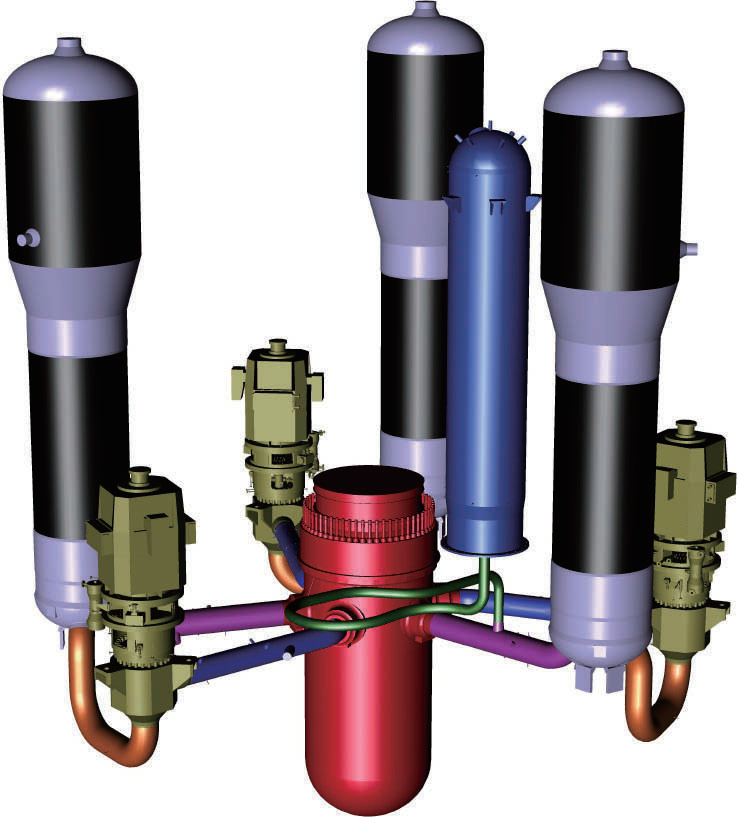
Primary coolant system showing reactor pressure vessel (red), steam generators (purple), pressurizer (blue), and pumps (green) in the three coolant loop Hualong One pressurized water reactor design

== Reactor types ==

- PWR: 277 (63.2%)
- BWR: 80 (18.3%)
- GCR: 15 (3.4%)
- PHWR: 49 (11.2%)
- LWGR: 15 (3.4%)
- FBR: 2 (0.5%)
Number of reactors by type (end 2014)

- PWR: 257.2 (68.3%)
- BWR: 75.5 (20.1%)
- GCR: 8.2 (2.2%)
- PHWR: 24.6 (6.5%)
- LWGR: 10.2 (2.7%)
- FBR: 0.6 (0.2%)
Net power capacity (GWe) by type (end 2014)

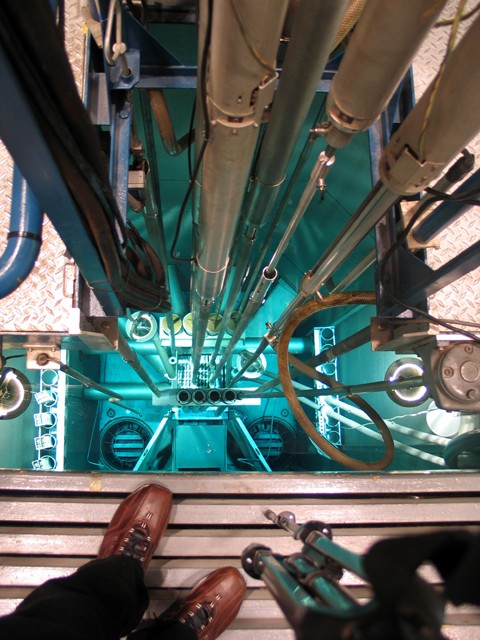
NC State's PULSTAR Reactor is a 1 MW pool-type research reactor with 4% enriched, pin-type fuel consisting of UO_{2} pellets in zircaloy cladding.

=== Classifications ===
==== By type of nuclear reaction ====
All commercial power reactors are based on nuclear fission. They generally use uranium and its product plutonium as nuclear fuel, though a thorium fuel cycle is also possible. Fission reactors can be divided roughly into two classes, depending on the energy of the neutrons that sustain the fission chain reaction:

- Thermal-neutron reactors use slowed or thermal neutrons to keep up the fission of their fuel. Almost all current reactors are of this type. These contain neutron moderator materials that slow neutrons until their neutron temperature is thermalized, that is, until their kinetic energy approaches the average kinetic energy of the surrounding particles. Thermal neutrons have a far higher cross section (probability) of fissioning the fissile nuclei uranium-235, plutonium-239, and plutonium-241, and a relatively lower probability of neutron capture by uranium-238 (U-238) compared to the faster neutrons that originally result from fission, allowing use of low-enriched uranium or even natural uranium fuel. The moderator is often also the coolant, usually water under high pressure to increase the boiling point. These are surrounded by a reactor vessel, instrumentation to monitor and control the reactor, radiation shielding, and a containment building.
- Fast-neutron reactors use fast neutrons to cause fission in their fuel. They do not have a neutron moderator, and they use less-moderating coolants. Maintaining a chain reaction requires the fuel to be more highly enriched in fissile material (about 20% or more) due to the relatively lower probability of fission versus capture by U-238. Fast reactors have the potential to produce less transuranic waste because all actinides are fissionable with fast neutrons, but they are more difficult to build and more expensive to operate. Overall, fast reactors are less common than thermal reactors in most applications. Some early power stations were fast reactors, as are some Russian naval propulsion units. Construction of prototypes is continuing (see fast-breeder reactors or Generation IV reactors).

In principle, fusion power could be produced by nuclear fusion of elements such as the deuterium isotope of hydrogen. While fusion power has been an ongoing research topic since at least the 1940s, no self-sustaining fusion reactor for any purpose has ever been built.

==== By moderator material ====
Used by thermal reactors:

- Graphite-moderated reactors
  - Mostly early reactors – such as the Chicago Pile, Obninsk AM-1, Windscale Piles, RBMK, Magnox, and others such as AGR – use graphite as a moderator.
- Water-moderated reactors
  - Heavy-water reactors (Used in Canada, India, Argentina, China, Pakistan, Romania, and South Korea).
  - Light-water-moderated reactors (LWRs). Light-water reactors (the most common type of thermal reactor) use ordinary water to moderate and cool the reactors. Because the light hydrogen isotope is a slight neutron poison, these reactors need artificially enriched fuels. When at operating temperature, if the water temperature increases, its density drops, and fewer neutrons passing through it are slowed enough to trigger further reactions. That negative feedback stabilizes the reaction rate. Graphite and heavy-water reactors tend to be more thoroughly thermalized than light water reactors. Due to the extra thermalization and the absence of the light hydrogen poisoning effects, these types can use natural uranium/unenriched fuel.
- Light-element-moderated reactors
  - Molten-salt reactors (MSRs) are moderated by light elements such as lithium or beryllium. These elements are parts of the reactor's coolant/fuel matrix salts, such as LiF and BeF_{2}, as well as LiCl and BeCl_{2}.
  - Liquid-metal-cooled reactors, such as those using a lead-bismuth coolant, may use BeO as a moderator.
- Organically moderated reactors (OMR) use biphenyl and terphenyl as moderator and coolant.

==== By coolant ====
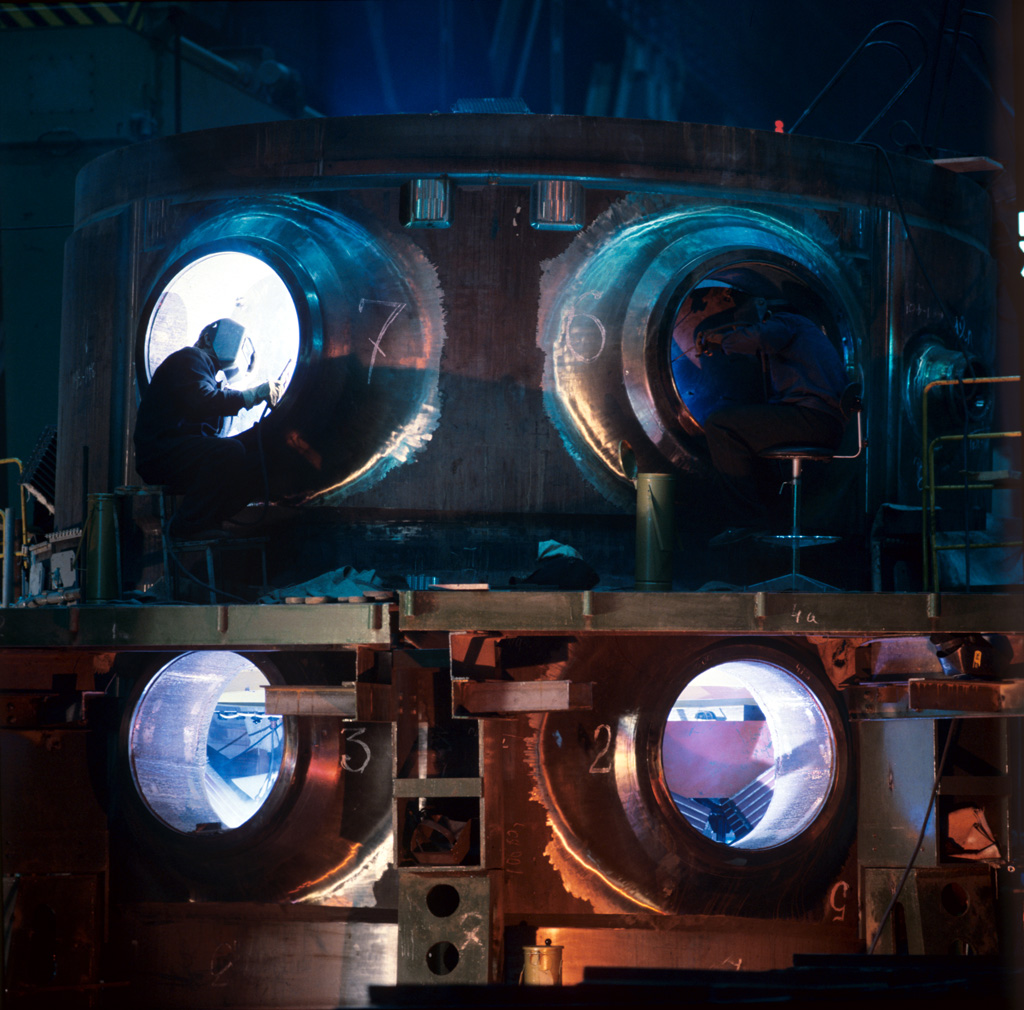
Treatment of the interior part of a VVER-1000 reactor frame at Atommash

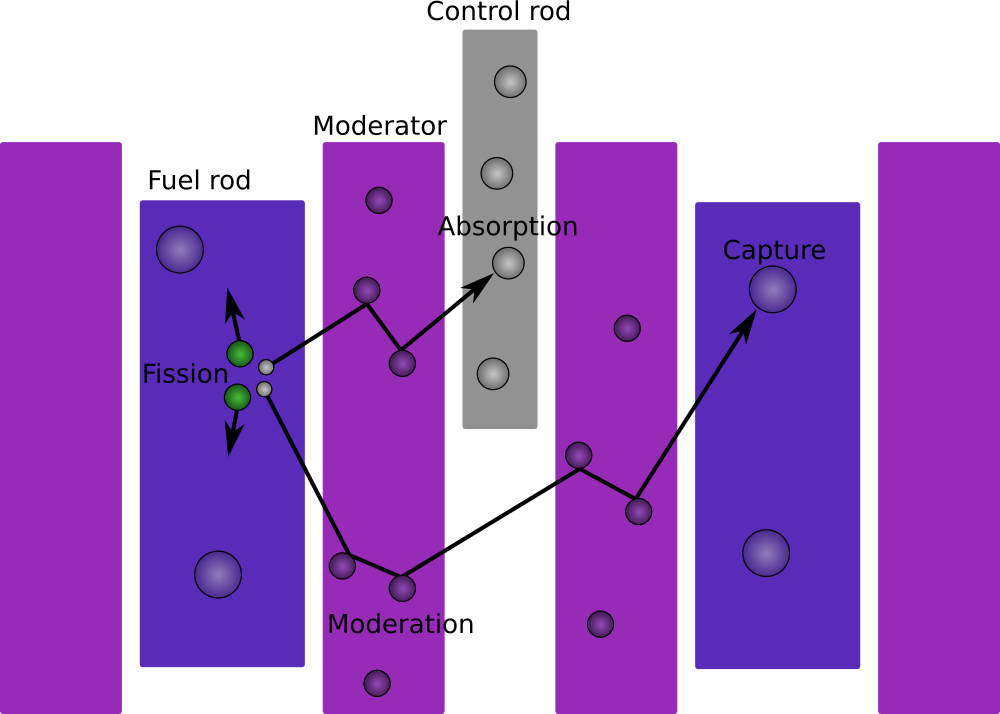
In thermal nuclear reactors, specifically LWRs, the coolant acts as a moderator that slows neutrons before the fuel can efficiently absorb them.

- Water-cooled reactor. These constitute the great majority of operational nuclear reactors: as of 2014, 93% of the world's nuclear reactors are water-cooled, providing about 95% of the world's total nuclear generation capacity.
  - Pressurized-water reactor (PWR). Pressurized-water reactors constitute the large majority of all Western nuclear power plants.
    - A primary characteristic of PWRs is a pressurizer, a specialized pressure vessel. Most commercial PWRs and naval reactors use pressurizers. During normal operation, a pressurizer is partially filled with water, and a steam bubble is maintained above it by heating the water with submerged heaters. During normal operation, the pressurizer is connected to the primary reactor pressure vessel (RPV), and the pressurizer "bubble" provides an expansion space for changes in the reactor's water volume. This arrangement also provides a means of pressure control for the reactor by increasing or decreasing the steam pressure in the pressurizer using the pressurizer heaters.
    - Pressurized heavy-water reactors are a subset of pressurized water reactors, sharing the use of a pressurized, isolated heat transport loop, but using heavy water as coolant and moderator for the greater neutron economies it offers.
  - Boiling-water reactor (BWR)
    - BWRs are characterized by boiling water around the fuel rods in the lower portion of a primary reactor pressure vessel. A boiling water reactor uses ^{235}U, enriched as uranium dioxide, as its fuel. The fuel is assembled into rods housed in a steel vessel that is submerged in water. The nuclear fission causes the water to boil, generating steam. This steam flows through pipes into turbines, driving them and thereby generating electricity. During normal operation, pressure is controlled by the amount of steam flowing from the reactor pressure vessel to the turbine.
  - Supercritical water reactor (SCWR)
    - SCWRs are a Generation IV reactor concept where the reactor is operated at supercritical pressures and water is heated to a supercritical fluid, which never undergoes a transition to steam yet behaves like saturated steam, to power a steam generator.
  - Reduced moderation water reactor (RMWR) uses more highly enriched fuel with the fuel elements set closer together to allow a faster neutron spectrum, sometimes called an Epithermal neutron Spectrum.
  - Pool-type reactor can refer to unpressurized water-cooled open pool reactors, but not to be confused with pool-type LMFBRs, which are sodium-cooled.
  - Some reactors have been cooled by heavy water that also served as a moderator. Examples include:
    - Early CANDU reactors (later ones use heavy-water moderator but light-water coolant)
    - DIDO-class research reactors
- Liquid-metal-cooled reactor. Since water is a moderator, it cannot be used as a coolant in a fast reactor. Liquid-metal coolants have included sodium, sodium–potassium alloy (NaK), lead, lead-bismuth eutectic, and in early reactors, mercury.
  - Sodium-cooled fast reactor
  - Lead-cooled fast reactor
- Gas-cooled reactors are cooled by a circulating gas. In commercial nuclear power plants, carbon dioxide has usually been used – for example, in current British AGR nuclear power plants and formerly in several first-generation British, French, Italian, and Japanese plants. Nitrogen and helium have also been used, helium being considered particularly suitable for high-temperature designs. Use of the heat varies depending on the reactor. Commercial nuclear power plants run the gas through a heat exchanger to make steam for a steam turbine. Some experimental designs run hot enough that the gas can directly power a gas turbine.
- Molten-salt reactors (MSRs) are cooled by circulating a molten salt, typically a eutectic mixture of fluoride salts, such as FLiBe. In a typical MSR, the coolant is also used as a matrix in which the fissile material is dissolved. Other eutectic salt combinations used include ZrF_{4} with NaF and LiCl with BeCl_{2}.
- Organic nuclear reactors use organic fluids such as biphenyl and terphenyl as coolant rather than water.
- Heat pipe-cooled reactors use heat pipes to transfer heat away from the core instead of using a circulating coolant.

==== By generation ====
- Generation I reactor (early prototypes such as Shippingport Atomic Power Station, research reactors, non-commercial power-producing reactors)
- Generation II reactor (most current nuclear power plants, 1965–1996)
- Generation III reactor (evolutionary improvements of existing designs, 1996–2016)
- Generation III+ reactor (evolutionary development of Gen III reactors, offering improvements in safety over Gen III reactor designs, 2017–2021)
- Generation IV reactor (technologies still under development; unknown start date, see below)
- Generation V reactor (designs that are theoretically possible but not being actively considered or researched at present).

In 2003, the French Commissariat à l'Énergie Atomique (CEA) was the first to refer to "Gen II" types in Nucleonics Week.

The first mention of "Gen III" was in 2000, in conjunction with the launch of the Generation IV International Forum (GIF) plans.

"Gen IV" was named in 2000 by the United States Department of Energy (DOE) for developing new plant types.

==== By type of fuel ====
- Uranium
- Plutonium
- Mixed oxide (MOX) fuel
- Uranium-plutonium alloy
- Transuranium element mix (neptunium, plutonium, americium, curium)
- Thorium

==== By phase of fuel ====
- Solid fueled
  - Ceramic
    - Oxide
    - Carbide
    - Nitride
  - Metal
- Fluid fueled
  - Aqueous homogeneous reactor
  - Molten-salt reactor
  - Molten metal reactor (e.g. LAMPRE)
- Gas fueled (theoretical)

==== By shape of the core ====
- Cubical
- Cylindrical
- Octagonal
- Spherical
- Slab
- Annulus

==== By use ====
- Electricity
  - Nuclear power plants including small modular reactors
- Propulsion, see nuclear propulsion
  - Nuclear marine propulsion
  - Various proposed forms of rocket propulsion
- Other uses of heat
  - Desalination
  - Heat for domestic and industrial heating
  - Hydrogen production for use in a hydrogen economy
- Production reactors for transmutation of elements
  - Breeder reactors are capable of producing more fissile material than they consume during the fission chain reaction (by converting fertile U-238 to Pu-239, or Th-232 to U-233). Thus, a uranium breeder reactor, once running, can be refueled with natural or even depleted uranium, and a thorium breeder reactor can be refueled with thorium; however, an initial stock of fissile material is required.
  - Creating various radioactive isotopes, such as americium for use in smoke detectors, and cobalt-60, molybdenum-99, and others, used for imaging and medical treatment.
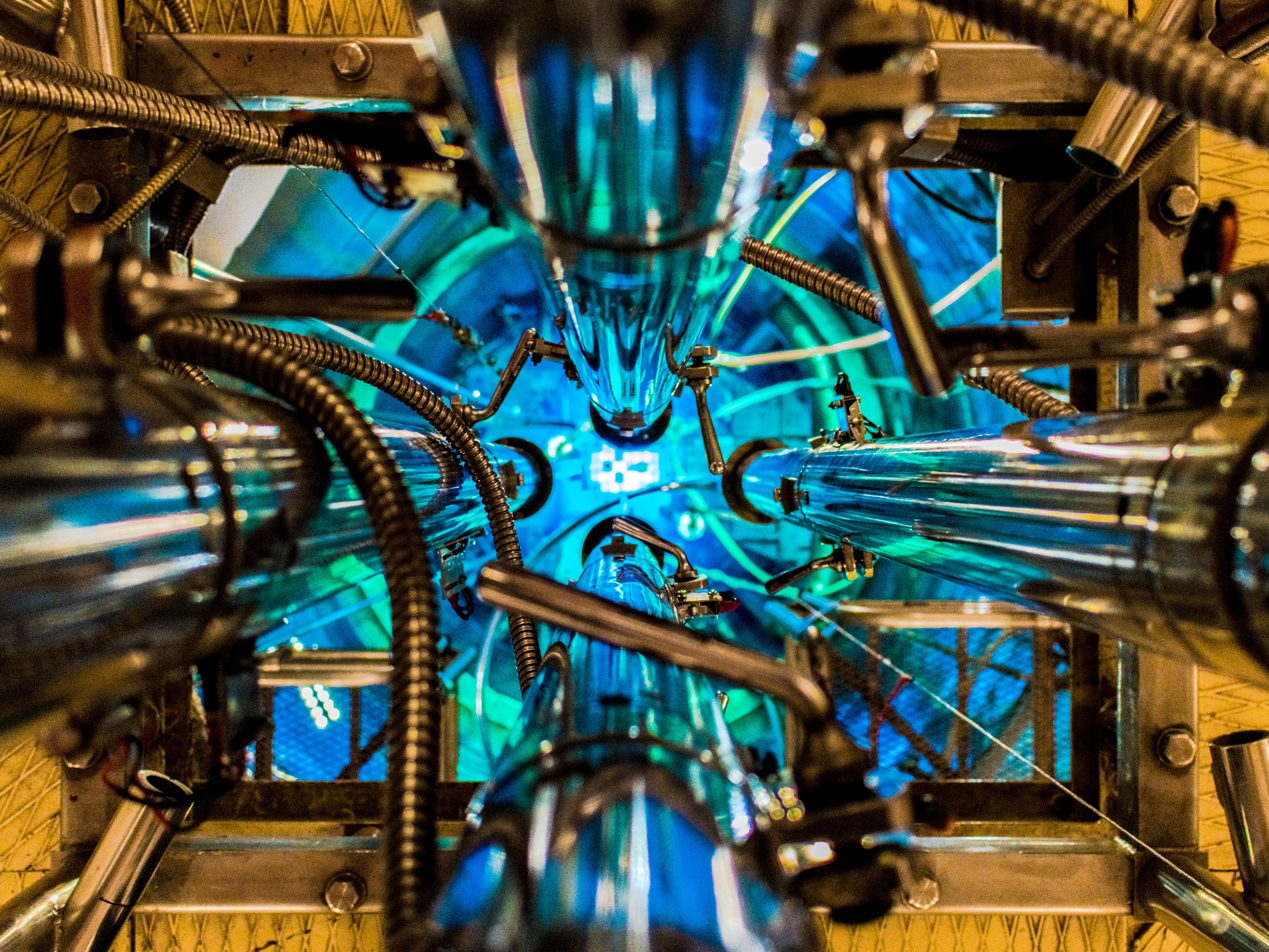
    Overhead view of the core of the RA-3 Research and Production Reactor (CNEA, Argentina)
  - Production of materials for nuclear weapons such as weapons-grade plutonium
- Providing a source of neutron radiation (for example with the pulsed Godiva device) and positron radiation (e.g. neutron activation analysis and potassium–argon dating)
- Research reactor: Typically reactors used for research and training, materials testing, or the production of radioisotopes for medicine and industry. These are much smaller than power reactors or those propelling ships, and many are on university campuses. About 280 such reactors are operating across 56 countries. Some operate with high-enriched uranium fuel, and international efforts are underway to substitute low-enriched fuel.

=== Current technologies ===
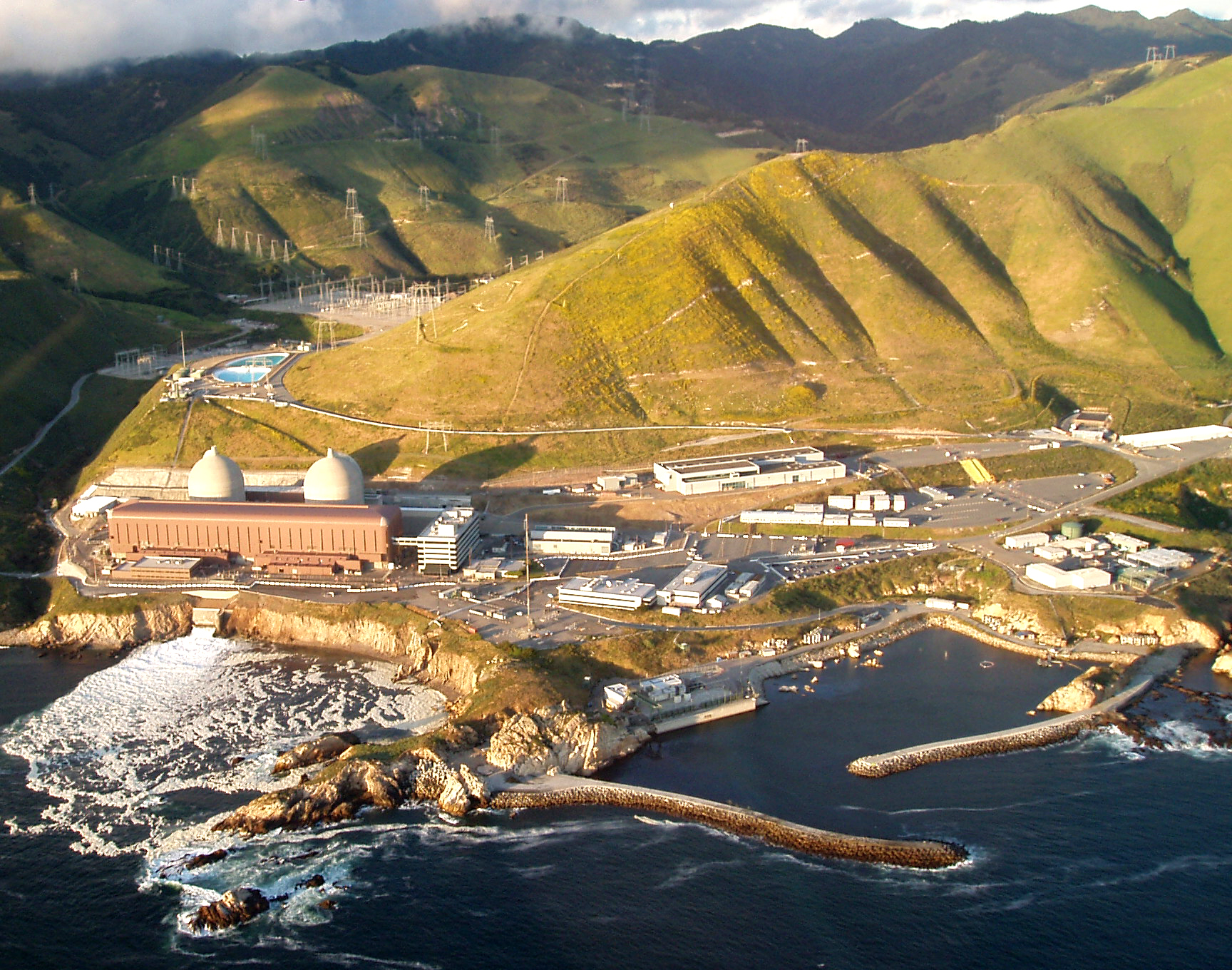
Diablo Canyon – a PWR

- Pressurized water reactors (PWR) [moderator: high-pressure water; coolant: high-pressure water]

These reactors use a pressure vessel to contain the nuclear fuel, control rods, moderator, and coolant. The hot radioactive water that leaves the pressure vessel is looped through a steam generator, which in turn heats a secondary (nonradioactive) loop of water to steam that can run turbines. As of 2024, 308 PWRs comprise 74% of operating power reactors. This is a thermal neutron reactor design, the newest of which are the Russian VVER-1200, Japanese Advanced Pressurized Water Reactor, American AP1000, Chinese Hualong Pressurized Reactor and the Franco-German European Pressurized Reactor. All the United States Naval reactors are of this type.

- Boiling water reactors (BWR) [moderator: low-pressure water; coolant: low-pressure water]

A BWR is like a PWR without the steam generator. The lower pressure of its cooling water allows it to boil inside the pressure vessel, producing the steam that runs the turbines. Unlike a PWR, there is no primary and secondary loop. The thermal efficiency of these reactors can be higher, and they can be simpler, and even potentially more stable and safe. This is a thermal-neutron reactor design, the newest of which are the Advanced Boiling Water Reactor and the Economic Simplified Boiling Water Reactor.

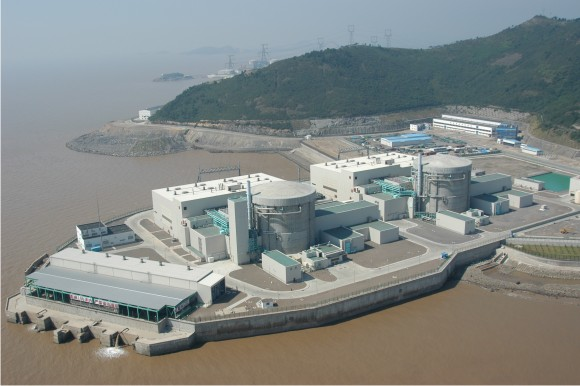
The CANDU Qinshan Nuclear Power Plant

- Pressurized Heavy-Water Reactor (PHWR) [moderator: high-pressure heavy water; coolant: high-pressure heavy water]

A Canadian design (known as CANDU), very similar to PWRs but using heavy water. While heavy water is significantly more expensive than ordinary water, it has greater neutron economy (creates a higher number of thermal neutrons), allowing the reactor to operate without fuel enrichment facilities. Instead of using a single large pressure vessel as in a PWR, the fuel is contained in hundreds of pressure tubes. These reactors are fueled with natural uranium and are thermal-neutron reactor designs. PHWRs can be refueled while at full power (online refueling), which makes them very efficient in their use of uranium (it allows for precise flux control in the core). CANDU PHWRs have been built in Canada, Argentina, China, India, Pakistan, Romania, and South Korea. India also operates several PHWRs, often termed 'CANDU derivatives', built after the Government of Canada halted nuclear dealings with India following the 1974 Smiling Buddha nuclear weapon test.

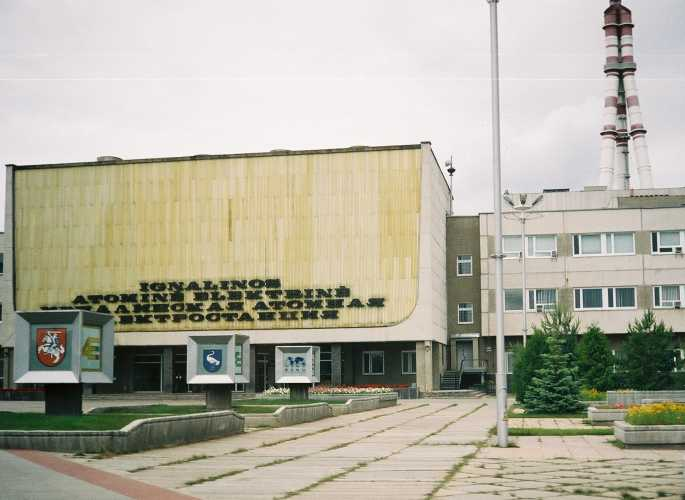
The Ignalina Nuclear Power Plant – an RBMK type (closed 2009)

- Reaktor Bolshoy Moschnosti Kanalniy (High Power Channel Reactor) (RBMK) (also known as a Light-Water Graphite-moderated Reactor – LWGR) [moderator: graphite; coolant: high-pressure water]

A Soviet design, RBMKs are in some respects similar to CANDU in that they can be refueled during power operation and employ a pressure tube design instead of a PWR-style pressure vessel. However, unlike CANDU, they are unstable and large, making containment buildings for them expensive. A series of critical safety flaws have also been identified with the RBMK design, though some of these were corrected following the Chernobyl disaster. Their main attraction is their use of light water and unenriched uranium. As of 2024, 7 remain open, mostly due to safety improvements and help from international safety agencies such as the US Department of Energy. Despite these safety improvements, RBMK reactors are still considered one of the most dangerous reactor designs in use. RBMK reactors were deployed only in the former Soviet Union.

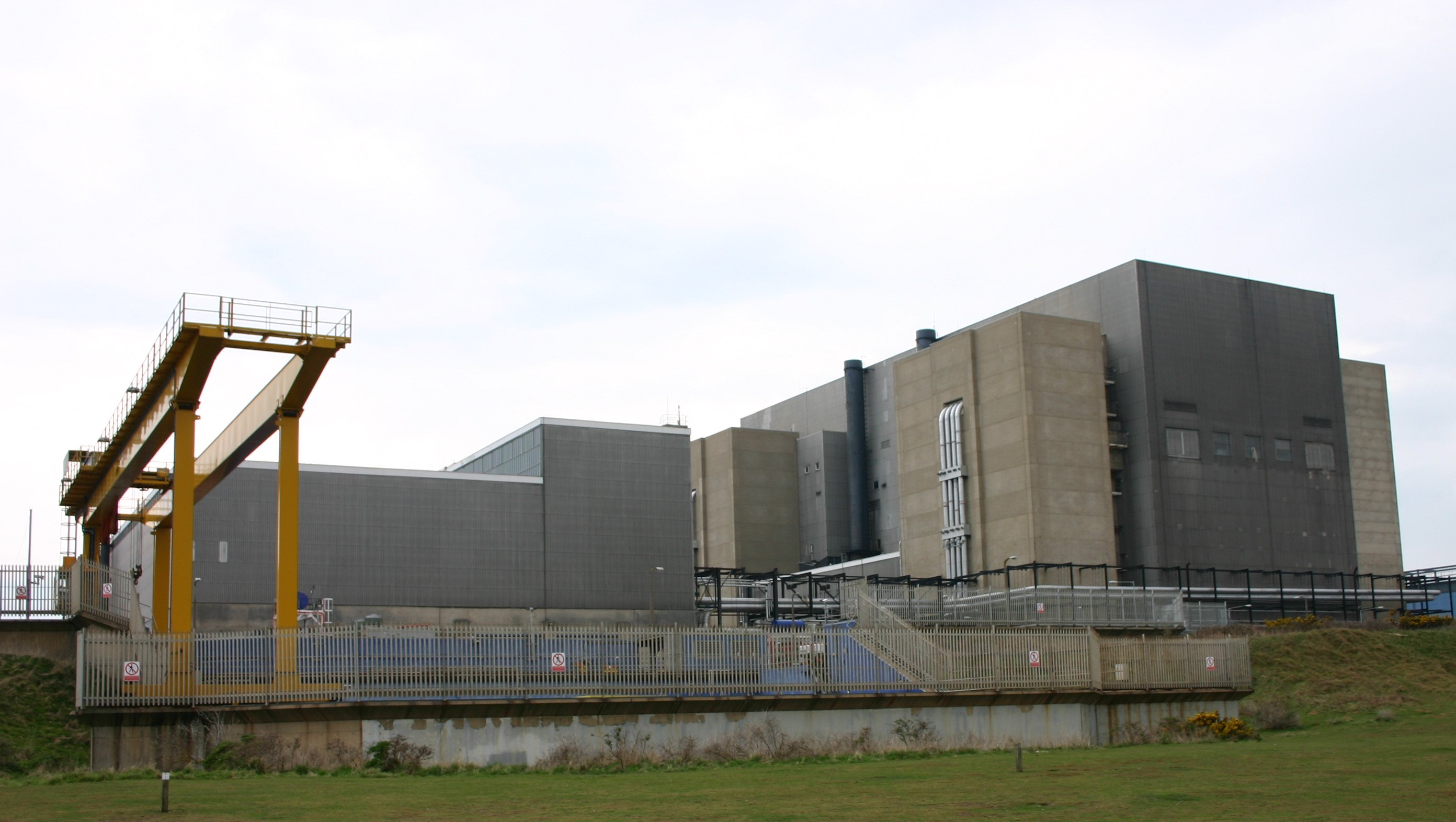
The Magnox Sizewell A nuclear power station

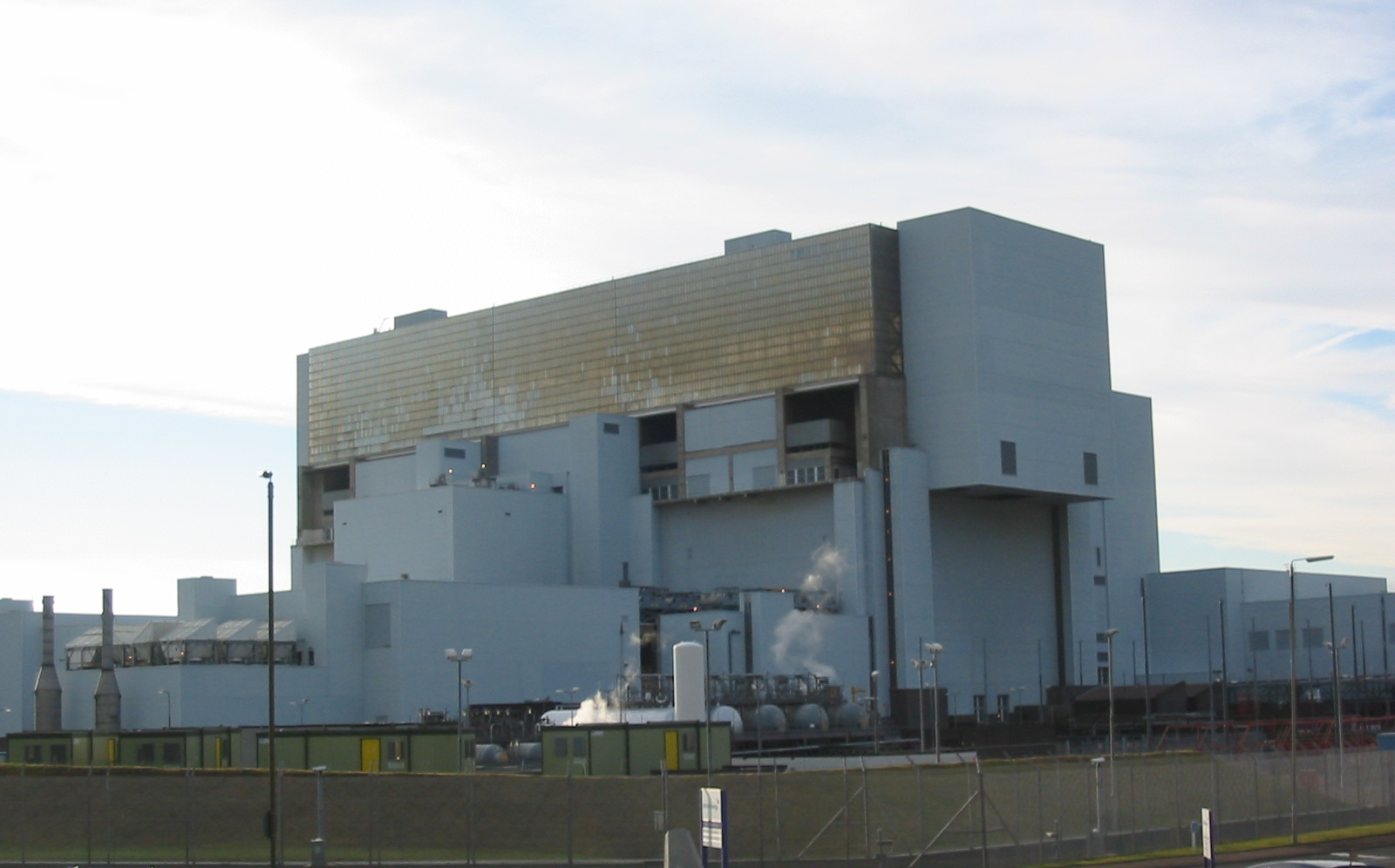
The Torness nuclear power station – an AGR

- Gas-cooled reactor (GCR) and advanced gas-cooled reactor (AGR) [moderator: graphite; coolant: carbon dioxide]

These designs have a higher thermal efficiency than PWRs due to higher operating temperatures. There are several operating reactors of this design, mostly in the United Kingdom, where the concept was developed. Older designs (i.e., Magnox stations) are either shut down or will be in the near future. However, the AGRs have an anticipated life of a further 10 to 20 years. This is a thermal-neutron reactor design. Decommissioning costs can be high due to the large volume of the reactor core.

- Liquid-metal fast-breeder reactor (LMFBR) [moderator: none; coolant: liquid metal]

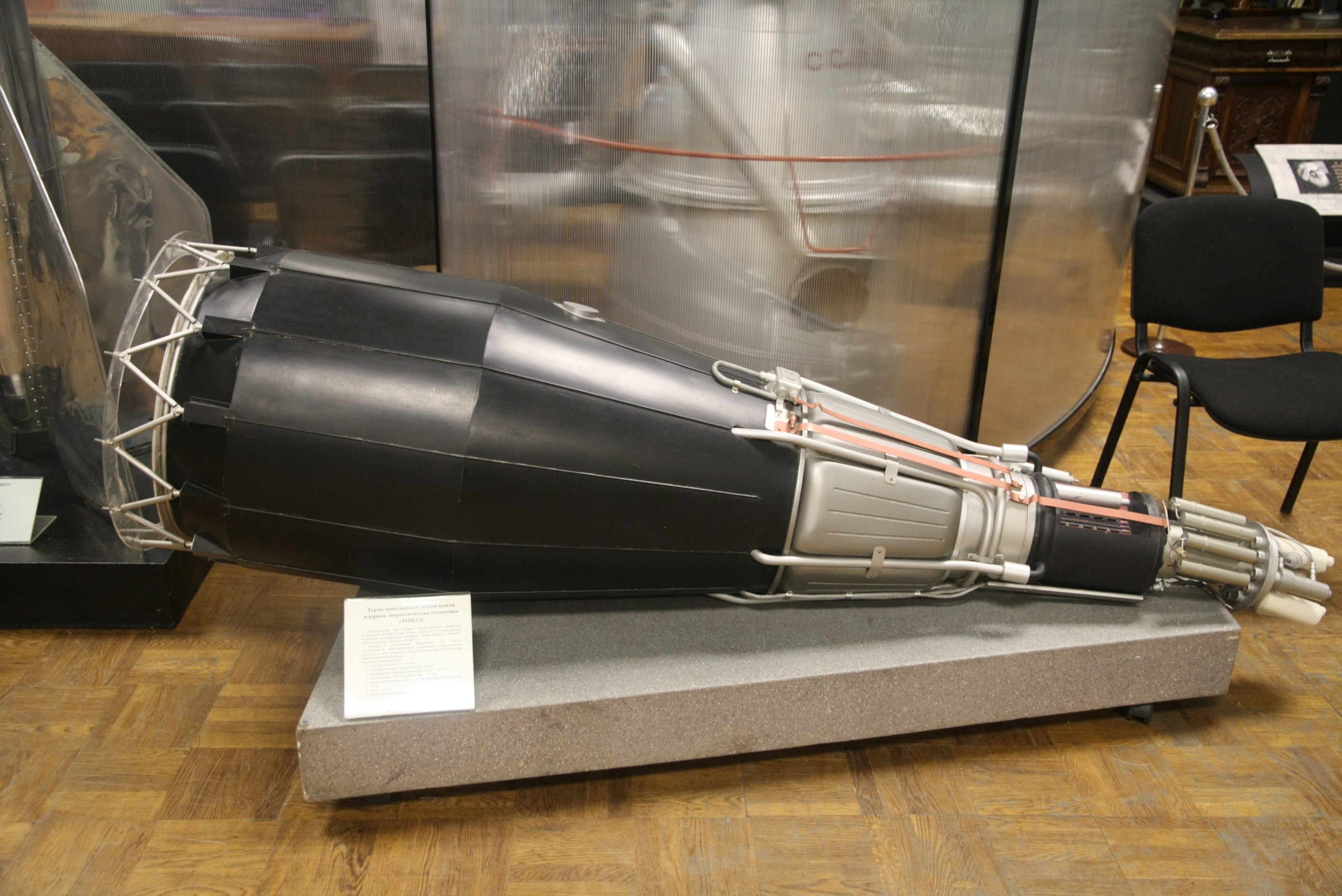
Scaled-down model of TOPAZ nuclear reactor

This totally unmoderated reactor design produces more fuel than it consumes. They are said to "breed" fuel because they produce fissionable fuel during operation due to neutron capture. These reactors can function much like a PWR in terms of efficiency, and do not require much high-pressure containment, as the liquid metal does not need to be kept at high pressure, even at very high temperatures. These reactors are fast neutron, not thermal neutron designs. These reactors come in two types:

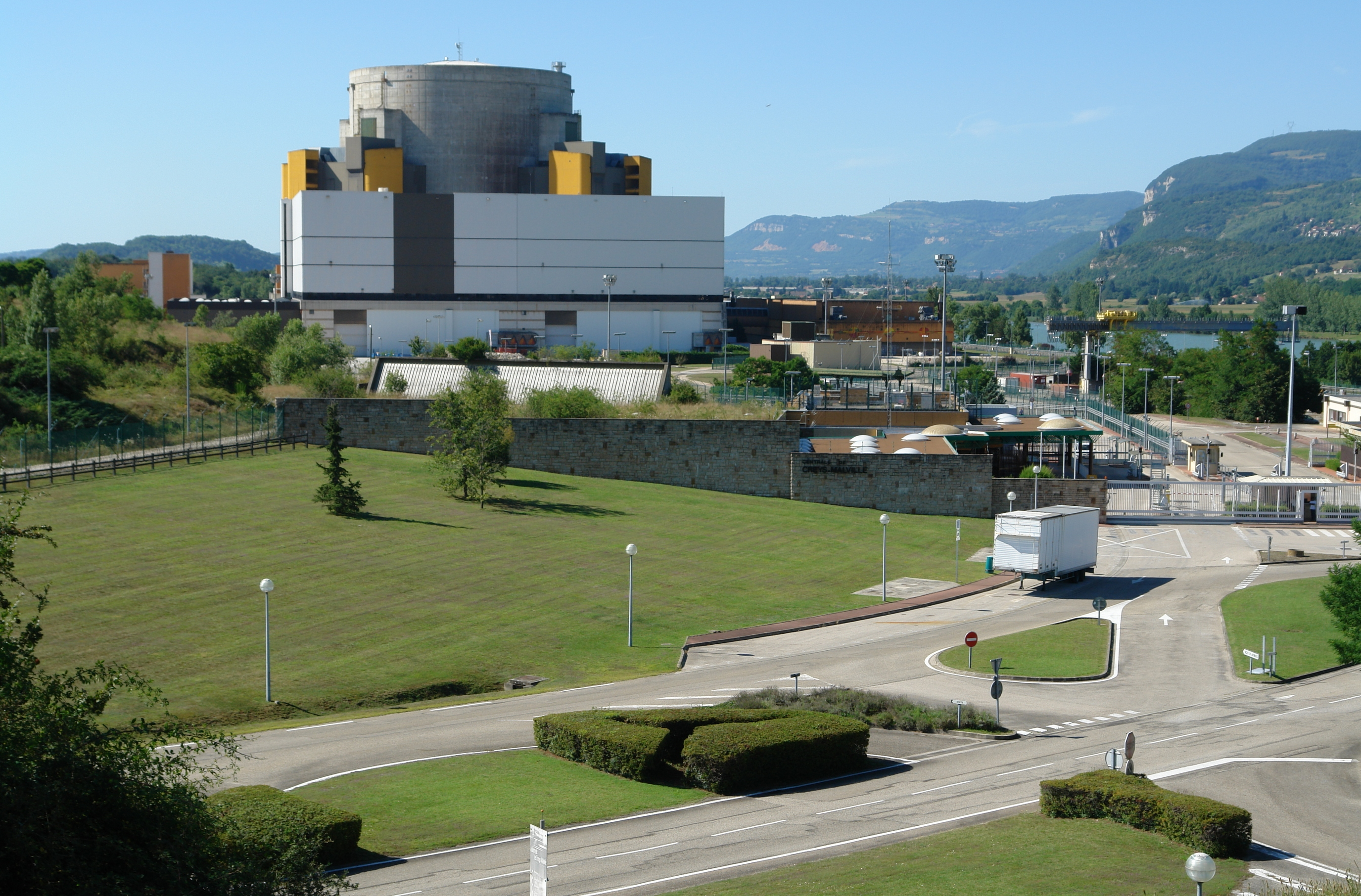
The Superphénix, closed in 1998, was one of the few FBRs

Lead-cooled

Using lead as the liquid metal provides excellent radiation shielding and allows for operation at very high temperatures. Also, lead is mostly transparent to neutrons, so fewer neutrons are lost in the coolant, and the coolant does not become radioactive. Unlike sodium, lead is mostly inert, so there is less risk of explosion or accident, but such large quantities of lead may be problematic from toxicology and disposal points of view. Often a reactor of this type would use a lead-bismuth eutectic mixture. In this case, the bismuth would present some minor radiation problems, as it is not quite as transparent to neutrons, and can be transmuted to a radioactive isotope more readily than lead. The Russian Alfa class submarine uses a lead-bismuth-cooled fast reactor as its main power plant.

Sodium-cooled

Most LMFBRs are of this type. The TOPAZ, BN-350 and BN-600 in the USSR; Superphénix in France; and Fermi-I in the United States were reactors of this type. The sodium is relatively easy to obtain and work with, and it also helps prevent corrosion on the various reactor parts immersed in it. However, sodium explodes violently when exposed to water, so care must be taken, but such explosions would not be more violent than (for example) a leak of superheated fluid from a pressurized-water reactor. The Monju reactor in Japan suffered a sodium leak in 1995 and could not be restarted until May 2010. The EBR-I, the first reactor to have a core meltdown (in 1955), was also a sodium-cooled reactor.

- Pebble-bed reactors (PBR) [moderator: graphite; coolant: helium]

These use fuel molded into ceramic balls, and then circulate gas through the balls. The result is an efficient, low-maintenance, very safe reactor with inexpensive, standardized fuel. The prototypes were the AVR and the THTR-300 in Germany, which produced up to 308MW of electricity between 1985 and 1989 until it was shut down after experiencing a series of incidents and technical difficulties. The HTR-10 prototype began operation in China in 2003, where it was subsequently developed into the HTR-PM. In 2021 the HTR-PM became the first Generation IV reactor to begin operation, and the first to enter commercial use in 2023.

- Molten-salt reactors (MSR) [moderator: graphite, or none for fast spectrum MSRs; coolant: molten salt mixture]

These dissolve the fuels in fluoride or chloride salts, or use such salts for coolant. MSRs potentially have many safety features, including the absence of high pressures or highly flammable components in the core. They were initially designed for aircraft propulsion due to their high efficiency and high power density. One prototype, the Molten-Salt Reactor Experiment (MSRE), was built to confirm the feasibility of the Liquid fluoride thorium reactor, a thermal spectrum reactor which would breed fissile uranium-233 fuel from thorium. Although the MSRE was shut down in 1969, its research contributed to the design being taken up again in the TSMR-LF1 project, which achieved criticality in 2023.

- Aqueous homogeneous reactor (AHR) [moderator: high-pressure light or heavy water; coolant: high-pressure light or heavy water]

For fuel, these reactors use soluble nuclear salts (usually uranium sulfate or uranium nitrate) dissolved in water and mixed with the coolant and the moderator. As of April 2006, only five AHRs were in operation.

=== Future and developing technologies ===
==== Advanced reactors ====
More than a dozen advanced reactor designs are in various stages of development. Some are evolutionary from the PWR, BWR and PHWR designs above, and some are more radical departures. The former include the advanced boiling water reactor (ABWR), two of which are now operating with others under construction, and the planned passively safe Economic Simplified Boiling Water Reactor (ESBWR) and AP1000 units (see Nuclear Power 2010 Program).

- The integral fast reactor (IFR) was built, tested, and evaluated during the 1980s and then retired under the Clinton administration in the 1990s due to the administration's nuclear non-proliferation policies. Recycling spent fuel is the foundation of its design; it therefore produces a fraction of the waste of current reactors.
- The pebble-bed reactor, a high-temperature gas-cooled reactor (HTGCR), is designed so high temperatures reduce power output by Doppler broadening of the fuel's neutron cross-section. It uses ceramic fuels so its safe operating temperatures exceed the power-reduction temperature range. Most designs are cooled by inert helium. Helium is not subject to steam explosions, resists neutron absorption leading to radioactivity, and does not dissolve contaminants that can become radioactive. Typical designs have more layers (up to 7) of passive containment than light water reactors (usually 3). A unique feature that may aid safety is that the fuel balls actually form the core's mechanism, and are replaced one by one as they age. The design of the fuel makes fuel reprocessing expensive.
- The small, sealed, transportable, autonomous reactor (SSTAR) is being primarily researched and developed in the US, intended as a passively safe fast-breeder reactor. It could also be remotely shut down if it is suspected of being tampered with.
- The Clean and Environmentally Safe Advanced Reactor (CAESAR) is a nuclear reactor concept that uses steam as a moderator – this design is in development.
- The reduced moderation water reactor builds upon the Advanced boiling water reactor ABWR) that is presently in use. It is not a complete fast reactor; it instead uses mostly epithermal neutrons, which are between thermal and fast neutrons in speed.
- The hydrogen-moderated self-regulating nuclear power module (HPM) is a reactor design emanating from the Los Alamos National Laboratory that uses uranium hydride as fuel.
- Subcritical reactors are designed to be safer and more stable, but pose a number of engineering and economic difficulties. One example reactor is the energy amplifier.
- Thorium-based reactors – It is possible to convert Thorium-232 into U-233 in reactors specially designed for the purpose. In this way, thorium, which is four times more abundant than uranium, can be used to breed U-233 nuclear fuel. U-233 is also believed to have favourable nuclear properties as compared to traditionally used U-235, including better neutron economy and lower production of long-lived transuranic waste.
  - Advanced heavy-water reactor (AHWR) – A proposed heavy-water-moderated nuclear power reactor that will be the next-generation design of the PHWR type. Under development in the Bhabha Atomic Research Centre (BARC), India.
  - KAMINI – A unique reactor using the uranium-233 isotope for fuel. Built in India by BARC and Indira Gandhi Center for Atomic Research (IGCAR).
  - India is also planning to build fast-breeder reactors using the thorium–uranium-233 fuel cycle. The FBTR (Fast Breeder Test Reactor) in operation at Kalpakkam (India) uses plutonium as a fuel and liquid sodium as a coolant.
  - China, which has control of the Cerro Impacto deposit, has a reactor and hopes to replace coal energy with nuclear energy.

Rolls-Royce aims to sell nuclear reactors for the production of synfuel for aircraft.

==== Generation IV reactors ====
Generation IV reactors are a set of theoretical nuclear reactor designs. These are generally not expected to be available for commercial use before 2040–2050, although the World Nuclear Association suggested that some might enter commercial operation before 2030. Current reactors in operation around the world are generally considered second- or third-generation systems, with the first-generation systems having been retired some time ago. Research into these reactor types was officially started by the Generation IV International Forum (GIF) based on eight technology goals. The primary goals were to improve nuclear safety, improve proliferation resistance, minimize waste and natural resource use, and decrease the cost to build and run such plants.

- Gas-cooled fast reactor
- Lead-cooled fast reactor
- Molten-salt reactor
- Sodium-cooled fast reactor
- Supercritical water reactor
- Very-high-temperature reactor

==== Generation V+ reactors ====
Generation V reactors are designs that are theoretically possible but not being actively considered or researched at present. Although some Generation V reactors could potentially be built with current or near-term technology, they trigger little interest for reasons of economics, practicality, or safety.

- Liquid-core reactor. A closed-loop liquid-core nuclear reactor, where the fissile material is molten uranium or uranium solution cooled by a working gas pumped in through holes in the base of the containment vessel.
- Gas-core reactor. A closed-loop version of the nuclear lightbulb rocket, where the fissile material is gaseous uranium hexafluoride contained in a fused silica vessel. A working gas (such as hydrogen) would flow around this vessel and absorb the UV light produced by the reaction. This reactor design could also function as a rocket engine, as featured in Harry Harrison's 1976 science-fiction novel Skyfall. In theory, using UF_{6} as a working fuel directly (rather than as a stage to one, as is done now) would mean lower processing costs, as well as very small reactors. In practice, running a reactor at such high power densities would likely produce neutron flux comparable to levels expected in fusion reactors. Because such flux would weaken most reactor materials, this design would require materials similar to those selected by the International Fusion Materials Irradiation Facility.
  - Gas core EM reactor. Similar to the gas core reactor, but with photovoltaic arrays converting the UV light directly to electricity. This approach is similar to the experimentally proven photoelectric effect that would convert the X-rays generated from aneutronic fusion into electricity by passing the high-energy photons through an array of conducting foils to transfer some of their energy to electrons. The energy of the photon is captured electrostatically, similar to a capacitor. Since X-rays can go through far greater material thickness than electrons, many hundreds or thousands of layers are needed to absorb the X-rays.
- Fission fragment reactor. A fission fragment reactor is a nuclear reactor that generates electricity by decelerating an ion beam of fission byproducts instead of using nuclear reactions to generate heat. By doing so, it bypasses the Carnot cycle and can achieve efficiencies of up to 90% instead of 40–45% attainable by efficient turbine-driven thermal reactors. The fission fragment ion beam would be passed through a magnetohydrodynamic generator to produce electricity.
- Hybrid nuclear fusion. Would use the neutrons emitted by fusion to fission a blanket of fertile material, like U-238 or Th-232, and transmute other reactors' spent nuclear fuel/nuclear waste into relatively more benign isotopes.

==== Fusion reactors ====
In principle, controlled nuclear fusion could be used in fusion power plants to produce power without the complexities of handling actinides, but significant scientific and technical obstacles remain. Despite research having started in the 1950s, no commercial fusion reactor is expected before 2050. The ITER project is currently leading the effort to harness fusion power.

== Nuclear fuel cycle ==
Thermal reactors generally depend on refined and enriched uranium. Some nuclear reactors can operate with a mixture of plutonium and uranium (see MOX). The process by which uranium ore is mined, processed, enriched, used, possibly reprocessed, and disposed of is known as the nuclear fuel cycle.

Under 1% of the uranium found in nature is the easily fissionable U-235 isotope, and as a result, most reactor designs require enriched fuel. Enrichment involves increasing the percentage of U-235 and is usually done by means of gaseous diffusion or gas centrifugation. The enriched result is then converted into uranium dioxide powder, which is pressed and fired into pellet form. These pellets are stacked into tubes, which are then sealed and called fuel rods. Many of these fuel rods are used in each nuclear reactor.

Most BWR and PWR commercial reactors use uranium enriched to about 4% U-235, and some commercial reactors with a high neutron economy do not require the fuel to be enriched at all (that is, they can use natural uranium). According to the International Atomic Energy Agency, there are at least 100 research reactors in the world fueled by highly enriched (weapons-grade/90% enrichment) uranium. Theft risk of this fuel (potentially used in the production of a nuclear weapon) has led to campaigns advocating conversion of this type of reactor to low-enrichment uranium (which poses less threat of proliferation).

Fissile U-235 and non-fissile but fissionable and fertile U-238 are both used in the fission process. U-235 is fissionable by thermal (i.e., slow-moving) neutrons. A thermal neutron moves about the same speed as the atoms around it. Since all atoms vibrate proportionally to their absolute temperature, a thermal neutron has the best opportunity to fission U-235 when it is moving at this same vibrational speed. On the other hand, U-238 is more likely to capture a neutron when the neutron is moving very fast. This U-239 atom will soon decay into plutonium-239, which is another fuel. Pu-239 is a viable fuel and must be accounted for even when a highly enriched uranium fuel is used. Plutonium fissions will dominate the U-235 fissions in some reactors, especially after the initial loading of U-235 is spent. Plutonium is fissionable with both fast and thermal neutrons, which makes it ideal for either nuclear reactors or nuclear bombs.

Most reactor designs in existence are thermal reactors and typically use water as a neutron moderator (moderator means that it slows down the neutron to a thermal speed) and as a coolant. But in a fast-breeder reactor, some other kind of coolant is used which will not moderate or slow the neutrons down much. This enables fast neutrons to dominate, which can effectively be used to constantly replenish the fuel supply. By merely placing cheap unenriched uranium into such a core, the non-fissionable U-238 will be turned into Pu-239, "breeding" fuel.

In a thorium fuel cycle, thorium-232 absorbs a neutron in either a fast or thermal reactor. The thorium-233 beta decays to protactinium-233 and then to uranium-233, which in turn is used as fuel. Hence, like uranium-238, thorium-232 is a fertile material. The thorium fuel cycle is considered to be more resistant to nuclear proliferation than uranium or MOX cycles, but has not been widely adopted.

=== Fueling of nuclear reactors ===
The amount of energy in the reservoir of nuclear fuel is frequently expressed in terms of "full-power days," which is the number of 24-hour periods (days) a reactor is scheduled for operation at full power output for the generation of heat energy. The number of full-power days in a reactor's operating cycle (between refueling outage times) is related to the amount of fissile uranium-235 (U-235) contained in the fuel assemblies at the beginning of the cycle. A higher percentage of U-235 in the core at the beginning of a cycle will permit the reactor to be run for a greater number of full-power days.

At the end of the operating cycle, the fuel in some of the assemblies is "spent", having spent four to six years in the reactor producing power. This spent fuel is discharged and replaced with new (fresh) fuel assemblies. Though considered "spent," these fuel assemblies contain a large quantity of fuel. In practice, it is economics that determines the lifetime of nuclear fuel in a reactor. Long before all possible fission has taken place, the reactor is unable to maintain 100% (full output power), and therefore, income for the utility lowers as plant output power lowers. Most nuclear plants operate at a very low profit margin due to operating overhead, mainly regulatory costs, so operating below 100% power is not economically viable for very long. The fraction of the reactor's fuel core replaced during refueling is typically one-third, but depends on how long the plant operates between refueling. Plants typically operate on 18-month refueling cycles, or 24-month refueling cycles. This means that one refueling, replacing only one-third of the fuel, can keep a nuclear reactor at full power for nearly two years.

The disposition and storage of this spent fuel is one of the most challenging aspects of commercial nuclear power plant operation. This nuclear waste is highly radioactive, and its toxicity presents a danger for thousands of years. After being discharged from the reactor, spent nuclear fuel is transferred to the on-site spent fuel pool. The spent fuel pool is a large pool of water that provides cooling and shielding of the spent nuclear fuel and also limits radiation exposure to on-site personnel. Once the energy has decayed somewhat (approximately five years), the fuel can be transferred from the fuel pool to dry shielded casks that can be safely stored for thousands of years. After loading into dry shielded casks, the casks are stored on-site in a specially guarded facility in impervious concrete bunkers. On-site fuel storage facilities are designed to withstand the impact of commercial airliners, with little to no damage to the spent fuel. An average on-site fuel storage facility can hold 30 years of spent fuel in a space smaller than a football field.

Not all reactors need to be shut down for refueling; for example, pebble bed reactors, RBMK reactors, molten-salt reactors, Magnox, AGR and CANDU reactors allow fuel to be shifted through the reactor while it is running. In a CANDU reactor, this also allows individual fuel elements to be situated within the reactor core that are best suited to the amount of U-235 in the fuel element.

The amount of energy extracted from nuclear fuel is called its burnup, which is expressed in terms of the heat energy produced per initial unit of fuel weight. Burnup is commonly expressed as megawatt-days thermal per metric ton of initial heavy metal.

== Nuclear safety ==
Nuclear safety covers the actions taken to prevent nuclear and radiation accidents and incidents or to limit their consequences. The nuclear power industry has improved the safety and performance of reactors, and has proposed new, safer (though generally untested) reactor designs. There is no guarantee that the reactors will be designed, built, and operated correctly. Mistakes do occur, and the designers of reactors at Fukushima in Japan did not anticipate that a tsunami generated by an earthquake would disable the backup systems that were supposed to stabilize the reactor after the earthquake, despite multiple warnings by the NRG and the Japanese nuclear safety administration. According to UBS AG, the Fukushima I nuclear accidents have cast doubt on whether even an advanced economy like Japan can master nuclear safety. Catastrophic scenarios involving terrorist attacks are also conceivable. An interdisciplinary team from MIT has estimated that given the expected growth of nuclear power from 2005 to 2055, at least four serious nuclear accidents would be expected in that period.

== Nuclear accidents ==
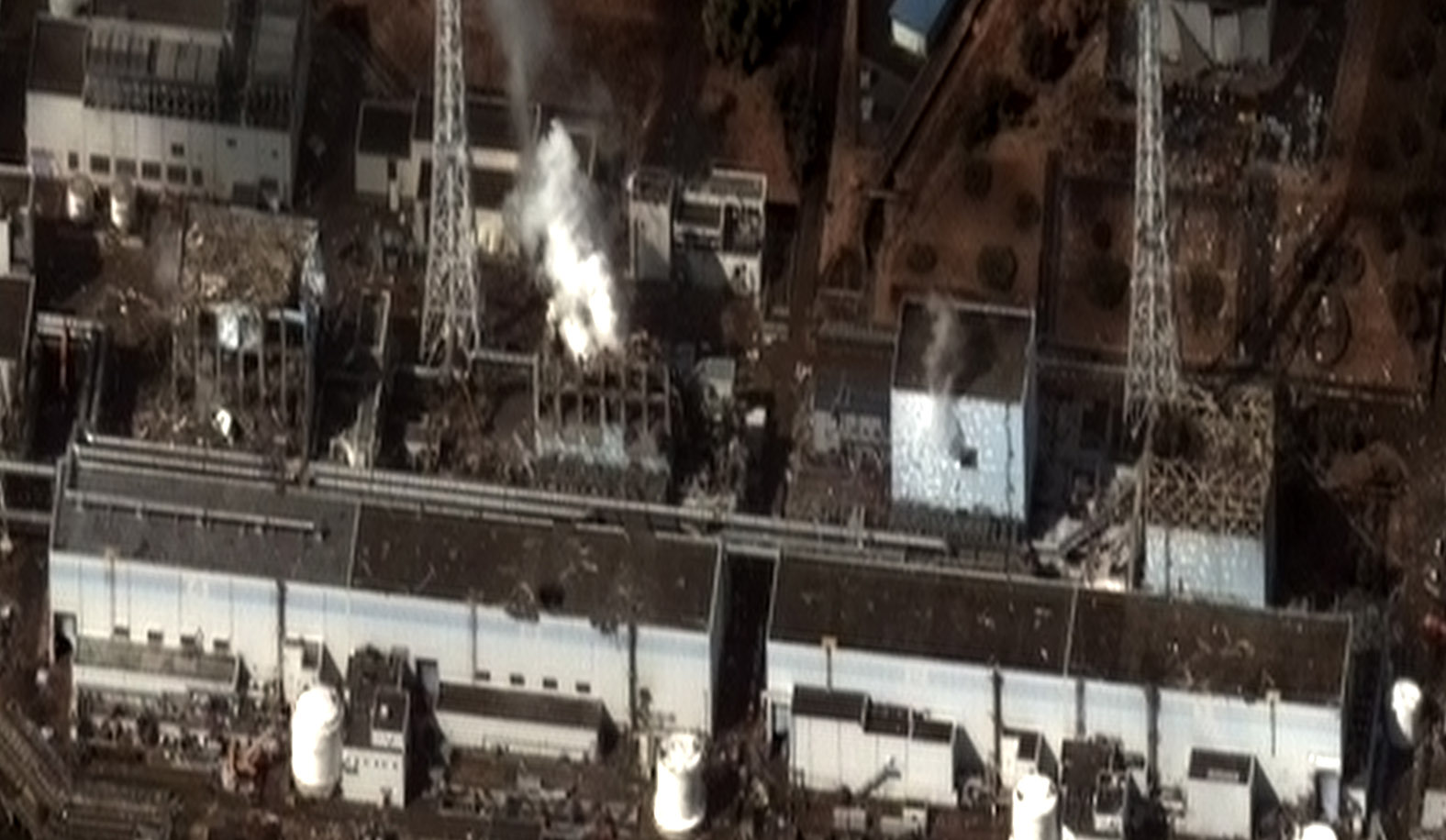
Three of the reactors at Fukushima I overheated, causing the coolant water to dissociate and leading to the hydrogen explosions. This, along with fuel meltdowns, released large amounts of radioactive material into the air.

Serious, though rare, nuclear and radiation accidents have occurred. These include the Windscale fire (October 1957), the SL-1 accident (1961), the Three Mile Island accident (1979), Chernobyl disaster (April 1986), and the Fukushima Daiichi nuclear disaster (March 2011). Nuclear-powered submarine mishaps include the K-19 reactor accident (1961), the K-27 reactor accident (1968), and the K-431 reactor accident (1985).

Nuclear reactors have been launched into Earth orbit at least 34 times. A number of incidents were connected with the unmanned nuclear-reactor-powered Soviet RORSAT, especially the Kosmos 954 radar satellite, which resulted in nuclear fuel reentering the Earth's atmosphere from orbit and being dispersed in northern Canada (January 1978).

== Natural nuclear reactors ==
Almost two billion years ago, a series of self-sustaining nuclear fission "reactors" self-assembled in the area now known as Oklo in Gabon, West Africa. The conditions at that place and time allowed a natural nuclear fission to occur with circumstances that are similar to the conditions in a constructed nuclear reactor. Fifteen fossil natural fission reactors have so far been found in three separate ore deposits at the Oklo uranium mine in Gabon. First discovered in 1972 by French physicist Francis Perrin, they are collectively known as the Oklo Fossil Reactors. Self-sustaining nuclear fission reactions took place in these reactors approximately 1.5 billion years ago, and ran for a few hundred thousand years, averaging 100 kW of power output during that time. The concept of a natural nuclear reactor was theorized as early as 1956 by Paul Kuroda at the University of Arkansas.

Such reactors can no longer form on Earth in its present geologic period. Radioactive decay of formerly more abundant uranium-235 over the time span of hundreds of millions of years has reduced the proportion of this naturally occurring fissile isotope to below the amount required to sustain a chain reaction with only plain water as a moderator.

The natural nuclear reactors formed when a uranium-rich mineral deposit became inundated with groundwater that acted as a neutron moderator, and a strong chain reaction took place. The water moderator would boil away as the reaction increased, slowing it back down again and preventing a meltdown. The fission reaction was sustained for hundreds of thousands of years, cycling on the order of hours to a few days.

These natural reactors are extensively studied by scientists interested in geologic radioactive waste disposal. They offer a case study of how radioactive isotopes migrate through the Earth's crust. This is a significant area of controversy as opponents of geologic waste disposal fear that isotopes from stored waste could end up in water supplies or be carried into the environment.

== Emissions ==
Nuclear reactors produce tritium as part of normal operations, which is eventually released into the environment in trace quantities.

As an isotope of hydrogen, tritium (T) frequently binds to oxygen and forms T_{2}O. This molecule is chemically identical to H_{2}O and so is both colorless and odorless; however, the additional neutrons in the hydrogen nuclei cause the tritium to undergo beta decay with a half-life of 12.3 years. Despite being measurable, the tritium released by nuclear power plants is minimal. The United States NRC estimates that a person drinking water for one year out of a well contaminated by what they would consider to be a significant tritiated water spill would receive a radiation dose of 0.3 millirem. For comparison, this is an order of magnitude less than the 4 millirem a person receives on a round trip flight from Washington, D.C. to Los Angeles, a consequence of less atmospheric protection against highly energetic cosmic rays at high altitudes.

The amounts of strontium-90 released from nuclear power plants under normal operations are undetectable above natural background radiation. Detectable strontium-90 in groundwater and the general environment can be traced to weapons testing that occurred during the mid-20th century (accounting for 99% of the strontium-90 in the environment) and the Chernobyl accident (accounting for the remaining 1%).

== See also ==
- Neutron transport – Study of motions and interactions of neutrons
- Nuclear decommissioning – Process of dismantling a nuclear facility
- Nuclear power by country
- Nuclear power in space – Space exploration using nuclear energy
- Safety engineering – Engineering discipline

Generator types

- Nuclear microreactor – Very small nuclear reactor of 1-20 MW capacity
- Radioisotope thermoelectric generator – Electrical generator that uses heat from radioactive decay
- Small modular reactor – Type of nuclear fission reactor
- Thorium-based nuclear power – Nuclear energy extracted from thorium isotopes
- Traveling-wave reactor (TWR) – Type of nuclear fission reactor

Organisations, publications, and campaigns

- One Less Nuclear Power Plant – Seoul's energy policy launched in April 2012
- Sayonara Nuclear Power Plants
- World Nuclear Industry Status Report

Lists

- List of small modular reactor designs
