= Nuclear lightbulb =

Hypothetical type of spacecraft

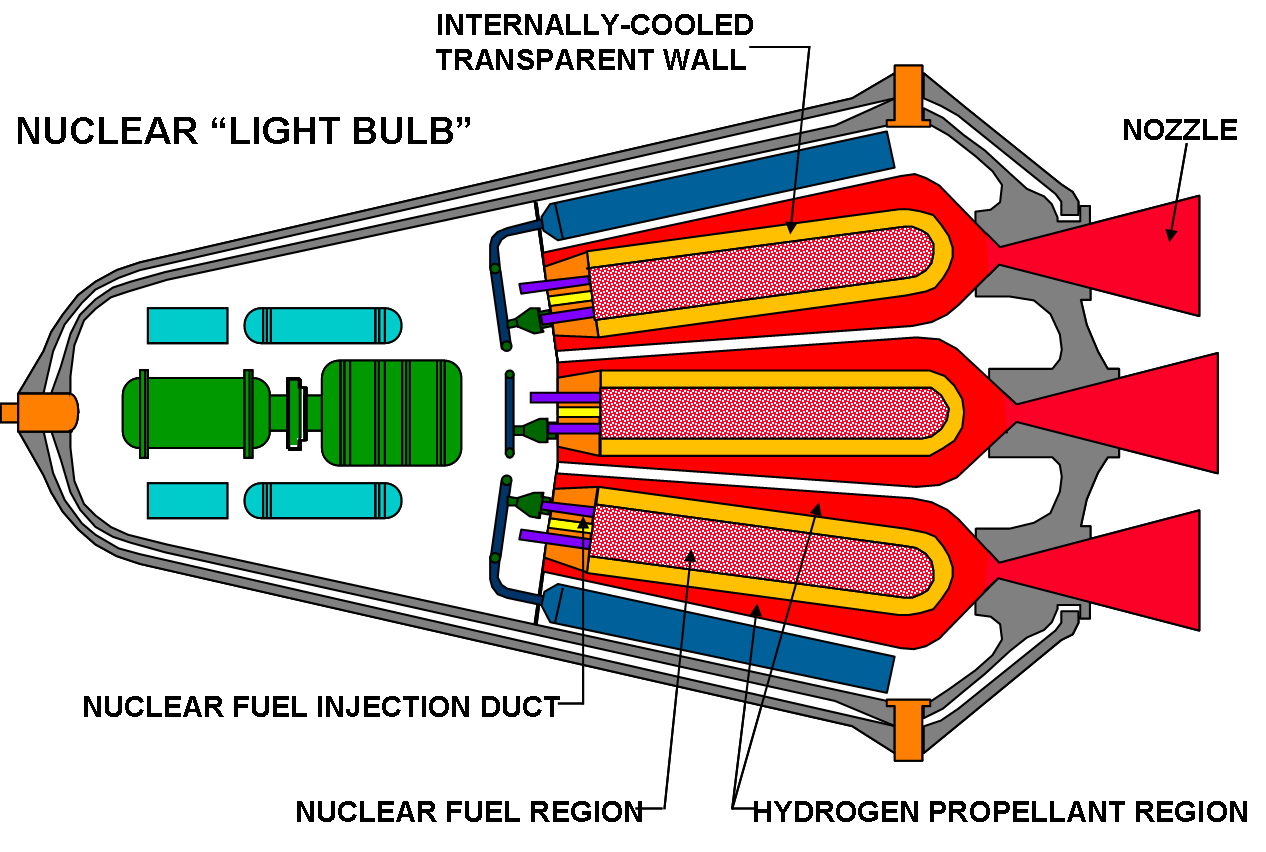
Illustrated diagram of a closed-cycle gas-core nuclear-thermal rocket ("nuclear lightbulb").

A nuclear lightbulb is a hypothetical type of spacecraft engine using a gaseous fission reactor to achieve nuclear propulsion. Specifically, it would be a type of gas core reactor rocket that uses a quartz wall to separate the nuclear fuel from the coolant and propellant. It would be operated at temperatures of up to 22,000°C where the vast majority of the electromagnetic emissions are in the hard ultraviolet range. Fused silica is almost completely transparent to this light, so it would be used to contain the uranium hexafluoride and allow the light to heat reaction mass in a rocket or to generate electricity using a heat engine or photovoltaics.

== Rocket engine ==
Like all nuclear rocket designs, the nuclear lightbulb can greatly exceed the exhaust speed and specific impulse of a chemical rocket. However, it also does not involve the release of any radioactive material from the rocket, unlike open cycle designs which would cause nuclear fallout if used in a planetary atmosphere (e.g. Project Orion). The theoretical specific impulse (I_{sp}) range from 1500 to 3000 seconds.

== Electrical power generation ==
As a method to generate electricity, nuclear lightbulbs are extremely efficient because higher-temperature heat contains more Gibbs free energy than the low-temperature heat produced in current fossil-fuel plants and water-cooled nuclear reactors.
