= Gaseous fission reactor =

Type of nuclear reactor

A gas core reactor, and the very closely related vapor core reactor, is a proposed kind of nuclear reactor in which the nuclear fuel would be in a gaseous state rather than liquid or solid. In this type of reactor, the only temperature-limiting materials would be the reactor walls, and with appropriate cooling of the walls, the reactor can run at much higher temperatures. Conventional reactors have stricter limitations because the core would melt if the fuel temperature were to rise too high.

There are two proposed roles for the concept, for nuclear power electrical generation, and as an advanced rocket engine. In the former, the advantage to the design is that it directly produces a high-velocity stream of partially ionized gas. This can be used to power a magnetohydrodynamic generator (MHD), which can operate with efficiencies roughly double that of the traditional liquid-cooled reactors which use the Rankine cycle and reach about 35% efficiency. The complexity of the design and the failure to design successful cost-effective MHD devices led to this concept being dropped by the early 1980s. For the rocket role, the highly-energetic exhaust is expanded through a nozzle to produce thrust. Because of the very high energy content, a gas core reactor rocket will have much higher performance than even the best possible liquid rocket propellants, or alternative nuclear designs using a solid or liquid core.

Depending on the source, this basic concept may be known as a gas fueled reactor, gas nuclear reactor, gaseous fission reactor, and variations on these names. The related "vapor" design differs only in that the initial fuel is partially or entirely in the form of aerosol droplets rather than gas.

== Theory of operation ==
The vapor core reactor (VCR), also called a gas core reactor (GCR), has been studied for some time. It would have a gas or vapor core composed of uranium tetrafluoride (UF_{4}) with some helium (^{4}He) added to increase the electrical conductivity, the vapor core may also have tiny UF_{4} droplets in it. It has both terrestrial and space based applications. Since the space concept doesn't necessarily have to be economical in the traditional sense, it allows the enrichment to exceed what would be acceptable for a terrestrial system. It also allows for a higher ratio of UF_{4} to helium, which in the terrestrial version would be kept just high enough to ensure criticality in order to increase the efficiency of direct conversion. The terrestrial version is designed for a vapor core inlet temperature of about 1500 K and exit temperature of 2500 K and a UF_{4}-to-helium ratio of around 20% to 60%. It is thought that the outlet temperature could be raised to that of the 8000 K to 15000 K range where the exhaust would be a fission-generated non-equilibrium electron gas, which would be of much more importance for a rocket design. A terrestrial version of the VCR's flow schematic can be found in reference 2 and in the summary of non-classical nuclear systems in the second external link. The space based concept would be cut off at the end of the MHD channel.

== Reasoning for He-4 addition ==
^{4}He may be used in increase the ability of the design to extract energy and be controlled. A few sentences from Anghaie et al. sheds light on the reasoning:

"The power density in the MHD duct is proportional to the product of electrical conductivity, velocity squared and magnetic field squared σv^{2}B^{2}. Therefore, the enthalpy extraction is very sensitive to the MHD input-output fluid conditions. The vapor core reactor provides a hotter-than-most fluid with potential for adequate thermal equilibrium conductivity and duct velocities. Considering the product v^{2} × B^{2}, it is apparent that a light working fluid should dominate the thermal properties and the UF_{4} fraction should be small. Additional electrical conductivity enhancement might be needed from thermal ionization of suitable seed materials, and from non-equilibrium ionization by fission fragments and other ionizing radiation produced by the fissioning process."

== Spacecraft ==
The spacecraft variant of the gaseous fission reactor is called the gas core reactor rocket. There are two approaches: the open and closed cycle. In the open cycle, the propellant, most likely hydrogen, is fed to the reactor, heated up by the nuclear reaction in the reactor, and exits out the other end. Unfortunately, the propellant will be contaminated by fuel and fission products, and although the problem can be mitigated by engineering the hydrodynamics within the reactor, it renders the rocket design completely unsuitable for use in atmosphere.

One might attempt to circumvent the problem by confining the fission fuel magnetically, in a manner similar to the fusion fuel in a tokamak. Unfortunately it is not likely that this arrangement will actually work to contain the fuel, since the ratio of ionization to particle momentum is not favourable. Whereas a tokamak would generally work to contain singly ionized deuterium or tritium with a mass of two or three daltons, the uranium vapour would be at most triply ionized with a mass of 235 daltons. Since the force imparted by a magnetic field is proportional to the charge on the particle, and the acceleration is proportional to the force divided by the mass of the particle, the magnets required to contain uranium gas would be impractically large; most such designs have focused on fuel cycles that do not depend upon retaining the fuel in the reactor.

In the closed cycle, the reaction is entirely shielded from the propellant. The reaction is contained in a quartz vessel and the propellant merely flows outside of it, being heated in an indirect fashion. The closed cycle avoids contamination because the propellant can't enter the reactor itself, but the solution carries a significant penalty to the rocket's specific impulse.

== Energy production ==
For energy production purposes, one might use a container located inside a solenoid. The container is filled with gaseous uranium hexafluoride, where the uranium is enriched, to a level just short of criticality. Afterward, the uranium hexafluoride is compressed by external means, thus initiating a nuclear chain reaction and a great amount of heat, which in turn causes an expansion of the uranium hexafluoride. Since the UF_{6} is contained within the vessel, it can't escape and thus compresses elsewhere. The result is a plasma wave moving in the container, and the solenoid converts some of its energy into electricity at an efficiency level of about 20%. In addition, the container must be cooled, and one can extract energy from the coolant by passing it through a heat exchanger and turbine system as in an ordinary thermal power plant.

However, there are enormous problems with corrosion during this arrangement, as the uranium hexafluoride is chemically very reactive.

== See also ==
- Gas core reactor rocket
- Spacecraft propulsion
