= Timeline of nuclear power =

This timeline of nuclear power is an incomplete chronological summary of significant events in the study and use of nuclear power. This is primarily limited to sustained fission and decay processes, and does not include detailed timelines of nuclear weapons development or fusion experiments.

== 1920s ==
- 1925
  - On February 2, Patrick Blackett publishes experimental results of the first nuclear transmutation, by the bombardment of a nitrogen nucleus with an alpha particle, producing an oxygen-17 nucleus and a proton, at Cavendish Laboratory, Cambridge.

== 1930s ==
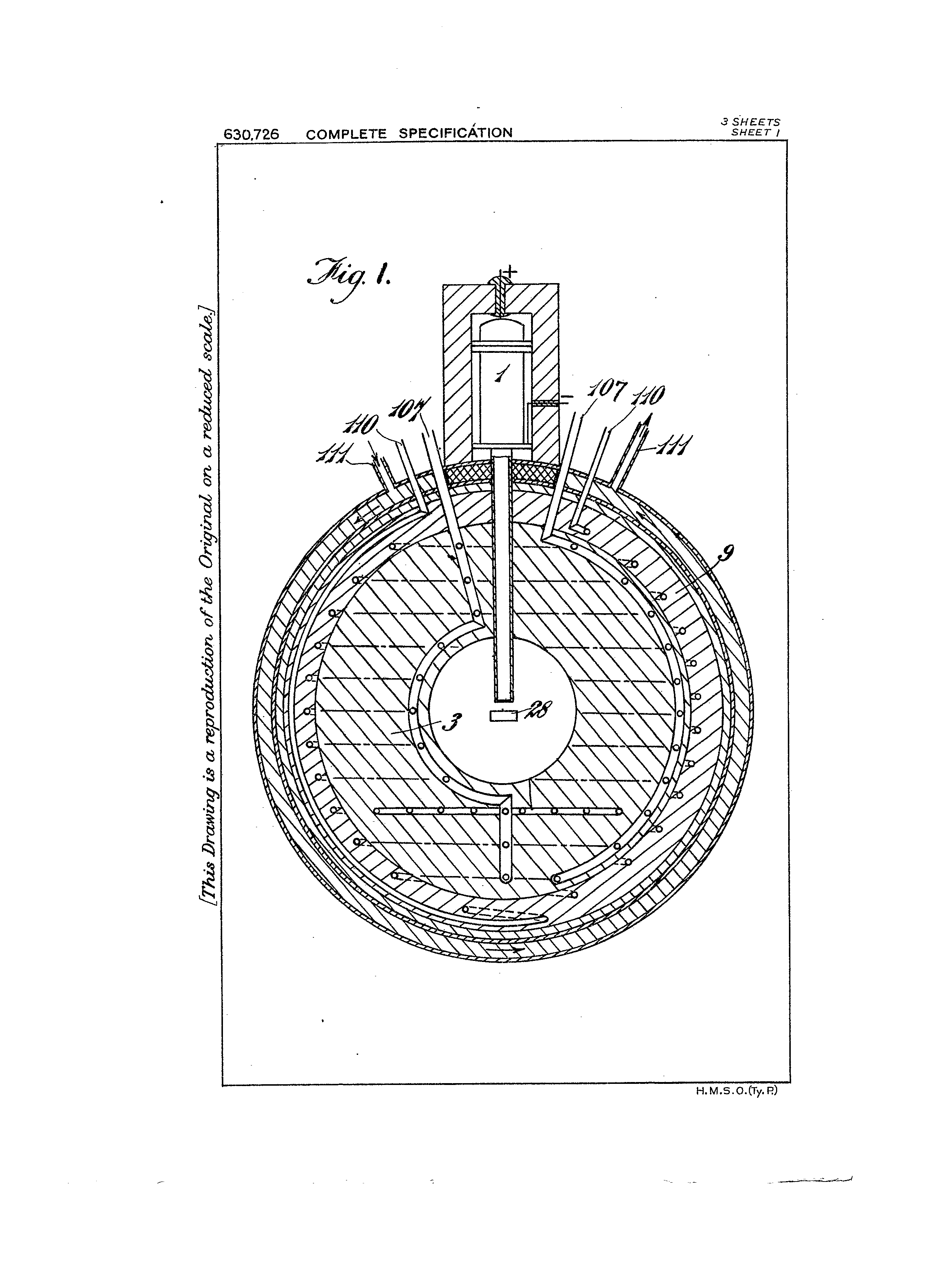
Leo Szilard's reactor patent
- 1931
  - On January 2, Ernest Lawrence and M. Stanley Livingston complete the first cyclotron, a type of circular particle accelerator. This early design is only 4.5 inches in diameter and yields a maximum proton energy of 80 keV.
- 1932
  - On January 1, Harold Urey, Ferdinand Brickwedde, and George M Murphy publish the discovery of deuterium. It is spectroscopically identified following separation from a sample of cryogenic liquid hydrogen at Columbia University, New York. Like all nuclei, preceding the discovery of the neutron, it is assumed to be composed entirely of protons and hypothetical "nuclear electrons".
  - On February 27, James Chadwick publishes the discovery of the neutron, identified as the "beryllium radiation" emitted under alpha-particle bombardment, previously observed by Irène Joliot-Curie and Frédéric Joliot-Curie.
  - On April 30, John Cockcroft and Ernest Walton publish the first disintegration of an atomic nucleus, popularly described as splitting the atom. They report the production of two alpha particles from the bombardment of lithium-7 nuclei by protons, using a Cockcroft–Walton generator at the University of Cambridge's Cavendish Laboratory. While in lithium this reaction is exothermic, nucleus disintegration is distinct from the undiscovered process of fission, which induces a radioactive decay.
- 1934
  - On June 24, Leo Szilard files the first patent for a nuclear reactor. The design, which predates the discovery of fission, resembles an accelerator-driven subcritical reactor, suggesting deuteron beam fusion interacting with indium, beryllium, bromine, or uranium as neutron-rich core materials.
  - Mikhail Alekseevich Eremeev completes the first cyclotron in the Soviet Union and in Europe, at the Leningrad Physico-Technical Institute. It is a small design based a prototype by Lawrence, with a 28 cm diameter capable of achieving 530 keV proton energies.
- 1935
  - In January, Vemork hydroelectric plant in Norway operates the first large-scale heavy water production site, pioneered by Leif Tronstad.
- 1937
  - In March, V. N. Rukavishnikov, Lev Mysovskii and Igor Kurchatov complete the first MeV cyclotron in the Soviet Union and in Europe, and outside the United States, at the V. G. Khlopin Radium Institute in Leningrad. It is a 100 cm (39 in) accelerator capable of achieving 3.2 MeV proton energies.
  - On April 3, Yoshio Nishina, Tameichi Yasaki, and Sukeo Watanabe complete the first cyclotron in Japan and in Asia, at the Riken laboratory in Tokyo. It is a 26-inch accelerator capable of achieving 2.9 MeV deuteron energies.
- 1938
  - In August, Niels Bohr, George de Hevesy, and August Krogh complete the first cyclotron in Denmark, at the Institute for Theoretical Physics of the University of Copenhagen.
- 1939
  - On February 11, Lise Meitner and Otto Frisch publish the discovery of nuclear fission, collaborating with Otto Hahn and Fritz Strassmann who previously identified barium following neutron bombardment of uranium, at the Kaiser Wilhelm Institute for Chemistry, Berlin. Meitner and Frisch, both Jewish, had already fled Nazi Germany to Stockholm and Copenhagen respectively, and were barred from co-publishing with their German colleagues under Nazi anti-Jewish legislation.
  - On March 8, Hans von Halban, Frédéric Joliot-Curie, Lew Kowarski, and Francis Perrin submit for publication the first net neutron production in an atomic pile. The experiment in Ivry-sur-Seine, Paris uses a 50-cm copper sphere filled with a uranyl nitrate water solution and a radium-beryllium neutron source.
  - On March 16, Herbert L. Anderson, Enrico Fermi, and H B Hanstein submit for publication the first pile neutron production in the United States, from pile Columbia number 1 at Columbia University, New York. The pile submerges a 13-cm glass bulb filled with uranium oxide in water acting as a moderator and reflector.
  - In March, Frédéric Joliot-Curie achieves a 7 MeV proton beam at the first cyclotron in France, at the Collège de France in Paris.

== 1940s ==
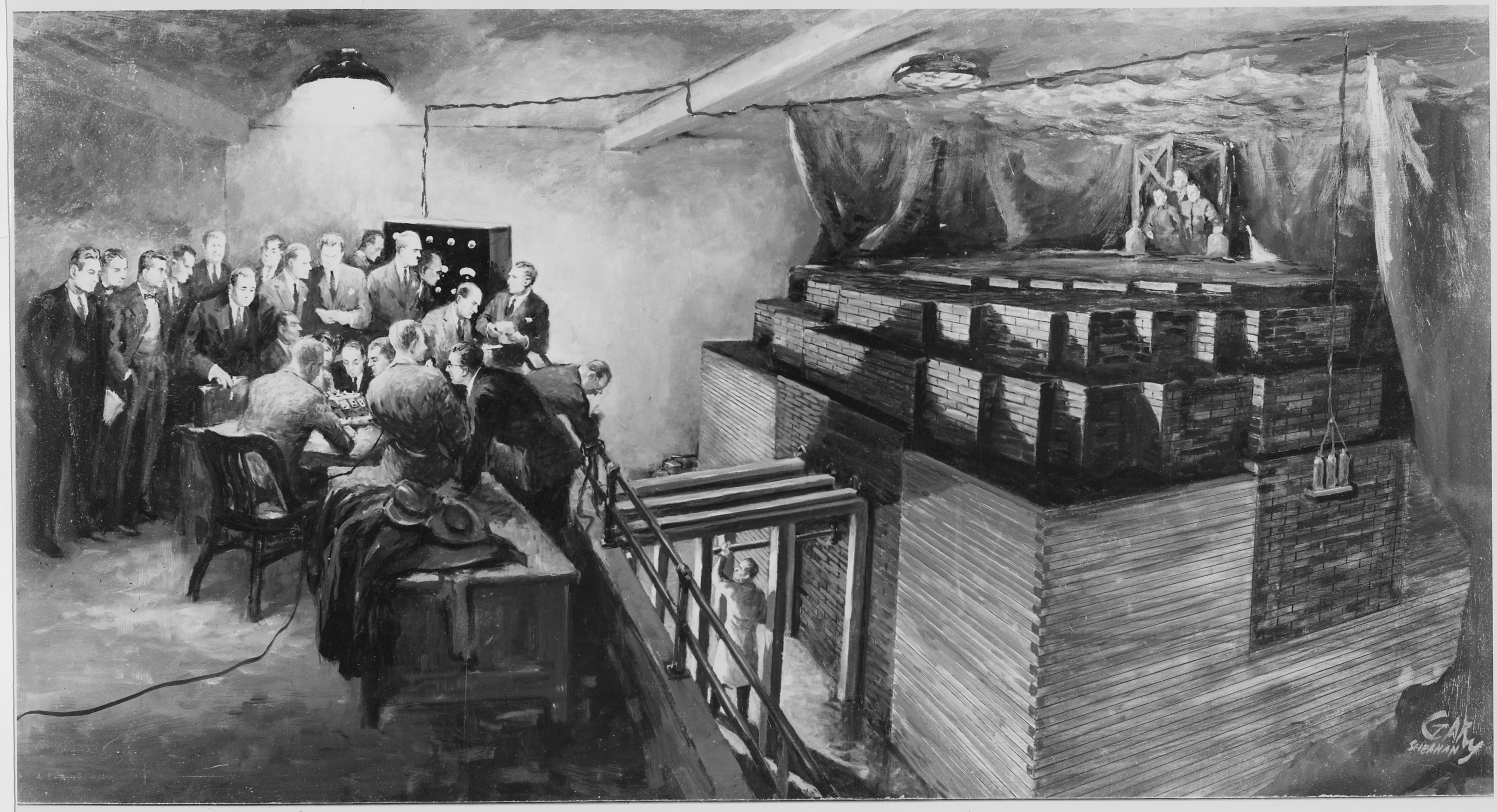
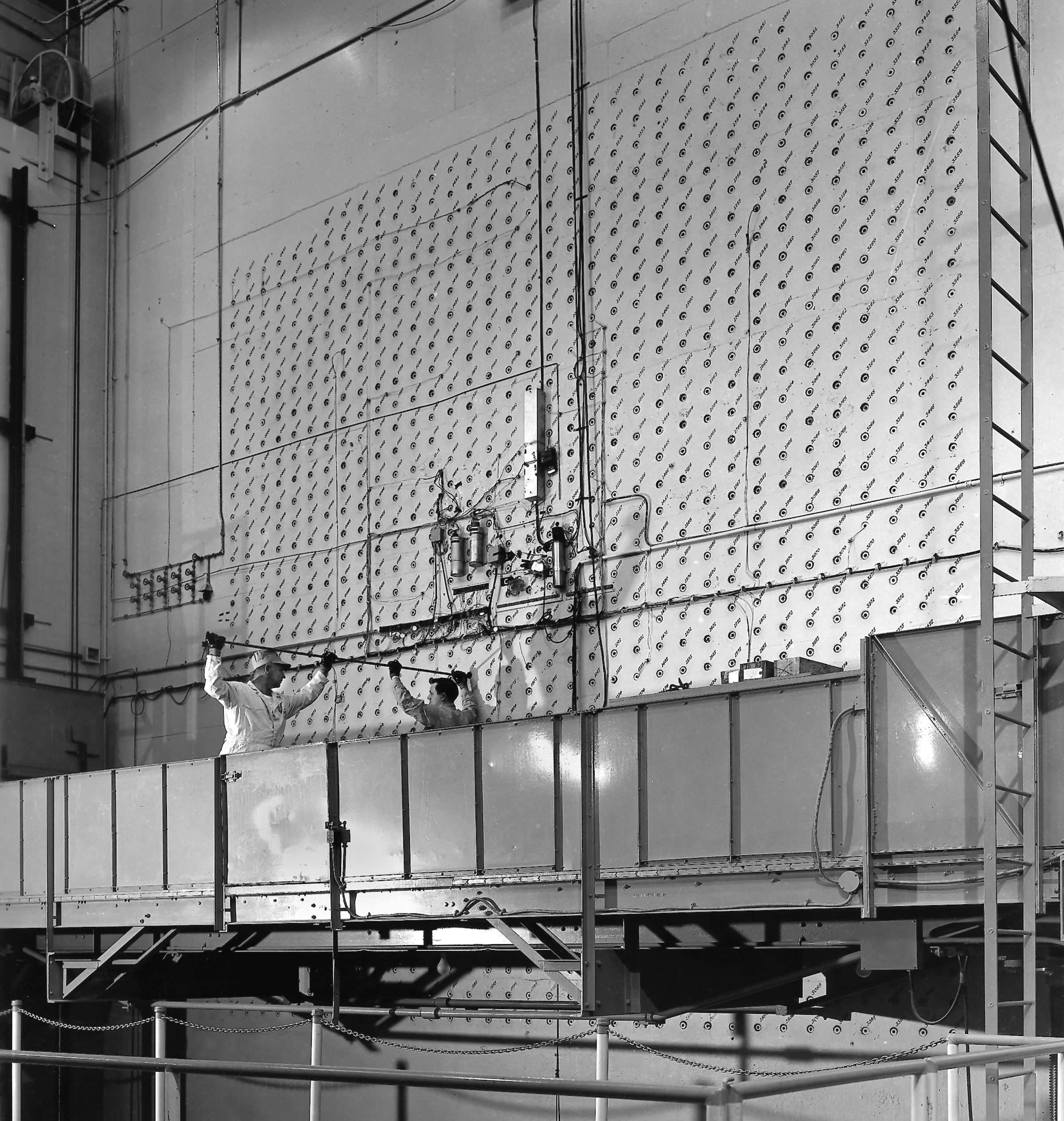
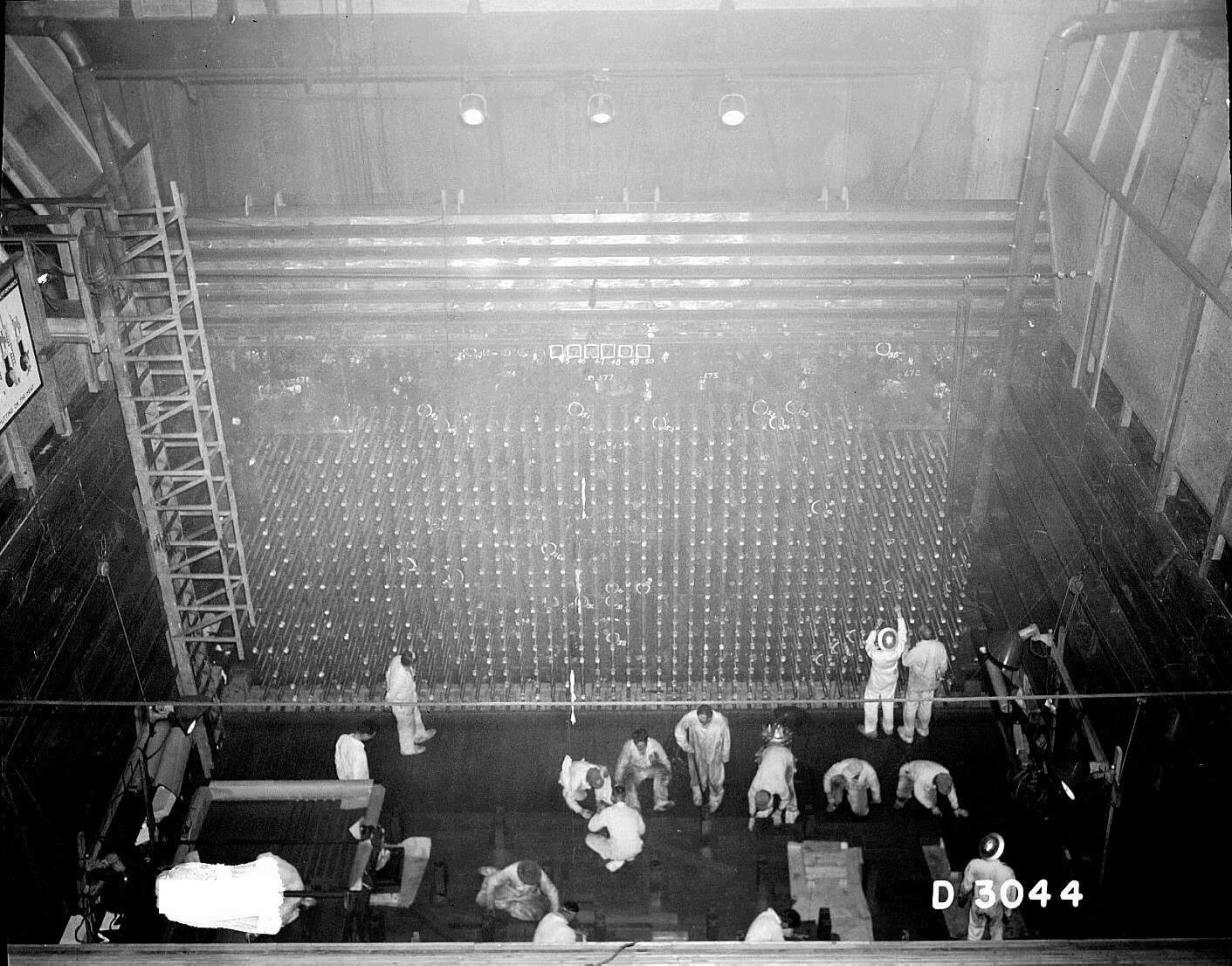
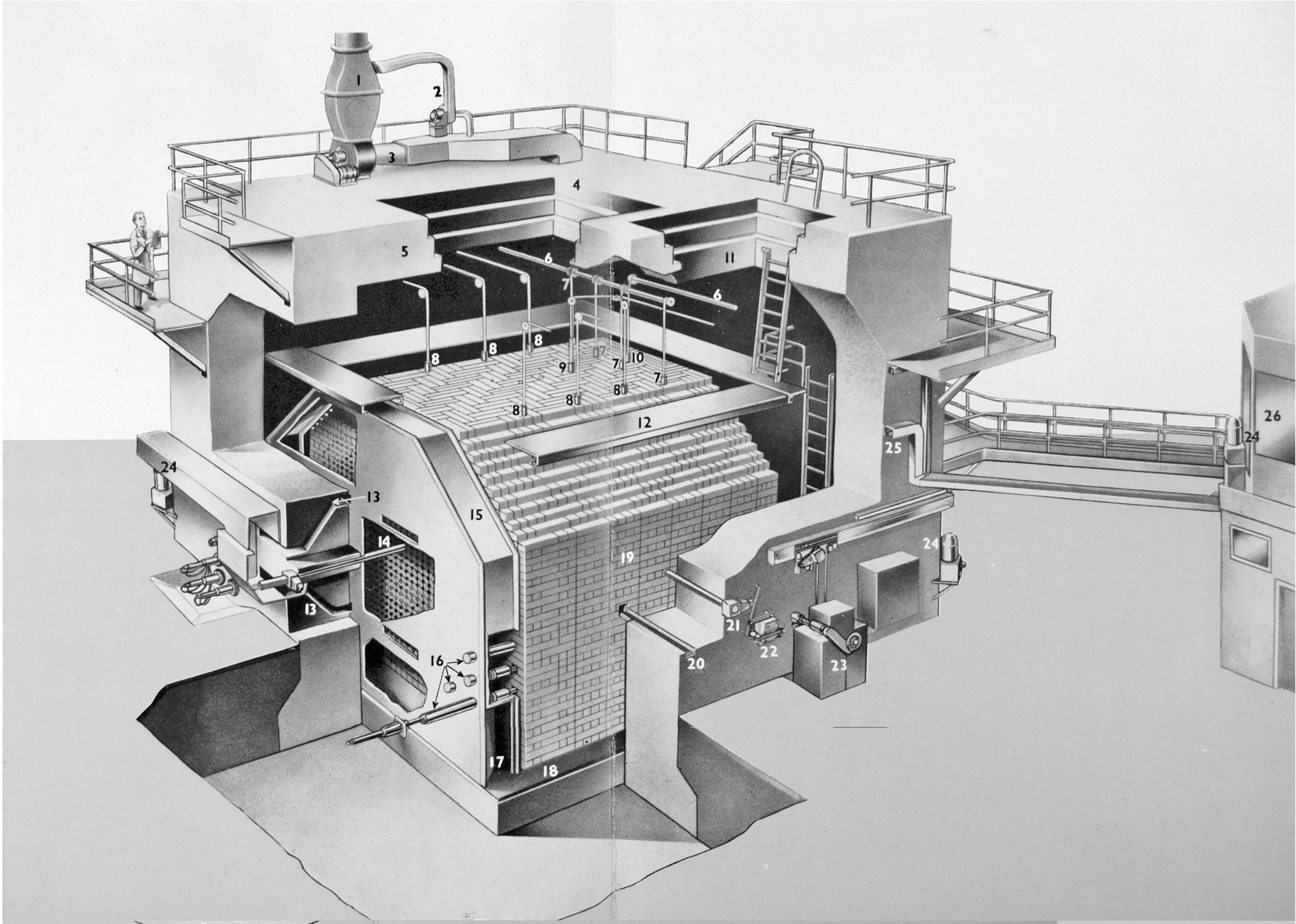
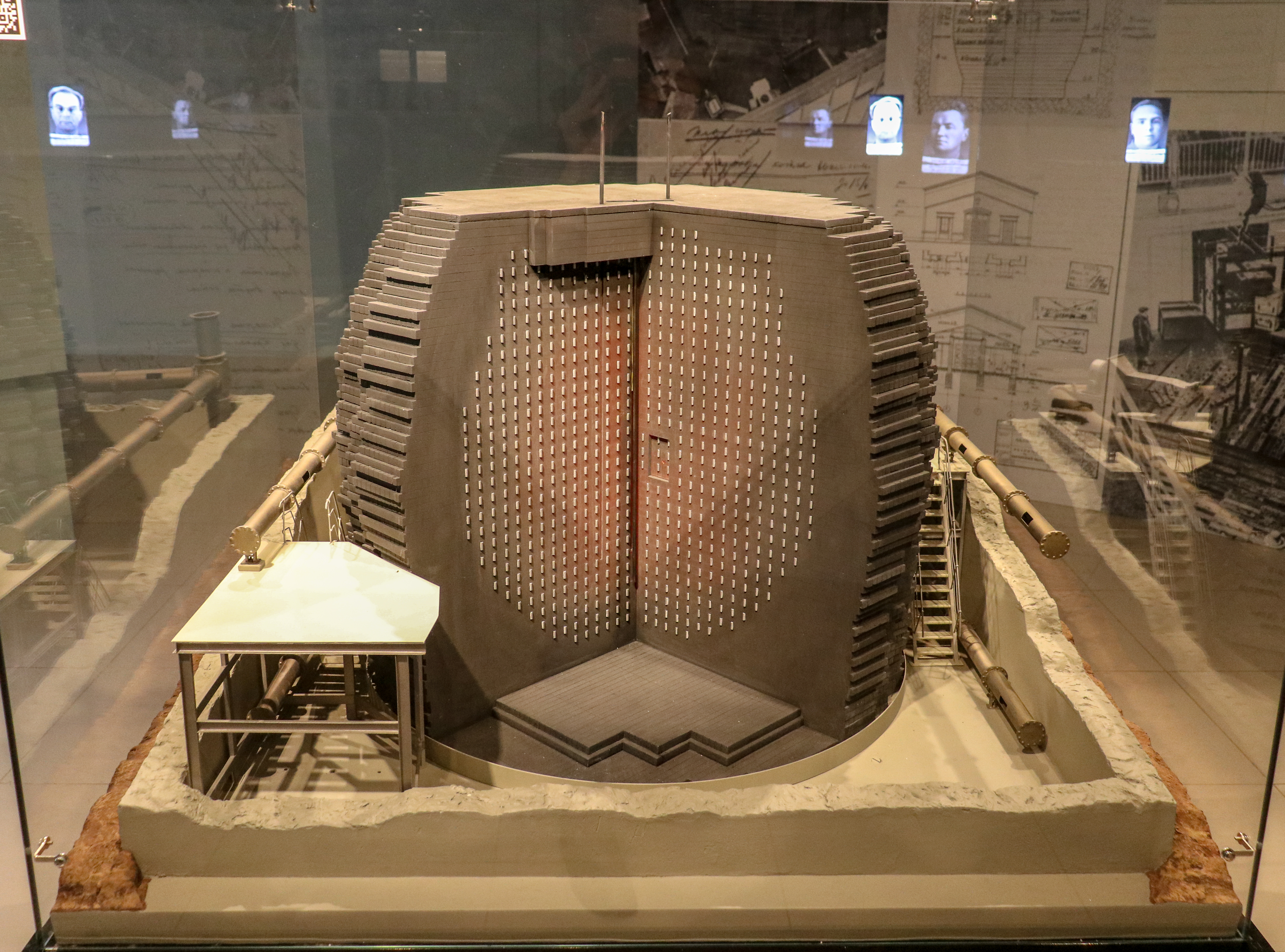
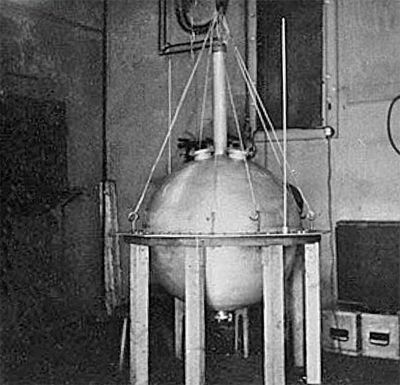
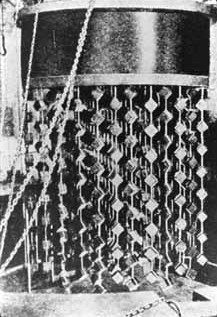
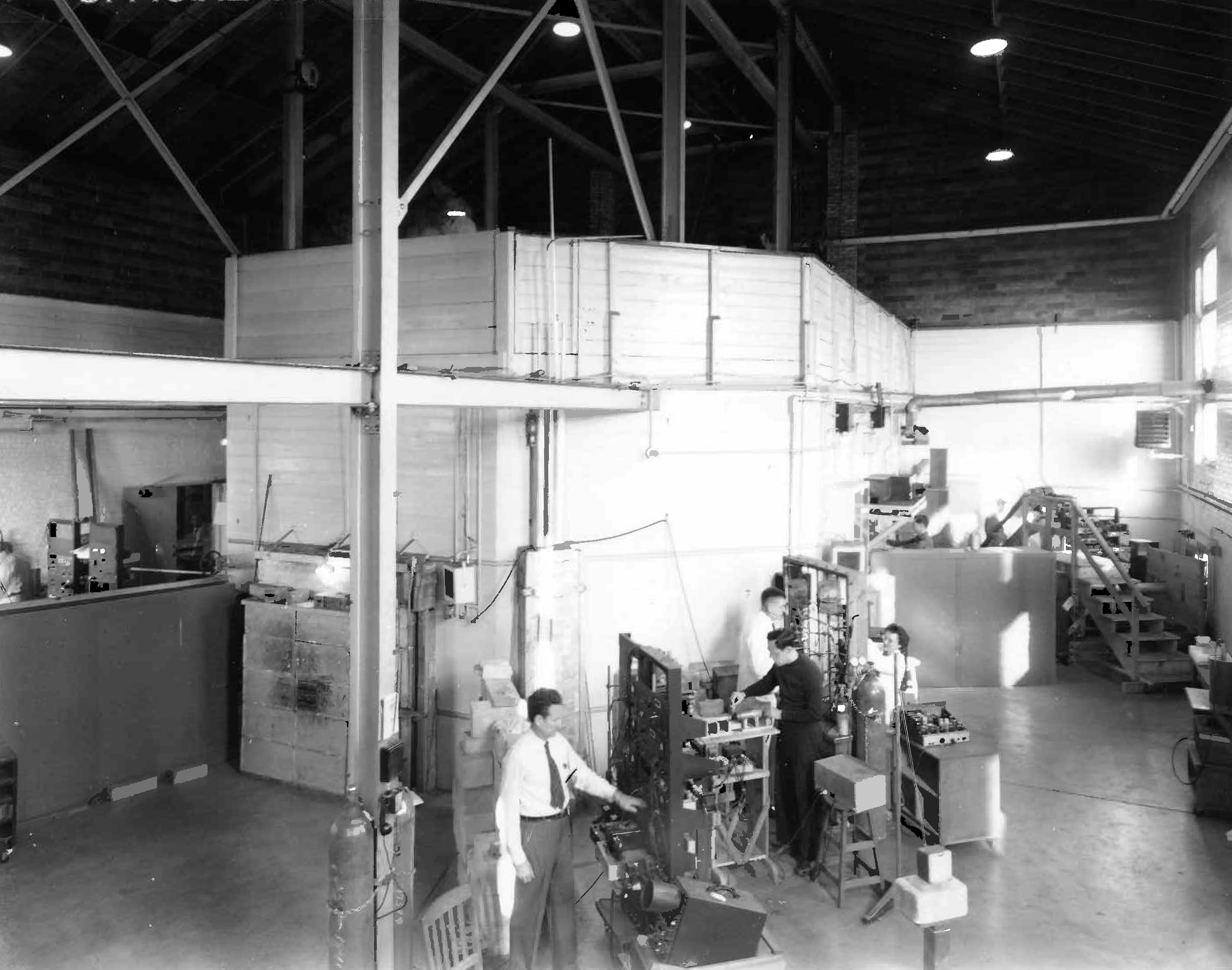
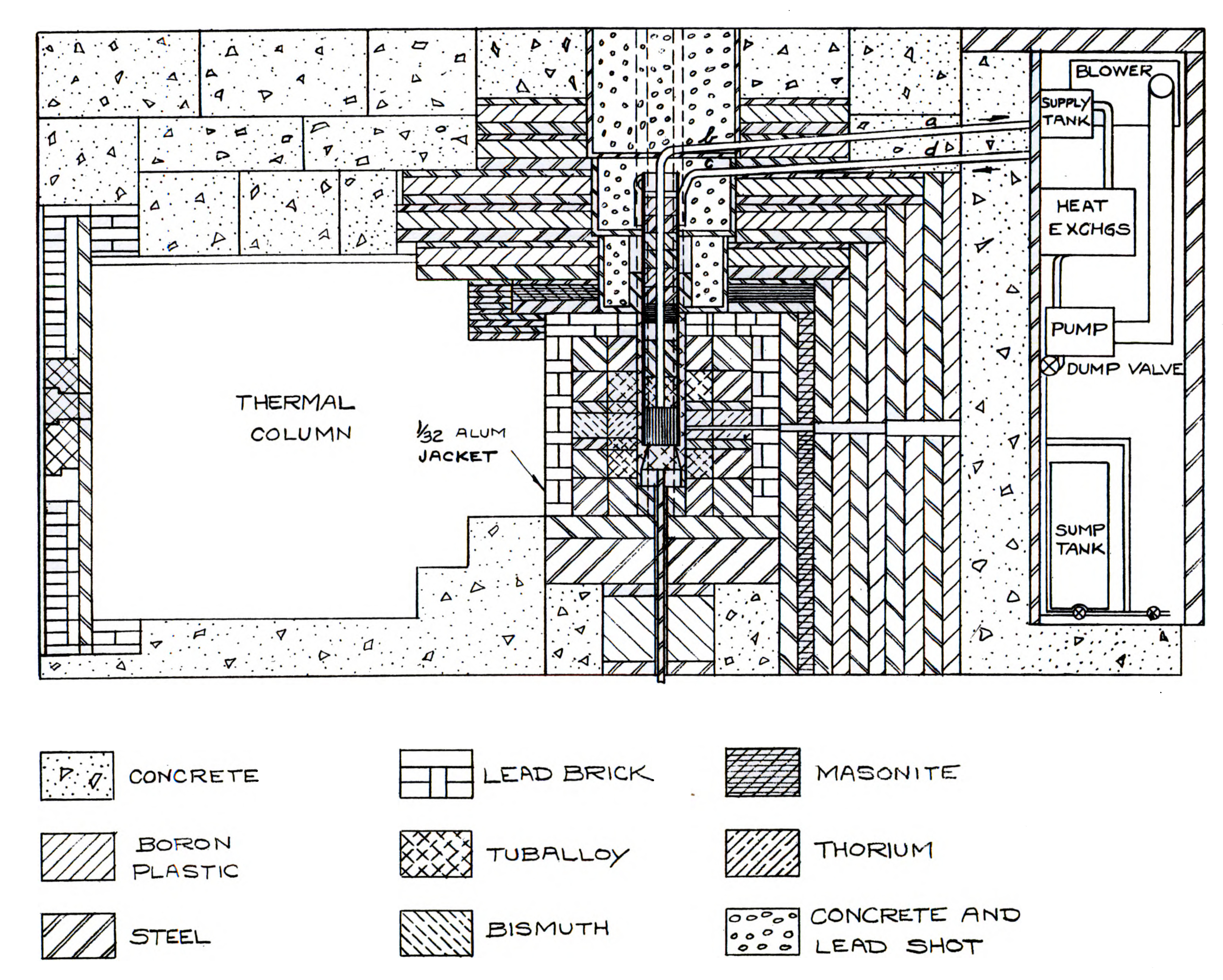
From top, left to right
1. Chicago Pile-1, first reactor
2. X-10 Graphite Reactor, second reactor
3. Hanford B reactor, first large-scale reactor
4. GLEEP, first British reactor
5. F-1, first Soviet reactor
6. Leipzig L-IV, early Nazi German pile
7. Haigerloch B-VIII, final Nazi German pile
8. Chicago Pile-3, first heavy-water reactor
9. Clementine, first fast reactor
- 1940
  - On May 27, Edwin McMillan and Philip Abelson publish the discovery of neptunium at the Berkeley Radiation Laboratory. They use the 60-inch cyclotron produce a small sample of neptunium-239 via neutron bombardment of uranium-238. They also correctly assume its beta decay to the alpha-emitting plutonium-239, but are unable to isolate it.
  - On July 1, Georgy Flyorov and Konstantin Petrzhak publish the discovery of spontaneous fission, in uranium atoms insulated from cosmic rays 60 meters underground in the Dinamo station of the Moscow Metro. They also report no such reactions in protactinium or thorium.
- 1941
  - In January, Walther Bothe and Peter Jensen conduct an neutronics experiment with a 55-cm radius graphite sphere. They erroneously conclude, possibly due to unaccounted boron and cadmium impurities of a few ppm, a neutron capture cross-section value for carbon over twice its accepted value. This hinders development of the Nazi German nuclear program.
  - On February 24, Glenn T. Seaborg, Edwin McMillan, Emilio Segrè, Joseph W. Kennedy, and Arthur Wahl make the discovery of plutonium at the Berkeley Radiation Laboratory. They identify plutonium-238 from oxidation of a sample of beta-decaying neptunium-238, produced via deuteron bombardment of uranium in the 60-inch cyclotron. A paper is submitted to Physical Review in March but publication is delayed until 1946 due to World War II.
- 1942
  - In May, the L-IV atomic pile at the University of Leipzig sees the first net neutron production of the Nazi German nuclear program. The design uses a uranium powder, a heavy water moderator and reflector, and a central radium-beryllium neutron source.
  - On June 23, uranium powder in the L-IV atomic pile ignites on contact with air, causing a steam explosion and wider fire. This is the first nuclear-related accident, and leads the German program to use only solid uranium in future designs.
  - On November 13, Alpha-I, the first calutron track, begins uranium enrichment operation at the Y-12 facility, the first electromagnetic separation plant.
  - On December 2, Chicago Pile-1, the first artificial nuclear reactor, achieves criticality at the University of Chicago. The Manhattan Project's assembly uses blocks of natural uranium and graphite as a moderator to produce 0.5 watts of thermal power.
- 1943
  - On February 28, in the early hours of the morning, a Special Operations Executive-trained team of Norwegian commandos detonate explosive charges on the heavy-water electrolysis chambers at the Vemork hydroelectric plant during Operation Gunnerside.
  - On March 20, Chicago Pile-2, the world's second reactor, achieves criticality at Site A, Illinois. It is a rebuilt and slightly enlarged version of CP-1.
  - On March 22, Igor Kurchatov, director of Laboratory No. 2 writes a letter to Mikhail Pervukhin suggesting that "eka-osmium-239" (plutonium-239) produced in a theoretical "uranium boiler" (reactor) will undergo fission as an alternative to uranium-235 in bomb designs.
  - In March, the US approves a Soviet request for over 0.3 tons of uranium compounds under the Lend-Lease program. General Leslie Groves hopes to hide the extent of the Manhattan Project, and reveal the location of Laboratory No. 2.
  - On July 31, Igor Kurchatov learns via atomic spies of the successful criticality and graphite moderator choice of Chicago Pile-1 eight months prior.
  - On November 4, the X-10 Graphite Reactor achieves criticality at Oak Ridge National Laboratory, Tennessee. It is the world's third reactor, the first built for continuous operation, the first reactor for the production of plutonium-239.
- 1944
  - On March 19, Takeuchi Masa of the Japanese nuclear weapons program's Riken laboratory constructs the country's first Clusius tube thermal diffusion design for uranium enrichment.
  - In March, the 305 Test Pile begins operation at the Hanford Site, primarily to provide quality assurance of graphite for subsequent reactors. Via atomic spies, this design would be replicated as the USSR's first F-1 reactor.
  - On May 9, LOPO (low-power), the first aqueous homogeneous reactor, the first reactor to use enriched uranium, and the first water-cooled and water-moderated reactor, achieves criticality at Los Alamos National Laboratory, using a solution of uranyl sulfate at 14.7% enrichment.
  - On May 15, Chicago Pile-3, the first heavy-water reactor, achieves criticality at Site A, Illinois. It uses deuterium oxide i.e. heavy water as a moderator instead of graphite, as well as a coolant.
  - In July, the X-10 Graphite Reactor becomes the first reactor to exceed 1 MWth power output, reading 4 MWth due to the addition of two large fans.
  - On September 16, S-50, the first and only full-scale liquid thermal diffusion plant, begins operation at Clinton Engineer Works, Tennessee.
  - On September 26, the B Reactor is started at Hanford Site, Washington. At 250 MWth, it is the first reactor to exceed 10 and 100 MWth and is considered the first large-scale reactor. The site is primarily built for weapons-grade plutonium production, but also produces weapons-usable tritium, polonium-210, and uranium-233, as well as non-military plutonium, thulium-170, and iridium-192.
  - On September 27, the first instance of xenon poisoning occurs in the Hanford B reactor. Water contamination of graphite, boron impurities in the Columbia River water coolant, and nitrogen in the air are all suggested as the neutron poisoning cause. John Archibald Wheeler and Enrico Fermi calculate the cause and the problem is solved by loading additional fuel slugs into extra tubes.
  - In December, HYPO (high-power), the second aqueous homogenous reactor, achieves criticality at Los Alamos National Laboratory, using a uranyl nitrate solution at 14.5% enrichment.
  - In December, the D Reactor is started at Hanford Site, Washington. It is largely identical to the B Reactor with the same primary purpose of weapons-grade plutonium production.
- 1945
  - On January 20, a team led by Otto Robert Frisch achieves the first criticality burst in the Dragon Critical Assembly at Los Alamos National Laboratory, the first fast neutron reactor and first prompt criticality. The device uses a uranium hydride slug and hollow cylinder both enriched at 71-75%, with the former dropped through the latter.
  - In February, the F Reactor is started at Hanford Site, Washington. It is largely identical to the B Reactor with the same primary purpose of weapons-grade plutonium production.
  - On March 12, K-25, the first gaseous diffusion plant becomes fully operational at Oak Ridge National Laboratory, Tennessee. It is the world's largest building, and had an electrical consumption almost triple that of the entire city of Detroit.
  - On March 15, 612 Boeing B-17 Flying Fortress bomb the Auergesellschaft plant of the Nazi German nuclear program, in Oranienburg. It is an attempt to deny its uranium to the advancing Soviet Army on the recommendation of General Leslie Groves. Over 100 tons are still ultimately recovered by Russian Alsos for the F-1 reactor.
  - On April 23, the Allied Alsos Mission dismantles and recovers uranium and heavy water from the B-VIII atomic pile at Haigerloch, the final pile of the Nazi German nuclear program.
  - On September 5, ZEEP, the first reactor in Canada and outside the United States, achieves criticality at Chalk River Laboratories, on the Ontario side of the Ottawa River.
- 1946
  - On November 19, Clementine, the first continuous fast neutron reactor, the first liquid metal cooled reactor, and the first reactor to use plutonium fuel achieves criticality at Los Alamos National Laboratory, using a mercury coolant abandoned by all later designs.
  - On December 25, F-1, the first reactor in the Soviet Union and in Europe, and outside North America, achieves criticality at the Kurchatov Institute in Moscow. It is fuelled with uranium recovered by "Russian Alsos" from the Nazi German nuclear program including the Auergesellschaft Oranienburg plant.
- 1947
  - On July 22, NRX, the second reactor in Canada, achieves criticality at Chalk River Laboratories.
  - On August 15, GLEEP, the first reactor in the United Kingdom, achieves criticality at the Atomic Energy Research Establishment in Oxfordshire.
- 1948
  - On June 10, Reactor A, the second reactor and the first plutonium production reactor in the Soviet Union, achieves criticality at Mayak Production Association, Chelyabinsk Oblast.
  - In August, the X-10 Graphite Reactor becomes the first reactor to generate electricity. The experiment uses a steam generator and engine to power a single flashlight bulb. This could be considered the first boiling water reactor.
  - On December 15, Zoé aka EL-1, the first reactor in France, and the first heavy water reactor in Europe, begins experimental operation at Fort de Châtillon.
- 1949
  - On February 1, Georgy Flyorov uses the Physical Boiler on Fast Neutrons, the first Soviet pulsed fast reactor, at Design Bureau 11, Sarov, to measure the critical mass of plutonium, ahead of the RDS-1 test.
  - In April, TVR, the third reactor and first heavy water reactor in the Soviet Union, achieves criticality.

== 1950s ==
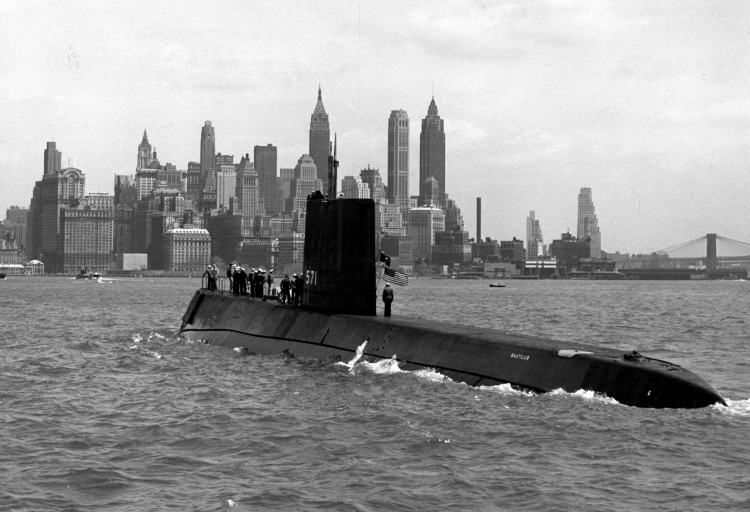
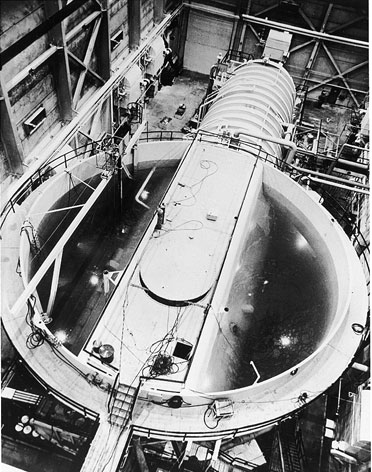
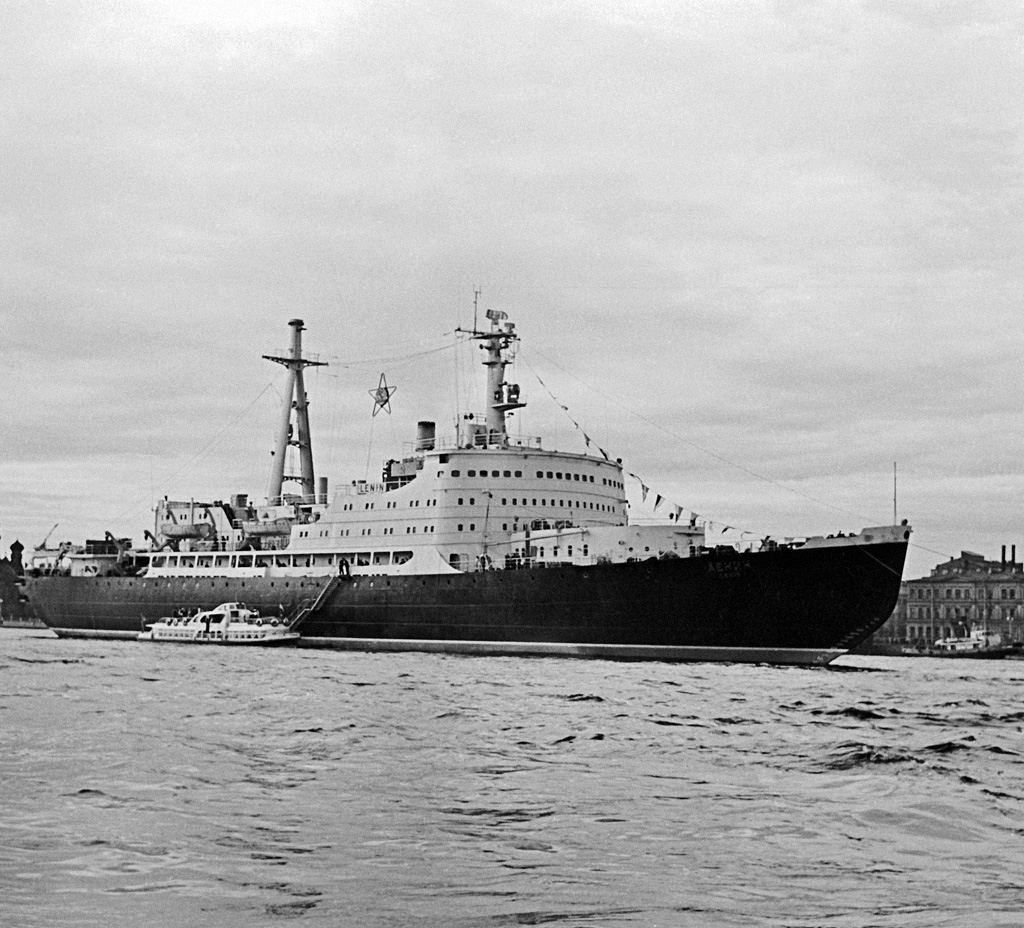
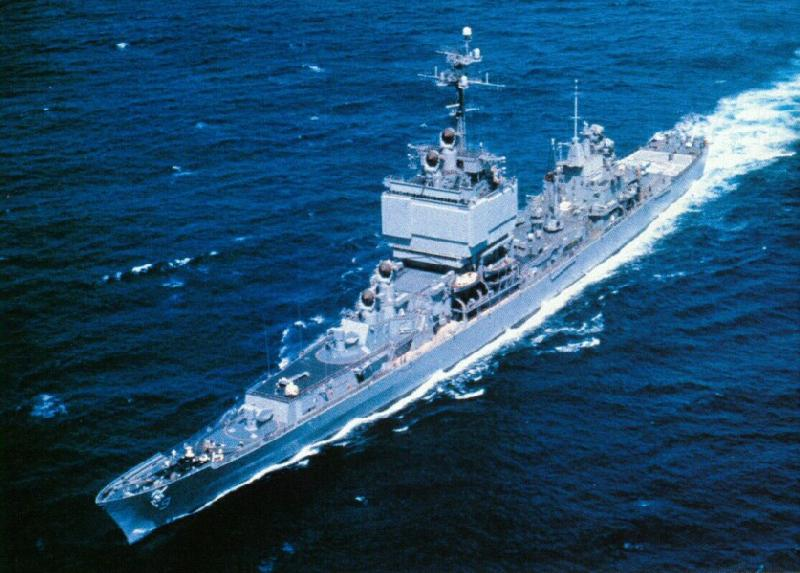
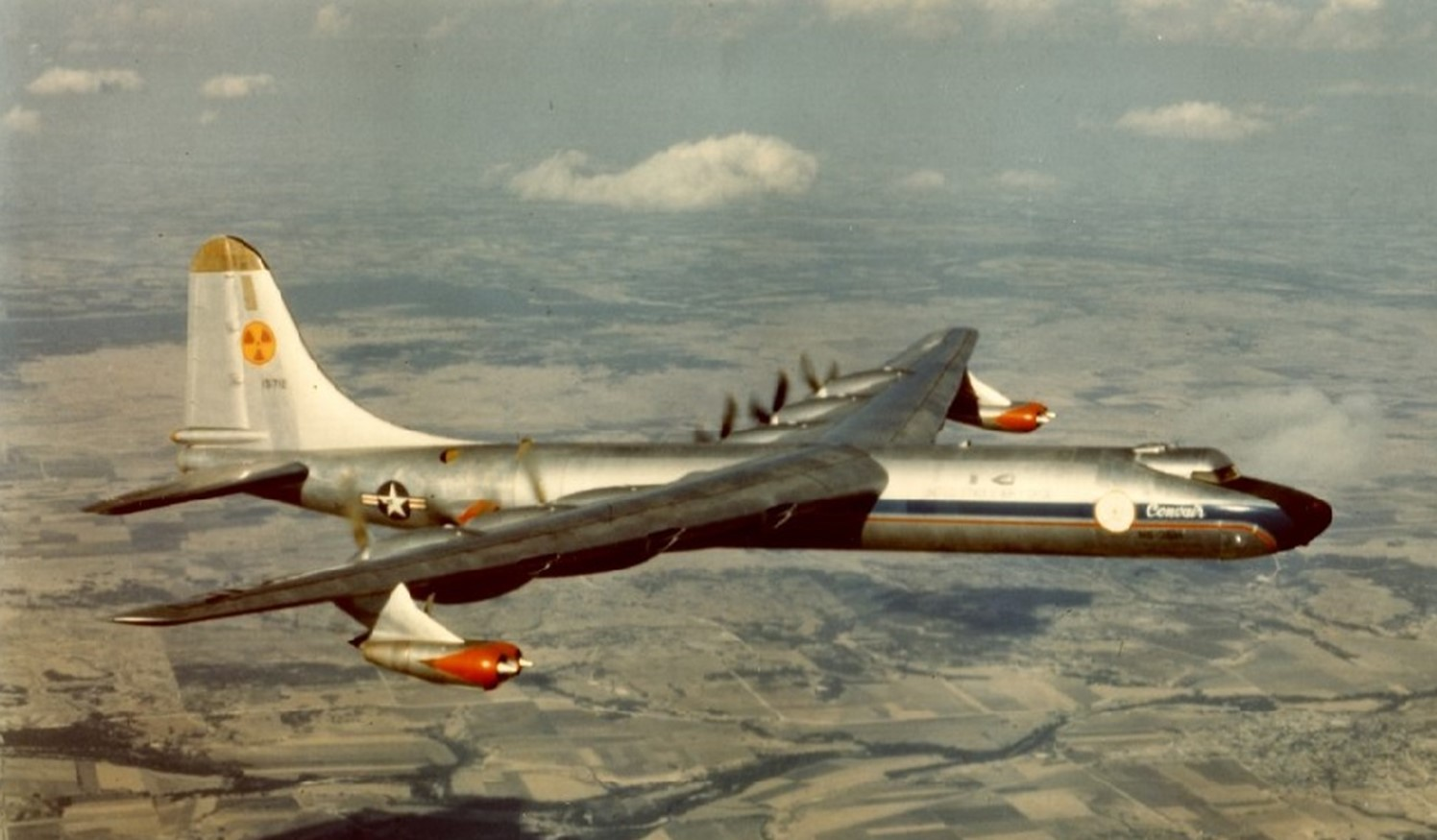
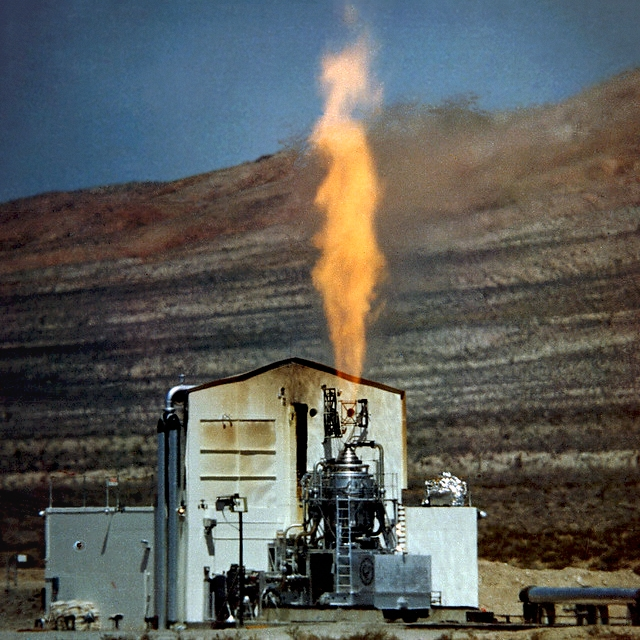
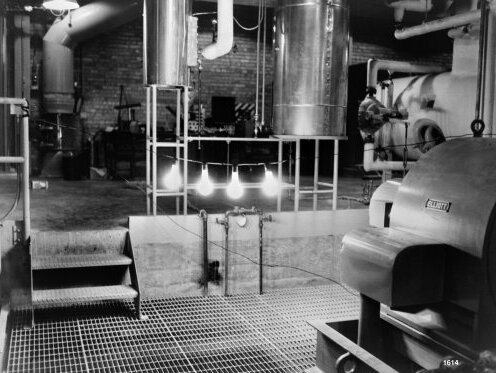
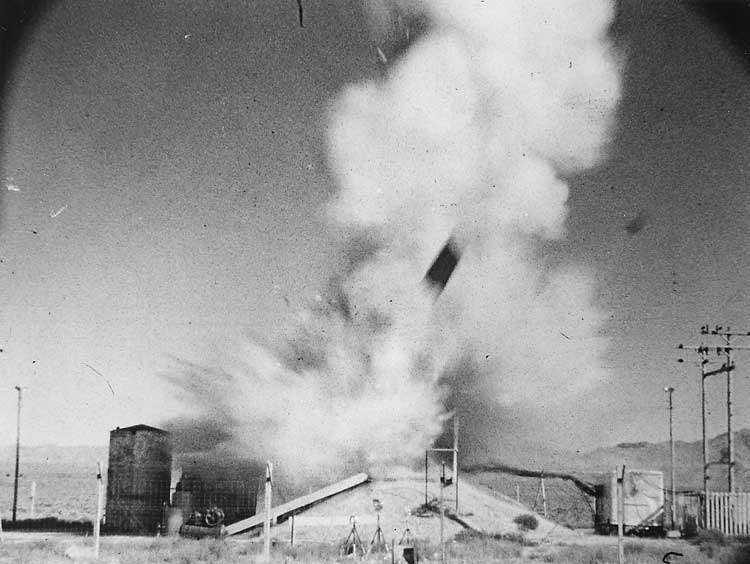
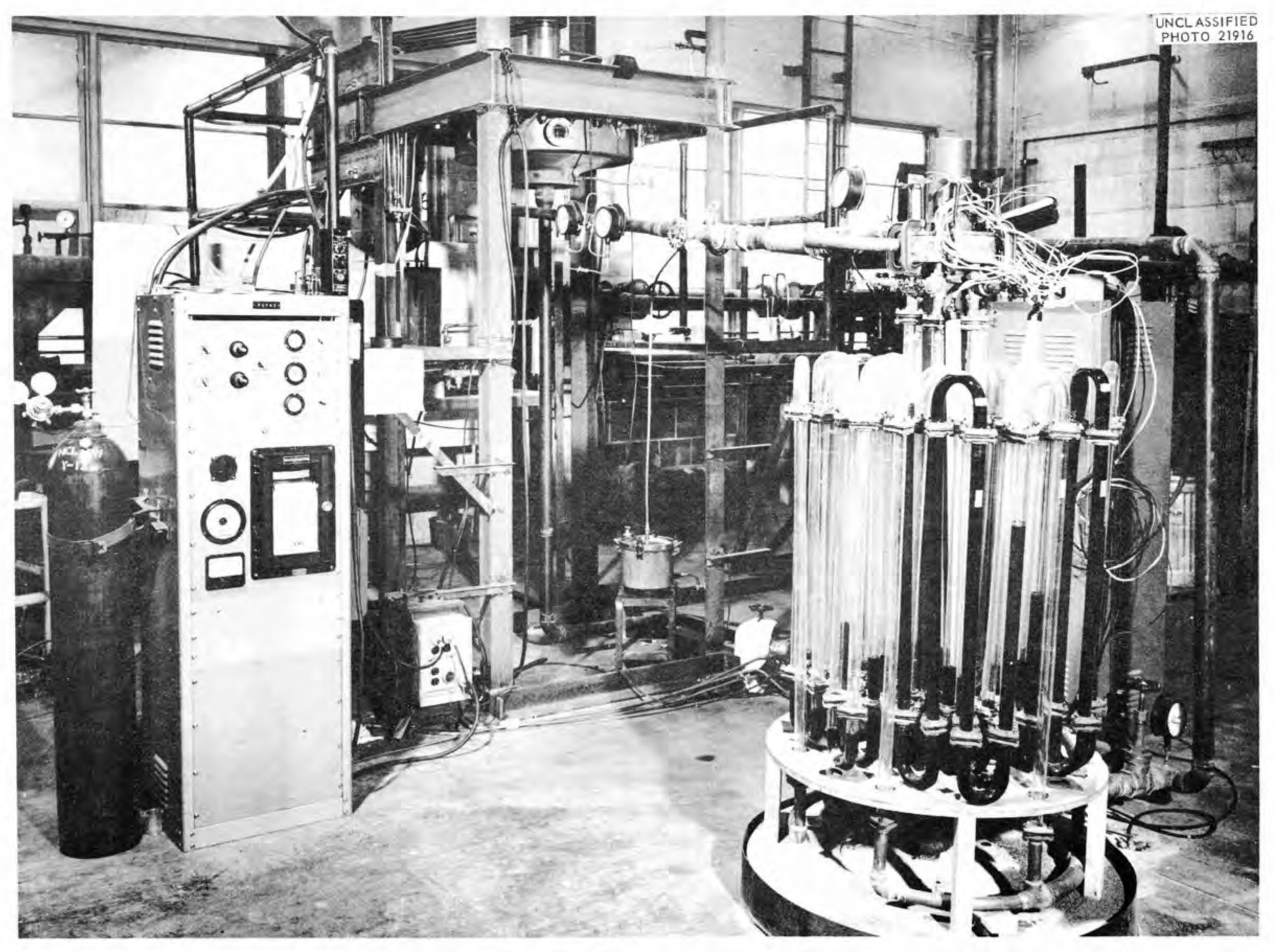
From top, left to right
1. USS Nautilus, first nuclear vessel
2. S1W, first pressurized water reactor
3. Lenin, first nuclear surface ship
4. USS Long Beach, first nuclear surface combat ship
5. Convair NB-36H, first aircraft to operate a reactor
6. Kiwi A, first nuclear thermal rocket
7. EBR-I, first breeder reactor
8. BORAX-I, first boiling water reactor
9. Aircraft Reactor Experiment, first molten-salt reactor
- 1951
  - On August 24, EBR-I, the first breeder reactor, producing more fuel than it consumes, begins power operation.
- 1952
  - On October 27, EL-2, the first gas-cooled reactor, achieves criticality at the Saclay Nuclear Research Centre, France. While many early reactors were air-cooled, it is an experimental 2 MW design testing the first closed circuit nitrogen and carbon dioxide cooling.
  - On December 2, NRX, Canada's second reactor, constructed at Chalk River Laboratories, experiences the first core meltdown in a nuclear facility. Future president Jimmy Carter is among the US Navy crew sent to assist clean-up.
  - The AI reactor (Industrial Association Mayak) begins production of tritium at the Mayak plant in Ozyorsk, USSR.
- 1953
  - On March 30, the S1W, the first pressurized water reactor, achieves criticality at Idaho National Laboratory. It is designed to power submarines
  - On December 8, US president Dwight D. Eisenhower delivers the Atoms for Peace speech to the United Nations General Assembly in New York City. It promotes education resources and empowers companies such as American Machine and Foundry to supply research reactors to Mexico, Colombia, Brazil, Peru, Chile, Argentina, Portugal, Israel, Iran, Pakistan, Thailand, South Korea, Japan, the Philippines, Indonesia, and Yugoslavia.
  - On December 28, the R reactor, the first production reactor at Savannah River Site, is started. It uses natural uranium and a heavy water moderator, and is intended to produce both plutonium and tritium for weapons.
  - BORAX-I, the first full-scale boiling water reactor, achieves criticality at Argonne National Laboratory.
- 1954
  - On January 21, the USS Nautilus, the first vessel to use nuclear propulsion and the first nuclear submarine, powered by the S2W reactor is launched from General Dynamics Electric Boat shipyard, Groton, Connecticut, and in 1958 completes the first journey under the North Pole.
  - On June 27, AM-1 becomes the first grid-connected reactor at Obninsk Nuclear Power Plant, southwest of Moscow. It is a predecessor to the RBMK design.
  - On November 3, the Aircraft Reactor Experiment, the first molten-salt reactor, achieves criticality at Oak Ridge National Laboratory.
- 1955
  - On July 17, BORAX-III becomes the first reactor to fully power a town, during a demonstration in Arco, Idaho.
  - On September 17, the Aircraft Shield Test Reactor, the first reactor operated during aircraft flight, begins test flights in the Convair NB-36H.
- 1956
  - On August 4, Apsara, the first reactor in India and in Asia, achieves criticality at Bhabha Atomic Research Centre, in Trombay, Mumbai.
  - On December 3, BORAX-IV, the first reactor to use thorium fuel, achieves criticality at Argonne National Laboratory.
- 1957
  - On October 31, FRM I, the first reactor in West Germany, achieves criticality at Technical University of Munich.
  - On November 2, the first gas centrifuge enrichment plant begins operation, in Leningrad, under a team led by Evgeni Kamenev.
  - On December 5, the Lenin, the first nuclear-powered surface vessel, a Soviet icebreaker, is launched from the Admiralty Shipyards in Leningrad.
  - The OMRE, the first complete organic nuclear reactor, cooled and moderated by hydrocarbons, in this case terphenyls, achieves criticality at the Idaho National Laboratory.
- 1958
  - On September 27, HWRR, a Soviet-supplied 7 MW heavy water research reactor, the first reactor in China, begins operation in Beijing. Nuclear power is developed primarily for weapons production until the Qinshan I reactor begins development in 1985.
- 1959
  - On June 16, TRICO-I, the first reactor in the Belgian Congo and in Africa, achieves criticality at Lovanium University, Kinshasa.
  - On July 1, Kiwi A, the first nuclear thermal rocket, begins testing at Area 25, Nevada, under Los Alamos Scientific Laboratory's Project Rover. It produces 70 MW for five minutes and achieves a core temperature of 2,900 K, using liquid hydrogen as the coolant, moderator, and propellant.
  - On July 14, the USS Long Beach, the first nuclear-powered surface combat ship, is launched from Fore River Shipyard, Massachusetts.

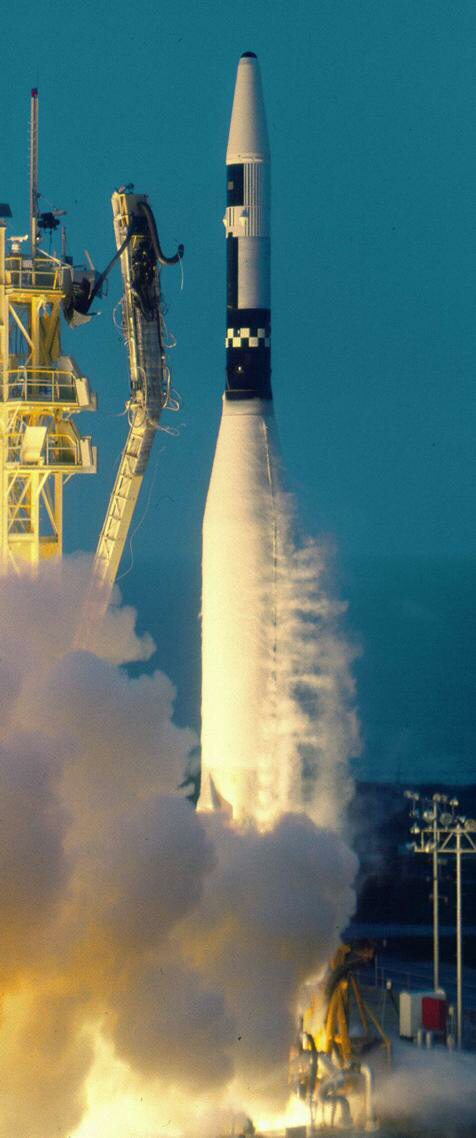
The 1965 launch of the Snapshot satellite carrying the SNAP-10A reactor, the first operated in space and to power a nuclear electric propulsion system.

== 1960s ==
- 1960
  - In June, IRR-1, a HEU-fueled research reactor, the first reactor in Israel, achieves criticality at the Soreq Nuclear Research Center near Yavne. It is under US inspection.
  - On September 24, the USS Enterprise, the first nuclear-powered aircraft carrier, is launched from Newport News Shipbuilding, Virginia.
- 1961
  - On January 3, the Army Nuclear Power Program's SL-1 experiences a prompt critical accident, killing three workers, the first and only fatal nuclear power accident in the United States.
  - On November 11, UTR-KINKI, the first reactor in Japan, achieves criticality at Kinki University.
- 1962
  - On March 3, PM-3A, the first and only reactor to operate in Antarctica, achieves criticality at McMurdo Station.
  - In March, KRR-1, the first reactor in South Korea, achieves criticality at Korea Atomic Energy Research Institute.
  - On September 16, Indian Point Unit 1, the first commercial reactor to use thorium fuel, begins commercial operation in New York.
- 1963
  - On December 26, IRR-2, a plutonium production reactor, the second reactor in Israel, achieves criticality at Shimon Peres Negev Nuclear Research Center near Dimona. It is a heavy water-moderated design sold by France and not under IAEA monitoring.
  - In December, the N reactor, the ninth at the Hanford Site, Washington, begins operation. At 4000 MWth it is one of the largest plutonium production reactors ever. Additionally, until the DR reactor's shutdown in December 1964, the Hanford Site operates at 25,870 MWth, the largest nuclear plant ever by thermal power.
- 1964
  - In August, the Dragon reactor, the first helium-cooled reactor, achieves criticality under UKAEA operation at Winfrith, England.
  - The AMB-100, the first reactor to use supercritical water, begins operation at Beloyarsk Nuclear Power Station in the Soviet Union. Alongside the AMB-200 they are the only two such reactors ever, but the design has re-emerged as a Generation IV reactor concept.
- 1965
  - On April 3, NASA launches into orbit the Snapshot satellite carrying SNAP-10A, the first reactor operated in space and via its cesium ion thruster also the first use of nuclear electric propulsion. It uses a uranium zirconium hydride fuel-moderator hybrid, and a liquid sodium–potassium alloy (NaK) coolant.
  - A Soviet-supplied IR-2000 pool-type research reactor begins operation as the first reactor in North Korea, at the Nyongbyon Nuclear Scientific Research Center.
- 1966
  - On August 28, the AVR, the first pebble-bed reactor, achieves criticality at Julich Research Center, West Germany. It was an early pioneer of helium-cooled high temperature designs.
  - On November 8, Alexander Vinogradov and colleagues at the USSR Academy of Sciences publishes the detection by Luna 10's gamma ray spectrometer of radiation from uranium, thorium, and potassium on the Moon's surface.
- 1967
  - On January 24, MH-1A, the first floating nuclear power plant, achieves criticality. It was developed by the Army Nuclear Power Program at Gunston Cove, Virginia.
- 1968
  - On June 8, the Phoebus-2A nuclear thermal rocket engine undergoes its second test and first at full power. It achieves a maximum power output of 4082 MWth.
  - On October 2, the Molten-Salt Reactor Experiment achieves criticality as the first uranium-233 reactor, at Oak Ridge National Laboratory, Tennessee.
- 1969
  - On March 28, the Ultra-High Temperature Reactor Experiment achieves criticality at Los Alamos National Laboratory. Unlike other HTGRs, the helium coolant directly contacts the fuel and removes fission products, allowing outlet temperatures up to 1300 °C.

== 1970s ==
- 1973
  - On June 11, Alexander Vinogradov and colleagues at the USSR Academy of Sciences publishes the detection by Venera 8's gamma ray spectrometer of radiation from uranium, thorium, and potassium on Venus' surface.
- 1975
  - In July, Kraftwerk Union AG begins work on the Bushehr Nuclear Power Plant in Iran. It is the first commercial nuclear project in the Middle East. Work is paused following the 1979 Iranian revolution and completed in collaboration with Russia in 2011.
- 1976
  - On October 28, US president Gerald Ford indefinitely suspends nuclear spent fuel reprocessing, and encourages other nations to do the same. The decision is based on the plutonium proliferation risk, especially the 1974 first Indian nuclear weapons test, Smiling Buddha.
- 1978
  - On November 5, voters in Austria reject a referendum to allow the startup of its first nuclear power plant, Zwentendorf, by 50.47% to 49.53%. A subsequent law makes Austria the first country to ban nuclear power.
- 1979
  - On March 28, Three Mile Island Nuclear Generating Station's Unit 2 reactor experiences a partial core meltdown, in Pennsylvania, US. It is the worst nuclear accident in US history based on radioactive material released. It is classed as a Level 5 nuclear accident out of seven on the International Nuclear Event Scale.

== 1980s ==
- 1981
  - On June 7, the Israeli Air Force carries out Operation Opera, bombing an unfinished secret Iraqi nuclear reactor. Ten Iraqi soldiers and one French civilian engineer were killed. France sold Iraq the Osiris-class research reactor which claimed it was for peaceful use.
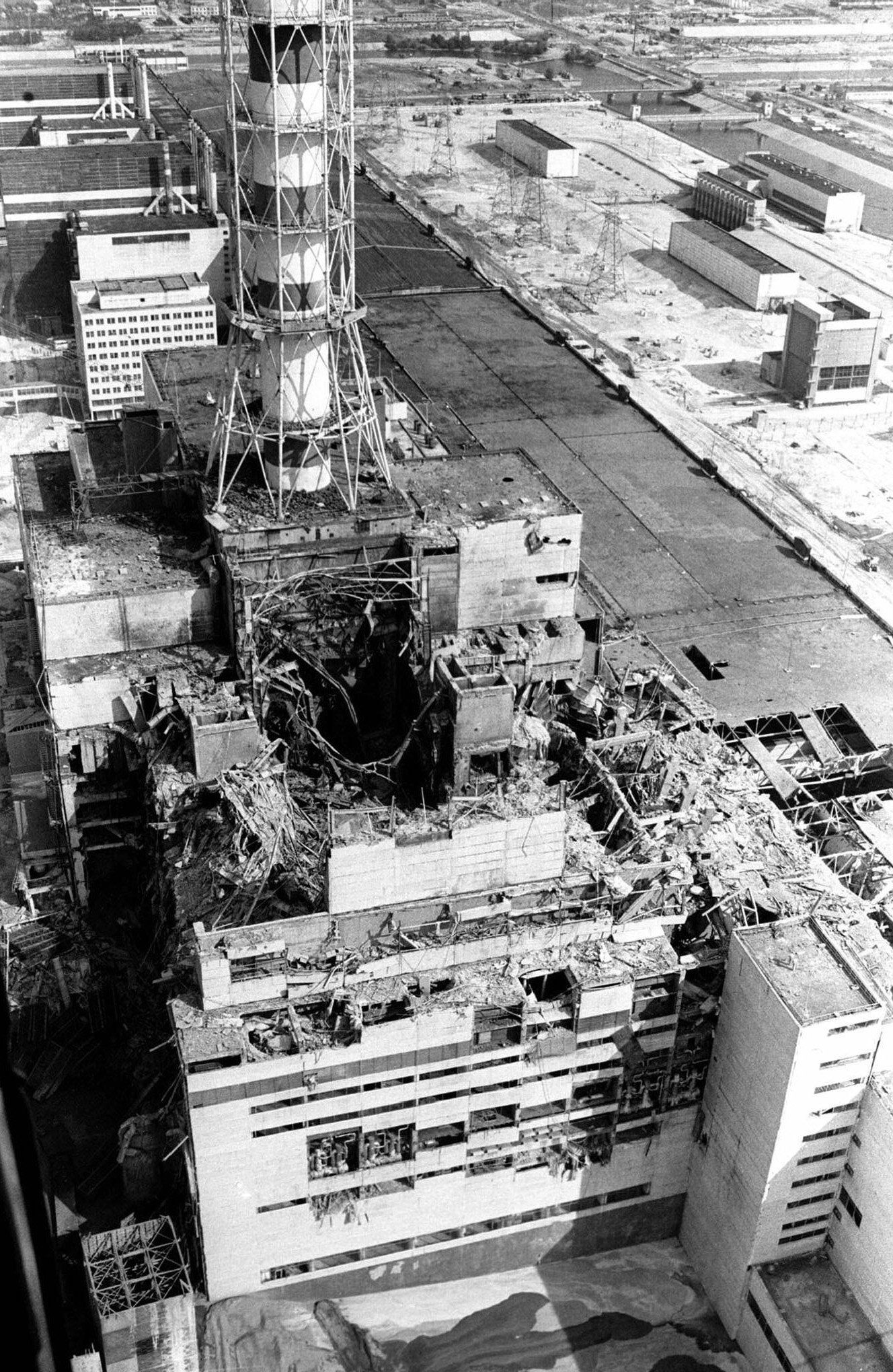
    The damaged Reactor 4 following the 1986 Chernobyl disaster, the worst nuclear accident in history.
- 1983
  - On December 31, Unit 1 at Ignalina Nuclear Power Plant comes online in the Lithuanian SSR. The first RBMK-1500 unit, at 4800 MWth, it is the largest nuclear reactor unit by thermal power ever. Alongside Unit 2 they are the only RBMK-1500 units completed. During testing the "positive scram" power excursion flaw in the RBMK design during graphite moderator-tipped control rod insertion is discovered. Other RBMK plants are alerted but changes are not made to prevent it triggering the 1986 Chernobyl disaster.
- 1985
  - In September, Superphénix, the largest fast reactor and breeder reactor ever, at 1,242 MWe, achieves criticality at Creys-Malville in France.
- 1986
  - On April 26, in the Ukrainian SSR, Chernobyl Nuclear Power Plant Unit 4 experiences a core meltdown during a test, the first Level 7 nuclear accident on the International Nuclear Event Scale. It destroys its containment building and spreads radioactive material across Europe.
- 1987
  - On January 7, the N reactor, the last US plutonium production reactor, is shut down at the Hanford Site, Washington. Modifications are begun to improve safety due to the water-cooled graphite-moderated design being shared by Chernobyl Unit 4, but the plant never reopens.

== 1990s ==
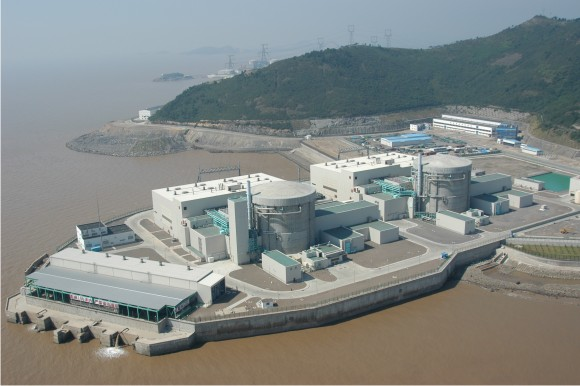
- The Qinshan Nuclear Power Plant in Zhejiang, China, operational from 1991.
  1991
  - On December 15, Qinshan I, the first commercial reactor in China, is connected to the grid.
- 1993
  - On February 18, the United States and Russia sign the Megatons to Megawatts Program agreement. Russia agrees to dilute 500 metric tons of its excess weapons-grade highly enriched uranium to low-enriched uranium, using US-supplied natural uranium, for sale on the global market, over the course of 20 years. The deal is signed by William J. Burns and Viktor Mikhaylov in Washington D.C.
- 1994
  - On October 21, the United States and North Korea sign the Agreed Framework. The DPRK agrees to freeze its operational 5 MWe and under construction 50 MWe and 200 MWe Magnox-style reactors at Nyongbyon and Taechon, seen as a plutonium production risk. The US assures the construction of two 1000 MWe light water reactors, likely OPR-1000s, by the formation of the Korean Peninsula Energy Development Organization (KEDO). KEDO's director later comments the agreement is "a political orphan within two weeks of its signature" as the Republican Revolution ends Congressional funding for the organization.
- 1995
  - On January 8, Russia's Minatom and Iran's Atomic Energy Organization sign an agreement to complete the Bushehr Nuclear Power Plant with two VVER-1000 PWR units.
- 1997
  - On July 2, Unit 7 begins commercial operation at Kashiwazaki-Kariwa Nuclear Power Plant, Japan, making it the largest nuclear power plant ever by net electrical power at 7,965 MWe.

== 2000s ==
- 2000
  - On December 21, the HTR-10 prototype high-temperature helium-cooled pebble-bed reactor achieves criticality at Tsinghua University, China.
- 2001
  - On June 26, the United States Department of Energy classifies the SILEX process of uranium laser enrichment, originally developed by the Australian company Silex Systems.
- 2007
  - On September 6, the Israeli Air Force carries out Operation Outside the Box, bombing an unfinished secret Syrian nuclear reactor in Deir ez-Zor Governorate. Allegedly 10 North Korean scientists are killed, and Syria initially considers a chemical weapons response. Iran reportedly provided $1 billion in funding to North Korea for its construction, which is the same gas-cooled graphite-moderated design as the Nyongbyon reactor and intended it as a backup to their enrichment facilities. The IAEA confirms the reactor in 2011 and Israel confirms the attack in 2018.

== 2010s ==
- 2011
  - On March 11, during electrical outage from the Tōhoku earthquake and tsunami, Fukushima Daiichi reactor units 1, 2, and 3 experience partial core meltdowns, and release radioactive material into the environment. It is the second Level 7 nuclear accident on the International Nuclear Event Scale, making it the worst accident since Chernobyl, and influences divestment from nuclear power in Germany, Italy, Belgium, Spain, and Switzerland.
  - On September 3, Bushehr Nuclear Power Plant in Iran, the first commercial nuclear reactor in the Middle East, begins supplying grid electricity.
- 2013
  - On May 22, the Australian company Silex Systems, working with a consortium of General Electric, Hitachi, and Cameco, completes the first demonstration of a laser enrichment facility at a test loop in Wilmington, North Carolina.
  - On October 11, the Dongfang Electric generator stator of the Taishan 1 EPR is installed in Guangdong, China. At 1750 MWe it is said to be the largest single-piece electrical generator in the world.
  - In December, the 20-year Megatons to Megawatts Program successfully concludes with the final Russian delivery of low-enriched uranium to the US. Critics later say that it led to Rosatom's dominance over the global enriched uranium market.
- 2016
  - On
- 2017
  - In November, Russia completes the first test of the 9M730 Burevestnik, the first nuclear-powered cruise missile and the first nuclear-powered aircraft of any kind.
- 2018
  - In December, the Taishan 1 EPR begins operation in Guangdong, China. At 1660 MWe it is the largest nuclear reactor unit by electrical power ever.
- 2019
  - On August 8, a Russian explosion and radiation accident kills five military and civilian specialists off the coast of Nyonoksa, on the White Sea floor. Russia claimed the accident was related to an "isotope power source for a liquid-fuelled rocket engine". A US delegate tells the United Nations General Assembly First Committee that a nuclear reaction occurred. CNBC and Reuters report it occurred during recovery of a previously tested 9M730 Burevestnik nuclear-powered cruise missile left on the seabed to cool the fission core's decay heat.
  - On December 8, the US NRC grants a 20-year extension to Turkey Point Nuclear Generating Station Units 3 and 4, the first US reactors licensed for an 80-year lifetime.
  - On December 19, Akademik Lomonosov, the first commercial floating nuclear power plant, begins operation in Chukotka, Russia.

== 2020s ==
- 2022
  - On February 24, during their invasion of Ukraine, Russian Armed Forces capture the Chernobyl exclusion zone including the power plant.
  - On March 4, Russian Armed Forces capture Zaporizhzhia Nuclear Power Plant and thermal plant, the first military attack and capture of operational commercial nuclear reactors. The largest nuclear plant in Europe, it previously provided 23% of Ukraine's electricity. Rosatom claims control while the plant continues to be operated by Ukrainian Energoatom staff under Russian orders. The six reactors are placed in various levels of shutdown.
  - On April 1, Russian Armed Forces withdraw from the Chernobyl exclusion zone. Armed Forces of Ukraine re-enter two days later.
  - On September 11, Unit 6 at Zaporizhzhia Nuclear Power Plant, the last operating reactor, is disconnected from the grid.

== See also ==
- History of nuclear power
- History of nuclear fusion
- Timeline of nuclear fusion
- Timeline of nuclear weapons development
- Lists of nuclear reactors
- Lists of nuclear disasters and radioactive incidents
