= 305 Test Pile =

- Reactor concept: Materials testing reactor
- Designed by: Manhattan Project
- Operational: 1944 to 1972
- Status: Shut down
- Location: Hanford Site

Main parameters of the reactor core
- Fuel (fissile material): Natural uranium
- Fuel state: Solid (rods)
- Neutron energy spectrum: Slow
- Primary control method: Lead cadmium ontrol rods
- Primary moderator: Nuclear graphite (bricks)
- Primary coolant: Air

Reactor usage
- Primary use: Materials testing
- Power (thermal): 50 W
- Criticality (date): March 1944
- Operator/owner: Hanford Engineer Works

The 305 Test Pile was the first reactor built at the Hanford Site during the Manhattan Project. It achieved criticality in March 1944, becoming the world's fourth nuclear reactor. It tested the purity of the nuclear graphite and refined uranium used for all subsequent plutonium production reactors at the site during the Cold War, including the B Reactor and N Reactor.

== History ==
The 305 Test Pile was the fourth reactor in the world to achieve criticality, in March 1944, following the Manhattan Project's construction of Chicago Pile-1, Chicago Pile-2, and the X-10 Graphite Reactor. Like these, it was also natural uranium-fuelled, graphite-moderated. It was the world's first materials testing reactor. Specifically, it was used in quality assurance of graphite rods and uranium slugs, which would be used for Hanford's plutonium production reactors, had a sufficiently low concentration of neutron poison impurities, such as boron and cadmium. Like the Chicago Piles, at a very low power level just above criticality, usually around 50 watts.

In 1946, the reactor tested the neutronic properties of "myrnalloy", a Manhattan Project codename for thorium. In the early 1960s, it tested lithium-6-enriched targets for tritium production in the N Reactor.

Historians agree that an unknown component of the Soviet atomic spies program passed the reactor's design to the Soviet atomic bomb project, which chose to essentially duplicate it in the form of their first nuclear reactor, F-1, critical in December 1946.

== See also ==
- F-1 (nuclear reactor), a near-duplication of the pile
- Hanford Site
