= GLEEP =

British experimental nuclear reactor

GLEEP, which stood for Graphite Low Energy Experimental Pile, was a long-lived experimental nuclear reactor in Oxfordshire, England. Reaching criticality for the first time on 15 August 1947, it was the first reactor to operate in western Europe, and the second in Eurasia, beat only by the F-1 in the USSR.

In an effort led by John Cockcroft, GLEEP was built at the Atomic Energy Research Establishment, a former Royal Air Force airfield, near Harwell in Oxfordshire (then in Berkshire), in an aircraft hangar. It was a graphite moderated, air-cooled reactor and used 11,500 natural uranium fuel aluminium-clad rods inserted into 676 horizontal fuel channels. Radiation shielding was provided by 5 feet of baryte concrete. Designed for a power output of 100 kilowatts, for the first 1.5 years of its life GLEEP was run at 80 kW for the production of radioisotopes, until this activity was taken over by the BEPO reactor, after which time it was operated at 3 kW. GLEEP was also used for investigations into reactor design and operation, primarily the qualification of graphite and uranium, and the determination of cross sections of various materials, among other purposes. Later on, its primary use shifted to the calibration of instruments for measuring neutron flux.

It had an exceptionally long life for a reactor of 43 years, being shut down in 1990. The fuel was removed in 1994 and the control rods and external equipment the following year. A project to completely dismantle it was started in 2003 and completed in October 2004.

== See also ==
- List of nuclear reactors
