= F-1 (nuclear reactor) =

Nuclear research reactor in Moscow, Russia

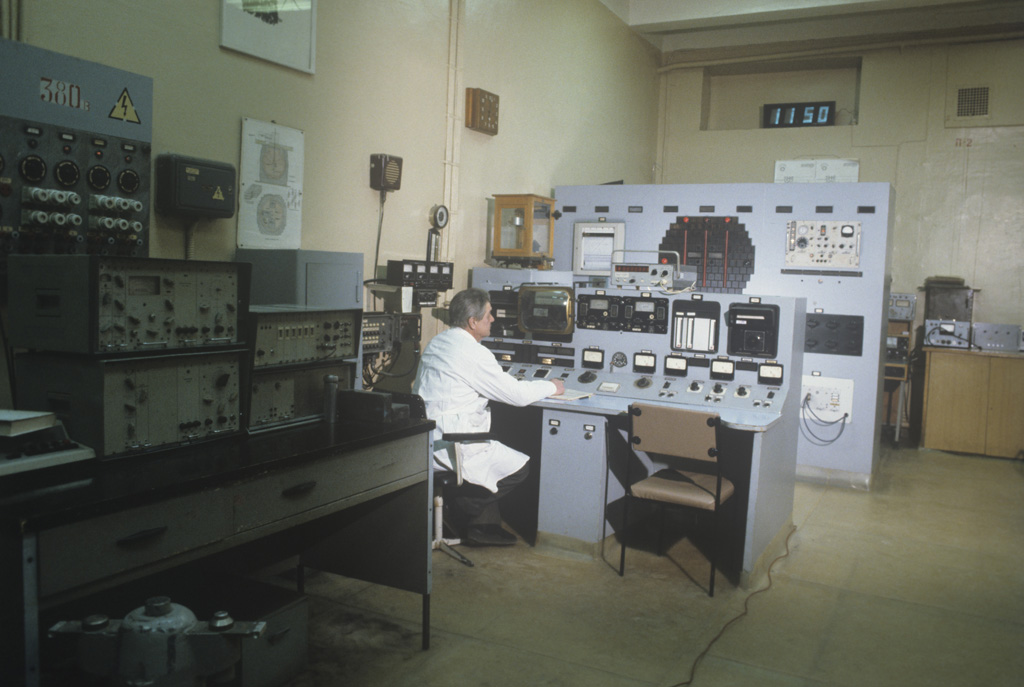
- Control panel of the reactor
- Official name: Physics-1
- Country: Soviet Union, now Russian Federation
- Location: Moscow
- Coordinates: 55°47′46″N 37°28′43″E
- Status: Permanent Shutdown
- Construction began: 15 November 1946; 79 years ago
- Commission date: 26 December 1946; 79 years ago
- Owners: Russian Research Centre, Kurchatov Institute
- Operators: Russian Research Centre, Kurchatov Institute

Nuclear power station
- Reactor type: Graphite Pile
- Reactor supplier: Russia

Thermal power station
- Primary fuel: 46,411 kg (102,319 lb) of natural uranium metal
- Tertiary fuel: 41 kg (90 lb) of 2% enriched uranium

Power generation
- Capacity factor: 24 kW

External links
- Commons: Related media on Commons

The F-1 (Ф-1, from Russian: первый физический реактор, pervyy fizicheskiy reaktor, 'first physical reactor', CIA: Fursov Pile) is a research reactor operated by the Kurchatov Institute in Moscow, Russia. When started on December 25, 1946, it became the first nuclear reactor in Europe to achieve a self-sustaining nuclear chain reaction.

It was still in operation in the beginning of the 2010s, with a power level of 24 kW, making it, at that time, the world's oldest operating reactor. The fuel in F-1 is metallic uranium with the natural content of the 235 U isotope (0.72%), graphite as a moderator, and cadmium rods to control the neutron flux. The spherical structure with a diameter of about 6 meters is made of loose graphite bricks. The graphite stack has holes in which fuel and control rods are placed, as well as research and control equipment. The weight of graphite is 400 tons, uranium is 50 tons.

Thermal power of the reactor is from 100 W to 1 MW. Air cooling, if necessary, was provided by fans. Long-term operation at high power was not possible, but the large mass of the core allowed a short-term increase in power to peak values. In November 2016 it was in permanent shutdown state.

Historians agree that an unknown component of the Soviet atomic spies program passed the design of the 305 Test Pile, the Manhattan Project's fourth nuclear reactor, to the Soviet atomic bomb project, which chose to essentially duplicate it.

== See also ==
- Chicago Pile-1 - first US reactor
- GLEEP - first British reactor
- Zoé - first French reactor
