= Piqua Nuclear Power Facility =

Nuclear reactor in Ohio, United States

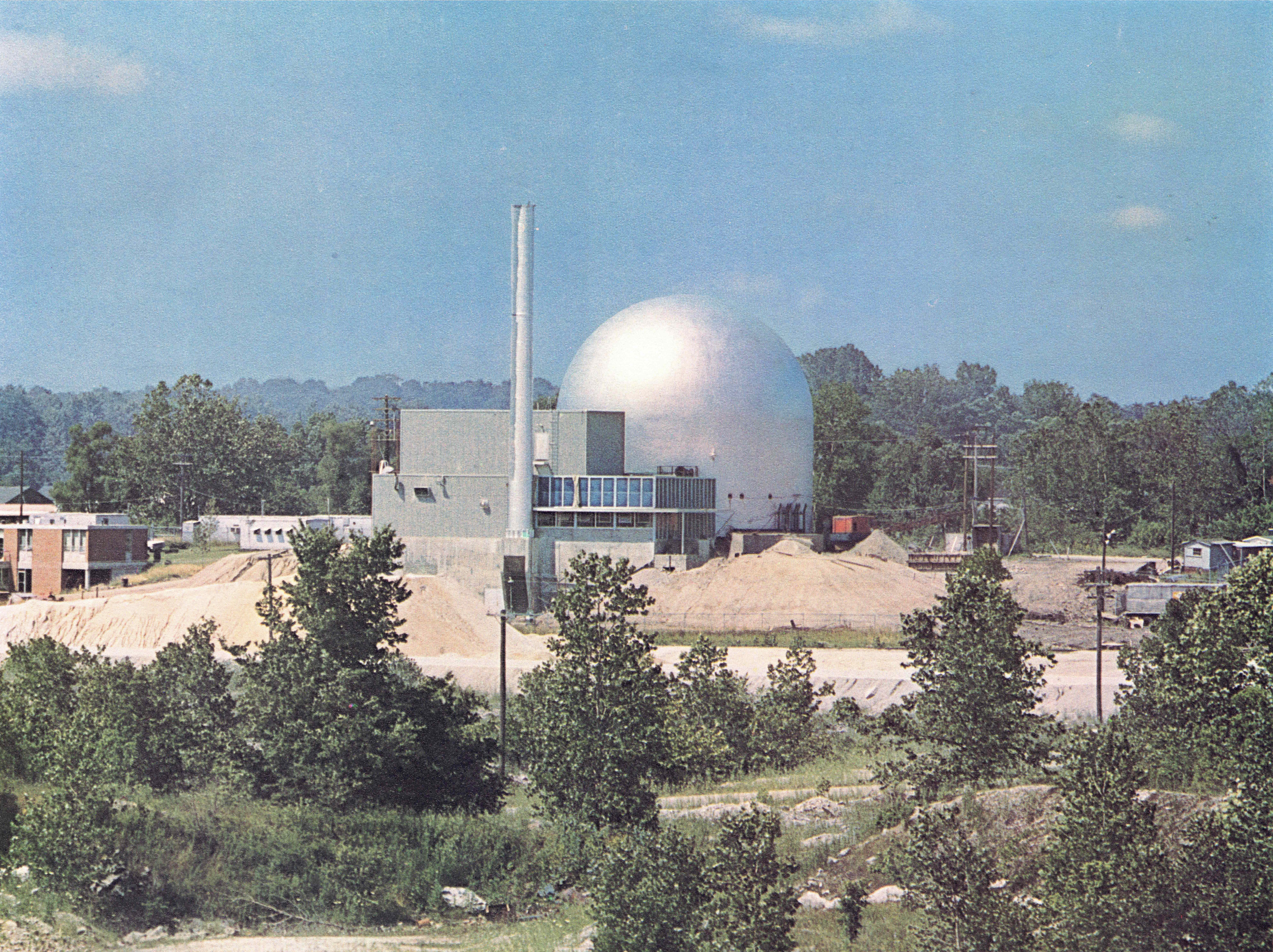
- The Piqua reactor when it was operational.
- Country: United States
- Location: Springcreek Township, Miami County, near Piqua, Ohio
- Coordinates: 40°07′56.34″N 84°14′05.16″W
- Status: Decommissioned
- Commission date: 1963
- Decommission date: 1966

External links
- Commons: Related media on Commons

The Piqua Nuclear Power Facility was an organic-cooled and moderated nuclear reactor which operated just outside the southern city limits of Piqua, Ohio in the United States. The plant contained a 45.5-megawatt (thermal) organically cooled and moderated nuclear reactor (terphenyl, a biphenyl-like oil). The Piqua facility was built and operated between 1963 and 1966 as a demonstration project by the Atomic Energy Commission. The facility ceased operation in 1966. It was dismantled between 1967 and 1969, and the radioactive coolant and most other radioactive materials were removed. The remaining radioactive structural components of the reactor were entombed in the reactor vessel under sand and concrete.

== Background ==
The plant was first proposed February 1, 1956, when the local public utility company in Piqua, Ohio proposed to build a 12,500 kilowatt nuclear power plant using an organically moderated reactor by asking to join the U.S. government's small reactor construction program which provided joint government-utility participation. It was in response to the second round of the Atomic Energy Commission's (AEC) Power Reactor Demonstration Program. The six other municipalities who applied were revealed when Senator Clinton P. Anderson of New Mexico accused the AEC of trying to impose an 'absolute Iron Curtain around thought,' regarding nuclear secrecy.

By September 27, 1956, the AEC authorized contract negotiations for the $8 million plant. $4 million would come from the AEC to finance the reactor construction and $4 million would be from the city of Piqua for facilities, land and building. The Atomics International division of North American Aviation was selected to design the plant. Their experience building and operating the Organic Moderated Reactor Experiment uniquely qualified them for the job.

== Plant operating events ==
As the plant was only in operation for three years, a summary of key operating events is included

| Date | Action |
|---|---|
| June 1963 | First criticality achieved. |
| July 1963 | Fuel loading completed. |
| January 27, 1964 | Full power achieved; reactor operated steadily but with one scram. |
| May 21, 1964 | First scheduled shutdown for routine maintenance and inspection. During this period of operation, POMR contributed ~ 40% of the energy generated by the City of Piqua. |
| December 7, 1964 | Reactor was shut down to renew fifteen in-vessel filters and remove the fuel element in Core position F-13 for examination. |
| January 28, 1965 | Reactor was shut down for complete replacement of in-vessel filters, maintenance, and for relocation of the instrumented fuel element from position E-12 to position D-5. |
| April 2, 1965 | Several malfunctioning control rod drive units repaired. Concern over possible plugged condition of the inner process tube of the control rod-bearing elements led to the movement of the six inner ring control rod elements to peripheral positions. The core size was increased from 61- 67 fuel elements. |
| May 6 – 12, 1965 | Scram occurred on May 6, 1965. During this time, the reactor coolant level had been lowered by operational error, which resulted in a temporary loss of circulation through three elements. Shutdown was extended until May 12 so the three fuel elements could be removed to spent-fuel storage. |
| May 13, 1965 (est) | Immediately upon restart, excessive surface temperatures were noted, necessitating additional fuel element removal. Because of the fuel element removal, the system operated with only one coolant pump during the latter half of June and into July. |
| July 18, 1965 | Reactor shut down for modifications, maintenance, and in-vessel filter replacement; performed extensive modifications of the in-core control rod circuitry. |
| September 6, 1965 | Reactor operation resumed. |
| October 12, 1965 | Reactor shut down, fuel rearrangements were made, increasing the core loading to 70 fuel elements. |
| October 23, 1965 | Reactor restarted. Operation of the reactor continued at an average power level of about 24 MWt. |
| January 13, 1966 | Reactor scrammed because of a spurious signal. At this time, there was no indication of any unusual condition in the reactor core. Prior to restarting the reactor, an abnormal in-core condition was identified during the performance of a rod-drop test. |

== Technical problems ==
In 1966, problems with control rods and fouling in cooling surfaces led to the cessation of operations. The neutron flux within the reactor core induced polymerization of terphenyl, leading to increased viscosity of the coolant and fouling.

== Plant decommissioning ==
Cross-section of the decommissioned reactor building.

After the plant ceased operations in 1966, Atomics International was performing work that would allow the plant to restart operations. However, the AEC decided to terminate the operating contract, citing higher-priority needs for manpower and funding, lack of programmatic interest, and technical problems. The site's buildings were decontaminated, except for the containment vessel, which remained entombed in concrete.

Ongoing environmental inspections and dose reconstruction projects have been undertaken by the CDC and other entities.

== Site today ==
The facility's buildings that were not entombed are now used as a warehouse and office space for the City of Piqua. The US Department of Energy has proposed removal of the dome. The City of Piqua is currently demolishing the remaining facility structures.

== See also ==
- WR-1
- Terphenyl
- Santa Susana Field Laboratory
