= WR-1 =

Retired Canadian nuclear research reactor

The Whiteshell Reactor No. 1, or WR-1, was a Canadian research reactor located at AECL's Whiteshell Laboratories (WNRL) in Manitoba. Originally known as Organic-Cooled Deuterium-Reactor Experiment (OCDRE), it was built to test the concept of a CANDU-type reactor that replaced the heavy water coolant with an oil substance. This had a number of potential advantages in terms of cost and efficiency.

The 60 MWth reactor was designed and built by Canadian General Electric for a cost of $14.5 million CAD. The construction started 1 November 1962. It achieved criticality on 1 November 1965 and full power in December 1965. An effort to commercialize the design began in 1971 but ended in 1973 when the heavy water cooled units became the standard. From then on WR-1 operated at reduced power limits for irradiation experiments and heating the WNRE site.

WR-1 was shut down for the last time on 17 May 1985, was defuelled, and as of 2013 is undergoing decommissioning scheduled to be completed in 2023.

== Design ==
=== Basic fission ===
Natural uranium consists of a mix of isotopes, mostly ^{238}U and a much smaller amount of ^{235}U. Both of these isotopes can undergo fission when struck by a neutron of sufficient energy, and as part of this process, they will give off medium-energy neutrons. However, only ^{235}U can undergo fission when struck by neutrons from other uranium atoms, allowing it to maintain a chain reaction. ^{238}U is insensitive to these neutrons and it thus not fissile like ^{235}U. While ^{235}U is sensitive to these neutrons, the reaction rate is greatly improved if the neutrons are slowed from their original relativistic speeds to much lower energies, the so-called thermal neutron velocities.

In a mass of pure natural uranium, the number and energy of the neutrons being released through natural decay are too low to cause appreciable fission events in the few ^{235}U atoms present. In order to increase the rate of neutron capture to the point where a chain reaction can occur, known as criticality, the system has to be modified. In most cases, the fuel mass is separated into a large number of smaller fuel pellets and then surrounded by some form of neutron moderator that will slow the neutrons, thereby increasing the chance that the neutrons will cause fission in ^{235}U in other pellets. Often the simplest moderator to use is normal water; when a neutron collides with a water molecule it transfers some of its energy to it, increasing the temperature of the water and slowing the neutron.

The main problem with using normal water as a moderator is that it also absorbs some of the neutrons. The neutron balance in the natural isotopic mix is so close that even a small number being absorbed in this fashion means there are too few to maintain criticality. In most reactor designs this is addressed by slightly increasing the amount of ^{235}U relative to ^{238}U, a process known as enrichment. The resulting fuel typically contains between 3 and 5% ^{235}U, up from the natural value of just under 1%. The leftover material, now containing almost no ^{235}U and consisting of almost pure ^{238}U, is known as depleted uranium.

=== Conventional CANDU ===
The CANDU design addresses the moderation problem by replacing the normal water with heavy water. Heavy water already has an extra neutron, so the chance that a fission neutron will be absorbed during moderation is largely eliminated. Additionally, it is subject to other reactions that further increase the number of neutrons released during operation. The neutron economy is improved to the point where even unenriched natural uranium will maintain criticality, which greatly reduces the complexity and cost of fueling the reactor, and also allows it to use a number of alternative fuel cycles that mix in even less reactive elements. The downside to this approach is that the ^{235}U atoms in the fuel are spread out through a larger fuel mass, which makes the reactor core larger for any given power level. This can lead to higher capital costs for building the reactor core.

To address the cost issue, CANDU uses a unique reactor core layout. Conventional reactor designs consist of a large metal cylinder containing the fuel and moderating water, which is run under high pressure in order to increase the boiling point of the water so that it removes heat more efficiently. At the time CANDU was being designed, Canada lacked the facilities to make such large pressure vessels, especially ones large enough to run on natural uranium. The solution was to enclose the pressurized heavy water within smaller tubes and then insert these into a much larger low-pressure vessel known as the calandria. One major advantage of this layout is that the fuel can be removed from the individual tubes which allow the design to be refuelled while operating, while conventional designs require the entire reactor core to be shut down. A small disadvantage is that tubes absorb some neutrons as well, but not nearly enough to offset the improved neutron economy of the heavy water design.

=== Organic coolant ===
A significant problem with using any sort of water as a coolant is that the water tends to dissolve the fuel and other components and ends up becoming highly radioactive as these materials are deposited in the water. This is mitigated by using particular alloys for the tubes and processing the fuel into a ceramic form. While effective at reducing the rate of dissolution, this adds to the cost of processing the fuel while also requiring materials that are both non-corrosive while also being less susceptible to neutron embrittlement. More of an issue is the fact that water has a low boiling point, limiting the operating temperatures.

This was the basic premise of the organic nuclear reactor design. In the CANDU layout, the moderator and coolant both used heavy water, but there was no reason for this other than expediency. Since the bulk of the moderation occurred in the calandria mass, replacing the small amount of heavy water in the fuel tubes with some other coolant was straightforward, unlike conventional light water designs where some other moderator would have to be added. (Note: As is the case in the UK's Magnox designs, which used graphite as the moderator and carbon dioxide gas as the coolant.) Using oil meant the issues with corrosion were greatly reduced, allowing more conventional metals to be used while also reducing the amount of dissolved fuel, and in turn, radiation in the cooling system. The organic liquid that was selected, OS-84, is a mixture of terphenyls treated catalytically with hydrogen to produce 40 percent saturated hydrocarbons. The terphenyls are petrochemical derivatives that were readily available and were already in use as heat transfer media.

Additionally, by using a material with a higher boiling point, the reactor could be operated at higher temperatures. This not only reduced the amount of coolant needed to remove a given amount of energy, and thereby reduced the physical size of the core, but also increases the efficiency of the turbines used to extract this energy for electrical generation. WR-1 ran with outlet temperatures up to 425 °C, compared to about 310 °C in the conventional CANDU. This also meant that there is no need to pressurize the cooling fluid beyond what is needed to force it through the cooling tubes at the required rate, whereas water must be held under high pressure to allow it to reach higher temperatures. This allowed the fuel tubes to be made thinner, reducing the number of neutrons lost in interactions with the tubing, and further increasing the neutron economy.

The reactor had vertical fuel channels, in contrast with the normal CANDU arrangement where the tubes are horizontal. The reactor did not use conventional control rods, but relied on control of the level of the heavy water moderator to adjust the power output. The reactor could be shut down quickly (SCRAMed) by the rapid dumping of the moderator.

=== Commercialization ===
In 1971 AECL initiated design engineering of a 500 MWe CANDU-OCR, based on uranium carbide fuel. Carbide fuels would corrode in water but not the oil coolant. Carbide fuels were much easier to produce than the more complex ceramics being used in most reactor designs. This design effort was shut down in 1973, but WR-1 tested the concept anyway. Another possibility was to use metallic fuel, which would increase the density of the fuel and offer higher burnup. The metallic fuel conducts heat better so that a higher power core could be used in the same space.

== Accidents ==
There were three loss-of-coolant-accidents that took place at WR-1 over its lifetime. Two reached the Winnipeg River. The first leak was in 1967, where approximately 300 litres of coolant reached the river through the outfall (the discharge point of the liquid waste) as a result of a pin-hole leak in one of the tubes in the heat exchanger. The second leak took place in 1977: AECL calculated that between 900 kg and 1,100 kg of coolant was deposited on the riverbed up to 1 km downstream of the outfall, and was subsequently cleaned up and monitored. The third coolant leak occurred in 1978 where the leaked coolant was cleaned up and stored on site and no coolant was released into the river. In 2006, AECL analyzed river sediment core samples at areas downstream of the site where deposits from the outfall were found. AECL concluded that there was no contamination of the river sediments that would have an ecological impact or affect human health.

== Status ==
WR1 was shut down for the last time for economic reasons, on May 17, 1985 although it was the youngest of AECL's large research reactors. The reactor is in an interim decommissioning stage, defuelled and largely disassembled. The site will be returned to greenfield status at the end of decommissioning.

== See also ==
- Gentilly Nuclear Generating Station, a boiling-water cooled CANDU reactor

== Bibliography ==
- Saunders, Chris (2016). Whiteshell Laboratories. Whiteshell History Committee.
