= Fusion Nuclear Science Facility =

Fusion Nuclear Science Facility (FNSF) is a low cost, low aspect ratio compact tokamak reactor design, aiming for a 9 Tesla field at the plasma centre.

It is considered a step after ITER on the path to a fusion power plant.

Because of the high neutron irradiation damage expected, non-insulating superconducting coils are being considered for it.
