= Cis-2,3-dihydrobiphenyl-2,3-diol dehydrogenase =

Class of enzymes

cis-2,3-dihydrobiphenyl-2,3-diol dehydrogenase

Identifiers
- EC no.: 1.3.1.56

Databases
- IntEnz: IntEnz view
- BRENDA: BRENDA entry
- ExPASy: NiceZyme view
- KEGG: KEGG entry
- MetaCyc: metabolic pathway
- PRIAM: profile
- PDB structures: RCSB PDB PDBe PDBsum
- Gene Ontology: AmiGO / QuickGO
Search
- PMC: articles
- PubMed: articles
- NCBI: proteins

In enzymology, cis-2,3-dihydrobiphenyl-2,3-diol dehydrogenase (EC 1.3.1.56) is an enzyme that catalyzes the chemical reaction

3-phenylcyclohexa-3,5-diene-1,2-diol
+ NAD^{+}
H^{+}
H^{+}
biphenyl-2,3-diol
+ NADH

The two substrates of this enzyme are (1S,2R)-3-phenylcyclohexa-3,5-diene-1,2-diol and oxidised nicotinamide adenine dinucleotide (NAD^{+}). Its products are biphenyl-2,3-diol, reduced NADH, and a proton.

This enzyme belongs to the family of oxidoreductases, specifically those acting on the CH-CH group of donor with NAD+ or NADP+ as acceptor. The systematic name of this enzyme class is cis-3-phenylcyclohexa-3,5-diene-1,2-diol:NAD+ oxidoreductase. This enzyme is also called 2,3-dihydro-2,3-dihydroxybiphenyl dehydrogenase. This enzyme participates in biphenyl degradation.
