= Organic nuclear reactor =

Nuclear reactor cooled or moderated by an organic liquid

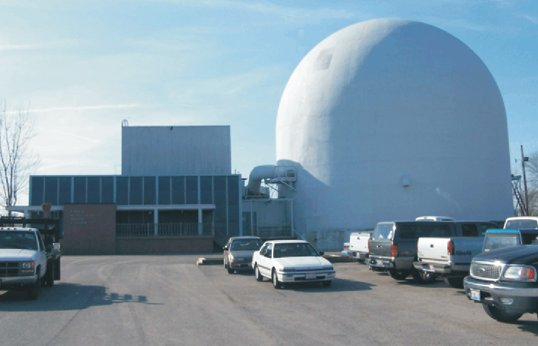
The Piqua Nuclear Power Facility in Ohio, a demonstration OCR.

An Organic nuclear reactor or Organic-cooled reactor (OCR) is a class of nuclear reactor in which the primary coolant or neutron moderator is an organic fluid.

Organic coolants have some advantages over light water, including low-pressure operation and decreased corrosion; however they suffer from flammability and degradation under neutron bombardment. Four demonstration organic-cooled reactors were constructed in the mid-20th century, but the technology was never commercialized.

== Design principles ==
Organic reactors use an organic hydrocarbon fluid, such as terphenyl, to cool the reactor core or to moderate neutrons. Several designs use the organic coolant as the neutron moderator, similar to a pressurized water reactor (PWR). This is the simplest solution from a construction and operational point of view, and saw significant development in the US, where the PWR design was already common. Alternatively, a separate moderator such as graphite can be used, or heavy water as in the WR-1. Other possible moderators include beryllium, beryllium oxide, and zirconium hydride.

Similar to a boiling water reactor (BWR), a boiling organic-cooled reactor is also possible, aided by the fact that suitable organic fluids superheat on their own when they expand into gas. Such a reactor could operate on a direct cycle at significantly lower pressure than a BWR.

=== Advantages ===
Organic coolants have high boiling points and low vapor pressures, allowing reactor operation at temperatures comparable to light-water reactors without requiring high pressure.

Nuclear fuel must be inserted into a cladding tube to contain the fission products produced in the fuel. Because water dissolves most structural metals, fuel must be inserted into a zirconium alloy cladding tube while the rest of the reactor has to be built out of materials such as stainless steel or Inconel that are both corrosion resistant and resistant to the effects of neutron embrittlement. In contrast, many common organic fluids are less corrosive to metals, allowing the fuel assemblies to be much simpler and the coolant pipes to be built of less-expensive carbon steels. In most examples the fuel was metallic uranium with a simple cladding of stainless steel or aluminum.

Some organics also have the advantage that they do not flash into gas in the same fashion as water, thus there is no real possibility of a steam explosion. Other potential explosion sources in water-cooled designs also include the buildup of hydrogen gas caused when the zirconium cladding heats; lacking such a cladding, or any similar material anywhere in the reactor, the only source of hydrogen gas in an oil-cooled design is from the chemical breakdown of the coolant. This occurs at a relatively predictable rate, and the possibility of a hydrogen buildup is extremely remote. This greatly reduces the required containment systems.

=== Disadvantages ===
Organic-based coolants have a few disadvantages which include their relative heat transfer capability, roughly half that of water, which requires increased flow rates to remove the same amount of energy. Another issue is that they tend to decompose at high temperatures and none could be expected to operate for extended periods above 530°C. Several organic coolants are also flammable which presents operational and safety considerations.

Another issue is that for oil moderators, the moderating capability of the fluid decreases as its temperature increases. This in turn causes the overall reaction rate of the reactor to slow and further cool the reactor. In many reactors, such a negative temperature coefficient is an important safety feature. However, in the case of an oil moderator, the temperature coefficient is so strong that it can rapidly cool the reactor, making load following difficult.

The largest problem for hydrocarbon coolants is that they decompose when exposed to radiation, also known as radiolysis. In contrast to heat-based decomposition, which tends to make lighter hydrocarbons, the outcome of these reactions is highly variable and results in many different reaction products. Water also undergoes decomposition due to radiation, but the output products are hydrogen and oxygen, which are easily recombined into water again. The resultant products of the decomposition of oils are not readily recombined, and have to be removed.

One particularly worrying type of reaction occurred when the resulting products polymerized into long-chain molecules. The concern was that these would form large masses within the reactor, and especially its cooling loops, and might "exert significant deleterious effects on the operation of a reactor". It was polymerization of the coolant sticking to the fuel cladding that led to the shutdown of the Piqua reactor after only three years of operation.

== History ==
=== Early experiments ===
Early theoretical work on the organic cooled concept was carried out by the United States Atomic Energy Commission (AEC) at Argonne National Laboratory between 1953 and 1956. As part of this work, Mine Safety Appliances studied a variety of potential biphenyl coolants. In 1956–75, Aerojet conducted studies on the rate of "burnout" of polyphenyl coolants, and in the following two years, Hanford Atomic Products carried out several studies of polyphenyl irradiation.

Monsanto began operating a single coolant loop in the Brookhaven Graphite Research Reactor beginning in 1955 to study heat transfer, and in 1958 began to consider coolant reclamation and studies on boiling diphenyl coolant loops. Atomic Energy of Canada Limited (AECL) began similar studies around the same time, with an eye to the design of a future test reactor.

A similar program began in the UK at Harwell in the 1950s. This soon focused on radiation damage to organic compounds, specifically polyphenyls. Around 1960, Euratom began studies of such designs as part of their ORGEL project. A similar but separate project began in Italy under the direction of the Comitato nazionale per l'energia nucleare, but their PRO design was never built. Likewise, a major study carried out in Denmark considered the heavy water-moderated reactor.

=== Major experiments ===
The first complete organically cooled and moderated reactor design was the Organic Moderated Reactor Experiment (OMRE), which began construction at the Idaho National Laboratory in 1955 and went critical in 1957. This used biphenyl and Santowax (commercial name of an isomeric mixture of terphenyl) for coolant and moderation and operation was generally acceptable. The reactor was a very low-energy design, producing 15 MW thermal, and operated for only a short period between 1957 and 1963. During this time the core was rebuilt three times to test different fuels, coolants and operating conditions from 260 to 370 C. It was planned that a larger 40 MW design, the terphenyl-cooled Experimental Organic Cooled Reactor (EOCR), would take over from the OMRE. It began construction at Idaho in 1962, but was never loaded with fuel when the AEC shifted their focus mostly to light water reactors.

The next major reactor was a commercial prototype, the Piqua Nuclear Power Facility, which began construction in 1963 at Piqua, Ohio. It was funded as a private/public venture as part of the AEC's Power Reactor Demonstration Program. This used the same Santowax coolant as the original OMRE, but was as large as the EOCR, producing 45 MW thermal and 15 MW electrical. It ran on 1.5% enriched fuel formed into annular tubes that were clad in finned aluminum casings. It ran only for a short time until 1966, when it was shut down due to films building up on the fuel cladding, formed from radiation degraded coolant. The reactor was prepared to receive a second core for future research, but this plan was cancelled in 1968 after the cancellation of the HWOCR program and the reactor was decommissioned instead.

Although various European nations did development work on organic reactor designs, only the Soviet Union built one. The ARBUS (АРБУС) reactor was an experimental organic-cooled research reactor operated by the Research Institute of Atomic Reactors. Work on the 5 MW thermal ARBUS (АРБУС) NPS began in Melekess, Russia in 1963 and it ran until 1979. It produced a maximum of 750 kW of electricity. The research reactor was used to investigate coolant stability, radiolysis, and materials compatibility under irradiation, as well as the use of standard carbon steels in reactor construction. In 1979 it was rebuilt as the AST-1, this time to deliver 12 MW of process heat instead of electrical power. It ran in this form until 1988. Like its Western counterparts, the program identified coolant degradation and chemistry control as limiting factors.

The most powerful ONR was the Canadian 60 MW thermal WR-1. AECL had investigated the use of organic coolants for the next generation of CANDU reactors, and commissioned an organic-cooled heavy-water reactor to explore the concept. It began construction at the newly formed Whiteshell Laboratories in Manitoba in 1965 and went critical late that year. Midway through construction, the concept was abandoned for use in CANDU reactors, however AECL continued operation of the WR-1 to advance research into the technology elsewhere, particularly for the US-Canadian HWOCR program. WR-1 used heavy water as the moderator and terphenyls as the coolant, and did not suffer from the problems with coolant breakdown seen in the US designs. WR-1 achieved reliable sustained operations for nearly 20 years as a materials test reactor with an availability factor of 85%. It operated until 1985, by which time AECL had standardized on using heavy water for both the moderator and the coolant, and the organic cooled design was no longer being considered for development. It is generally regarded as the most successful organic-cooled reactor.

=== Heavy Water Organic Cooled Reactor (HWOCR) Program ===
The Heavy Water Organic Cooled Reactor (HWOCR) program was a joint U.S.–Canadian reactor development effort in the late 1950s and 1960s led by the US AEC and Canada’s AECL.

At the time, the AEC was concerned by the limited supply of uranium ore compared to the predicted increase in nuclear power demand by the end of the century. This concern drove research into the breeder cycle and other ways of extending the nuclear fuel supply such as using thorium as fertile material. Heavy-water reactors (HWR) were already under consideration by the AEC due to their excellent neutron economy, and the HWOCR program was devised to improve the operating characteristics of HWRs using lessons from the Piqua facility. While the LWR consumed enormous amounts of uranium ore for its fuel, fast breeder reactors (FBR) or thorium-HEU converter reactors like the HWR or the high-temperature gas-cooled reactor tested at Peach Bottom would use significantly less uranium until FBRs producing plutonium or molten-salt breeders using a thorium fuel cycle could be developed. A heavy-water organic-cooled reactor was flexible enough to use either thorium-HEU or natural uranium.

The program was initiated in January 1965; Atomics International and Combustion Engineering were chosen to oversee the project. The AEC signed an agreement with AECL, allowing the use of the WR-1 and NRU reactors and two test loops at Whiteshell to support the HWOCR program, as well as for the two countries to share information on OCR technology.The program involved the design of a reference 1000 MW_{e} commercial plant designed for both power generation and desalination, with plans to build a smaller demonstration plant in the United States in the early 1970s. It envisioned a demonstrator HWOCR plant in the 300–500 MW_{e} range, comparable to contemporary CANDU and LWR units at the time.

The HWOCR was designed as a commercially scalable concept, combining heavy-water moderation with an organic liquid coolant to achieve low operating pressure, minimal corrosion and activation, and low radiation fields. It was to use slightly enriched uranium carbide fuel rods with sintered aluminum powder (SAP) cladding and Santowax-OM coolant.

The program was terminated in 1967 following the U.S. withdrawal for budgetary reasons and a political push to standardize on LWRs, rather than because of technical shortcomings. The HWOCR was widely regarded as a mature, commercially viable reactor concept that was halted before a full-scale power plant could be built. Dr. Chauncey Starr, founder of the Electric Power Research Institute, stated in 1995:

“In 1967, when most alternative reactor projects had been stopped by the AEC for budgetary reasons, the AEC also withdrew unilaterally from the joint HWOCR program, to the consternation of the Canadians. The HWOCR design was ready for construction, and needed a substantial financial commitment. AECL felt unable to make this commitment alone. This was a regrettable outcome, as I am strongly of the opinion that organic cooling would have opened the door to simpler and safer reactors. The experience at Whiteshell and at Piqua showed that the organic cooled reactor was trouble-free and especially easy to operate and to maintain, as compared to other concepts. In particular, the radiation field around the primary cooling circuit was very low, permitting inspection and maintenance while the reactor was operating. I believe that the importance of simplicity in man-machine interactions for economic and safe reactor operation has been underrated-by the AEC and its successors, by the regulators, and by the industry.”

=== Renewed interest ===
Despite the successful demonstrations of Arbus and WR-1, and the design work done for the HWOCR program, organic-cooled reactors have received little interest in the US following the cancellation of the HWOCR and have been largely ignored since.

Indian officials have periodically expressed interest in reviving the concept. They initially received CANDU design materials during the period of the WR-1 experiment. To further lower operational costs, there have been several revivals of the WR-1-like concept. It is believed that an organic coolant purification system can be developed to handle the decomposition of the organic coolant, and research has begun to this effect. However, as of 2026, no experimental system has been constructed.

== Operational Experience ==
=== WR-1 and Piqua Lessons Learned ===
WR-1 employed an organic heat-transfer fluid as its primary coolant which avoided the mechanical stresses, corrosion, and embrittlement concerns seen in high-pressure PWRs and BWRs. This coolant allowed WR-1 to achieve near-steam-cycle temperatures without PWR/BWR pressure boundaries and demonstrated that an organic coolant could be integrated into a pressure-tube, heavy-water moderated reactor design with stable heat removal characteristics.

During sustained operations, WR-1 experienced some radiolysis and thermal degradation of the organic coolant caused by neutron and gamma irradiation and prolonged high-temperature exposure. Neutron activation of the WR-1 organic coolant was minimal and operationally insignificant while corrosion rates in the primary system remained very low with proper materials selection. As a result, operational issues were dominated by coolant chemistry management and maintenance rather than structural degradation of pressure boundaries. These processes produced lighter hydrocarbons, dissolved gases, acidic species, and heavier polymeric by-products, leading to coolant darkening and particulate buildup in pumps, valves, and heat-exchange surfaces. AECL mitigated these effects through online purification systems, filtration, and periodic coolant reconditioning, maintaining system operability within operational limits.

Operational radiation surveys at WR-1 confirmed that dose rates in the organic coolant system were driven mainly by trace fission product contamination and surface plate-out, rather than by neutron activation of the coolant itself. This significantly reduced radiation exposure during maintenance and inspection activities compared with water-cooled reactor primary systems, where activated coolant is a dominant contributor to occupational dose. Unlike light-water reactor coolants, the organic fluid did not contain oxygen or nitrogen as intrinsic constituents, eliminating dominant activation pathways such as the production of ¹⁶N that drives high gamma dose rates in PWR and BWR primary systems. Furthermore, the measured tritium levels and other activation products associated with the organic coolant were orders of magnitude lower than those observed in light-water reactor primary systems.

While WR-1 did experience three documented coolant leaks over its near 20-year operating life, these incidents behaved like traditional hydrocarbon releases rather than radiological emergencies, as the coolant did not become significantly radioactive. Corrective actions included coolant containment or recovery, sediment cleanup in affected areas, and mechanical and procedural upgrades to prevent recurrence. In all cases, the incidents were handled as chemical release issues rather than nuclear safety events, demonstrating a key distinction between organic coolant behavior and traditional water-cooled accident scenarios.

WR-1 proved that organic coolants can be operated safely, effectively, and with stable heat transfer when the reactor design is purpose-built for them. Piqua failed not because the coolant concept was inherently flawed, but because the reactor system architecture was mismatched to the coolant's operational performance requirements. In modern reactor design terms, WR-1 provided the proof-of-concept, while Piqua demonstrated the misapplication of the concept.

WR-1 operated well because the reactor design, operational envelope, and coolant performance through chemistry controls were aligned from the start. By combining a low-pressure organic coolant with a CANDU-like pressure-tube configuration and heavy-water moderation, AECL paired the coolant's strengths—low pressure, thermal stability, and minimal corrosion—with a system that did not depend on high mechanical loads. It was a purpose-built match of coolant operational performance to reactor system architecture.

Piqua, by contrast, used an inferior organic coolant and moderator with poor melting/pour point characteristics into a reactor designed much more like a light-water reactor (LWR) than like WR-1, resulting in chronic contamination issues, coolant handling risks, and maintenance burdens the plant was never engineered to support. These design choices is the key reason why Piqua performed poorly. Where WR-1 validated the feasibility of organic cooling as a highly reliable nuclear generation concept, Piqua illustrated that the coolant could not simply be treated as a substitute for water in an existing reactor architectural layout.

Criteria	WR-1 (Canada) Success Case	Piqua (USA) Failure Case
Design Fit	CANDU-like design matched coolant with operational envelope	Inferior organic coolant choice mismatched to operational envelope
Operations	1966-1986 (20 years)	1963-1966 (3 years)
Power Output	60 MWth	45 MWth
Organic Coolant	HB-40	Santowax OMP
Moderator	Heavy Water	Santowax OMP
Coolant Melting/Pour Point	-24^{o}C	85^{o}C
Coolant Chemistry Control	Dedicated purification and filtration systems & coolant monitoring	Insufficient chemistry management and coolant cleanup capability
Operational Performance	Achieved high reliability and sustained operational performance with >85% availability factor	Reliability and contamination issues, high maintenance burden, and poor availability led to early shutdown
Coolant-Reactor System Match	Organic fluid with low pressure operations yielded highly reliable operational performance	Poor organic coolant/moderator choice in a LWR inspired design yielded persistent operational issues

=== Coolant Leakage ===
There were three leakage events that took place at WR-1 over its 20-year lifetime:

1. August 1967: A pinhole leak developed in a heat exchanger tube releasing approximately 300 litres of organic coolant into the Winnipeg River via the plant's outfall drainage system. This incident prompted design and operational changes such as additional valves and notification systems to help prevent future events.
2. January–May 1977: A prolonged, low-volume leak occurred over several months, estimated to release about 1,450 kg of organic coolant into the Winnipeg river. AECL calculated that 900–1,100 kg of this product settled into the riverbed sediments up to about 1 km downstream of the plant's discharge point, with small amounts found farther downstream on both banks.The cause was attributed to slow leaks from primary cooling circuits rather than a single rupture. This led to corrective measures to address the affected seals in the coolant system to prevent future leaks.
3. November 1978 (No Release): A pump failure caused an organic coolant leak estimated at 3,270 kg within plant systems. Unlike the previous events, no coolant was directly discharged into the Winnipeg River. Most of the leaked coolant was recovered, contained, and stored on site, and operating procedures were revised to help prevent recurrence.

Despite sediment detection, river water samples generally showed organic coolant levels below analytical detection limits, indicating limited aqueous dispersion of dissolved contaminants. Biological sampling during follow-up monitoring did not show internal contamination or elevated mortality attributable to WR-1 organic coolant residues. Furthermore, multiagency reviews — including Environment Canada and Health Canada participation — concluded that river water downstream of the WR-1 site met Canadian drinking water guidelines, with no evidence that the coolant releases posed measurable human health risks. In 2006, AECL analyzed river sediment core samples at areas downstream of the site where deposits from the outfall were found. AECL concluded that there was no contamination of the river sediments that would have an ecological impact or affect human health.

=== Key WR-1 Operational Takeaways ===
The WR-1 organic coolant contained only carbon and hydrogen and was not the neutron moderator, hence, neutron activation products were minimal, short-lived, and operationally insignificant—making coolant behavior chemical rather than radiological in both routine operation and leak scenarios. Because of this, the WR-1 leakage events behaved as chemical releases rather than radiological incidents. Environmental assessments following the coolant leaks concluded that the primary hazards were chemical, not radiological, and emergency response actions typical of activated water releases in PWRs/BWRs were not required. This distinction was repeatedly cited by AECL as a favorable operational characteristic of organic-cooled reactor systems.

== List of organic nuclear reactors ==
From Shirvan Koroush and Eric Forrest. “Design of an Organic Simplified Nuclear Reactor.”

Name	Country	Operation period	Coolant/Moderator	Power	Fuel
Organic Moderated Reactor Experiment	United States	1957-1963	Santowax	15 MW_{t}	Plate-type cermet (Cores 1-3); U-3.8 Mo-0.2 Al alloy (Core 4)
Piqua Nuclear Power Facility	United States	1963-1966	Santowax	11 MW_{e}	Annular U-3.5 Mo-0.2 Al/Si alloy
Arbus Reactor	Soviet Union	1963-1979 (NPS); 1979-1988 (AST-1)	Gasoil	750 kW_{e} (NPS); 12 MW_{t} (AST-1)	Plate-type metallic UAl (NPS); Hexagonal tube cermet (AST-1)
WR-1	Canada	1965-1985	HB-40 coolant, D_{2}O moderator	60 MW_{t}	UC
