= 2,3-dihydroxy-2,3-dihydro-p-cumate dehydrogenase =

Class of enzymes

Identifiers
- EC no.: 1.3.1.58

Databases
- IntEnz: IntEnz view
- BRENDA: BRENDA entry
- ExPASy: NiceZyme view
- KEGG: KEGG entry
- MetaCyc: metabolic pathway
- PRIAM: profile
- PDB structures: RCSB PDB PDBe PDBsum
- Gene Ontology: AmiGO / QuickGO
Search
- PMC: articles
- PubMed: articles
- NCBI: proteins

In enzymology, 2,3-dihydroxy-2,3-dihydro-p-cumate dehydrogenase (EC 1.3.1.58) is an enzyme that catalyzes the chemical reaction

2,3-dihydroxy-2,3-dihydro-p-cumic acid
+ NAD^{+}
H^{+}
H^{+}
2,3-dihydroxy-p-cumic acid
+ NADH

The two substrates of this enzyme are (2S,3R)-2,3-dihydroxy-2,3-dihydro-p-cumic acid and oxidised nicotinamide adenine dinucleotide (NAD^{+}). Its products are 2,3-dihydroxy-p-cumic acid, reduced NADH, and a proton.

This enzyme belongs to the family of oxidoreductases, specifically those acting on the CH-CH group of donor with NAD+ or NADP+ as acceptor. The systematic name of this enzyme class is cis-2,3-dihydroxy-2,3-dihydro-p-cumate:NAD+ oxidoreductase. This enzyme participates in biphenyl degradation.
