= Terthiophene =

- Terthiophene

Names
- Preferred IUPAC name 1^{2},2^{2}:2^{5},3^{2}-Terthiophene
- Other names α-Terthienyl; 2,5-Di(2-thienyl)thiophene

Identifiers
CAS Number	1081-34-1
3D model (JSmol)	Interactive image
Beilstein Reference	178604
ChEBI	CHEBI:10335
ChEMBL	ChEMBL90017
ChemSpider	58578
ECHA InfoCard	100.168.218
EC Number	640-441-1
KEGG	C08460
PubChem CID	65067
RTECS number	WZ9717750
UNII	0P77RAU2RR
CompTox Dashboard (EPA)	DTXSID2041206
- InChI: InChI=1S/C12H8S3/c1-3-9(13-7-1)11-5-6-12(15-11)10-4-2-8-14-10/h1-8H Key: KXSFECAJUBPPFE-UHFFFAOYSA-N; InChI=1/C12H8S3/c1-3-9(13-7-1)11-5-6-12(15-11)10-4-2-8-14-10/h1-8H Key: KXSFECAJUBPPFE-UHFFFAOYAI
- SMILES: s1cccc1c2sc(cc2)c3sccc3

Properties
Chemical formula	C_{12}H_{8}S_{3}
Molar mass	248.39 g/mol
Appearance	pale yellow solid
Melting point	93-95 °C
Solubility in water	insoluble

Hazards
- Occupational safety and health (OHS/OSH)
Main hazards	flammable
- GHS labelling
Pictograms	(GHS07: Exclamation mark)
Signal word	Warning
Hazard statements	H315, H319, H335
Precautionary statements	P261, P264, P271, P280, P302+P352, P304+P340, P305+P351+P338, P312, P332+P313, P337+P313, P362, P403+P233, P405, P501

Related compounds
Related compounds	Thiophene polythiophene
- Except where otherwise noted, data are given for materials in their standard state (at 25 °C [77 °F], 100 kPa). verify (what is ?) Infobox references

Terthiophene is the organic compound with the formula [C_{4}H_{3}S]_{2}C_{4}H_{2}S. It is an oligomer of the heterocycle thiophene, a shorter oligomer is dithienyl, and the parent polymer is polythiophene. In the most common isomer of terthiophene, two thienyl groups are connected via their 2 positions to a central thiophene, also at the carbon atoms flanking the sulfur.

== Preparation of terthiophene ==
Terthiophene is prepared by the nickel- or palladium-catalysed coupling reaction of 2,5-dibromothiophene with the Grignard reagent derived from 2-bromothiophene.

== Properties and applications ==
This substance is likely responsible for the insecticidal activity of Tagetes minuta as it can react with light and oxygen to make singlet oxygen.

Together with derivatives of 2,2'-bithiophene, various chlorinated terthiophenes occur naturally in thistles.

Terthiophene has been employed as building block for the organic semi-conductor polythiophene.

== See also ==
- Biphenyl
- Terphenyl
- Terpyridine
