= Neutron-induced swelling =

Materials science issue

Neutron-induced swelling is the increase of volume and decrease of density of materials subjected to intense neutron radiation. Neutrons impacting the material's lattice rearrange its atoms, causing buildup of dislocations, voids, and Wigner energy. Together with the resulting strength reduction and embrittlement, it is a major concern for materials for nuclear reactors.

Materials show significant differences in their swelling resistance.

Radiation can induce voids and bubbles that lead to 10s% of increase in volume (i.e. void swelling).

== See also ==
- Radiation damage
- Neutron embrittlement
- Irradiation
- Void swelling
