= Power Reactor Demonstration Program =

US Atomic Energy Commission initiative (1955–1970)

The Power Reactor Demonstration Program (PRDP) (Note: Sometimes referred to as the Power Demonstration Reactor Program (PDRP) or as the Cooperative Power Reactor Demonstration Program.) was an initiative of the United States Atomic Energy Commission to fund the research and development of nuclear power in the United States. Review and funding of projects took place between 1955 and 1963 over three distinct rounds.

The program co-funded the following facilities:

Round	Facility name	Type	Capacity (MWe)	State	Commissioned
1	Yankee Rowe	PWR	180	Massachusetts	1961
1	Hallam	SGR	75	Nebraska	1963
1	Fermi 1	SFR	150	Michigan	1966
2	Piqua	OCR	45	Ohio	1963
2	Elk River	BWR	22	Minnesota	1964
2	La Crosse	BWR	50	Wisconsin	1969
3	Carolinas-Virginia Tube Reactor	PHWR	17	South Carolina	1963
3	Big Rock Point	BWR	67	Michigan	1963
3	Pathfinder	BWR	59	South Dakota	1966
3	Peach Bottom	HTGR	40	Pennsylvania	1966
3	San Onofre	PWR	436	California	1968
3	Connecticut Yankee	PWR	560	Connecticut	1968
