= Neutron irradiation damage =

Material changes caused by high neutron flux

Neutron irradiation damage refers to material changes caused by high neutron flux, typically in a nuclear reactor after many years.

Graphite may shrink and then swell.

== See also ==
- Neutron embrittlement
- Neutron radiation#Effects on materials
