= 2,2'-Bithiophene =

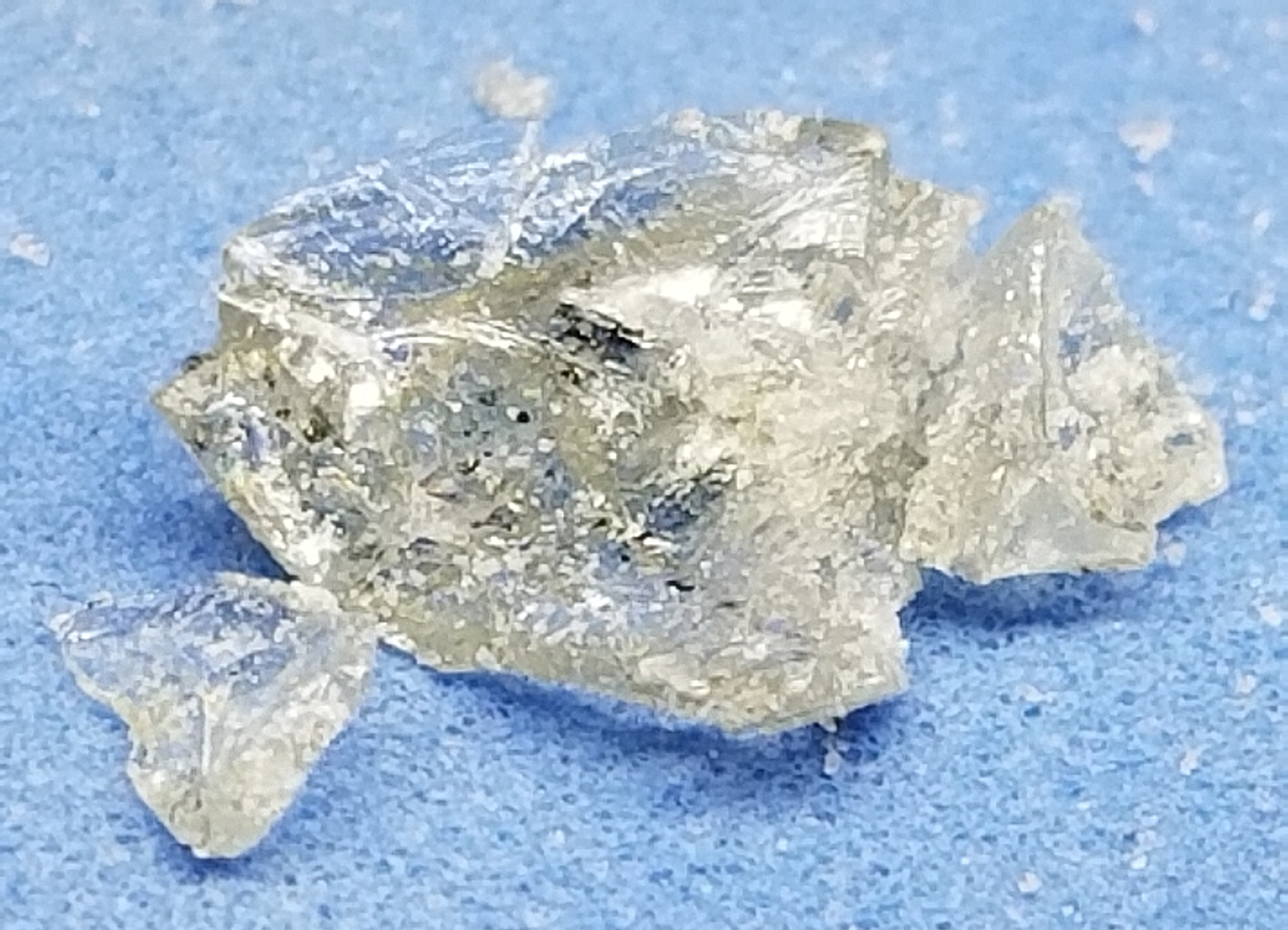

Names
- Preferred IUPAC name 2,2′-Bithiophene
- Other names 2,2′-Bisthiophene, 2,2′-dithienyl, 2,2′-bithienyl, 2-(2-thienyl)thiophene

Identifiers
CAS Number	492-97-7
3D model (JSmol)	Interactive image
ChemSpider	61428
ECHA InfoCard	100.007.062
EC Number	207-767-2
PubChem CID	68120
UNII	8CTS9HJ7L6
CompTox Dashboard (EPA)	DTXSID8060084
- InChI: InChI=1S/C8H6S2/c1-3-7(9-5-1)8-4-2-6-10-8/h1-6H Key: OHZAHWOAMVVGEL-UHFFFAOYSA-N; InChI=1/C8H6S2/c1-3-7(9-5-1)8-4-2-6-10-8/h1-6H Key: OHZAHWOAMVVGEL-UHFFFAOYAB
- SMILES: c1cc(sc1)c2cccs2

Properties
Chemical formula	C_{8}H_{6}S_{2}
Molar mass	166.26 g·mol^{−1}
Appearance	Colorless crystals
Density	1.44 g/cm^{3}
Melting point	31.1 °C (88.0 °F; 304.2 K)
Boiling point	260 °C (500 °F; 533 K)

Structure
Crystal structure	Monoclinic
Space group	P2_{1}/c
Lattice constant	a = 7.873 A, b = 5.771 A, c = 8.813 A α = 90°, β = 107.07°, γ = 90°
Coordination geometry	2
- Except where otherwise noted, data are given for materials in their standard state (at 25 °C [77 °F], 100 kPa). Infobox references

2,2′-Bithiophene is the organic compound. It is a colorless solid, although commercial samples are often greenish. It is the most common of the three isomers with formula (C_{4}H_{3}S)_{2}. The other two isomers have the connectivity 2,3′- and 3,3′-. The compound is typically prepared by cross-coupling starting from 2-halothiophenes.

X-ray crystallography shows that the two rings are coplanar, unlike the situation for biphenyl.

== Occurrence ==
A number of bi- as well as terthiophenes exist naturally, invariably with substituents at the positions flanking sulfur. In terms of the biosynthesis, bithiophenes are proposed to be derived from polyacetylenic precursors, which in turn are the products of dehydrogenation of oleic acid. According to some hypotheses, these polyalkynes form labile 1,2-dithiins via a reaction with H_{2}S_{2} or its equivalent.

== See also ==
- Thienothiophene - two fused thiophene rings
- Tetrathiafulvalene
