= Heptamethine dyes =

Heptamethine dyes are a subclass of chemical compounds within the cyanine dye family and have many uses as fluorescent dyes, particularly in biomedical imaging, the development of theranostics, the individualized treatment of cancerous patients with the aid of PDT, co-administration with other drugs, and irradiation.

The characteristics of heptamethine dyes can be understood by comparing research data on different dyes within the family. For example, the IR-780 dye exhibits a peak spectral absorption of around 780 nm.

== Optical properties ==
The absorption and fluorescence spectrum of heptamethine dyes are in the near infrared region and vary largely on the solvent and concentration. IR-808 absorbs mainly between 775 nm and 796 nm and emits fluorescence between 808 nm and 827 nm with a large red shift as expected in the serum sample. These absorption rates are important for their medical applications due to their image capturing capabilities. Dyes with good pharmacokinetics and fluorescence above 680 nm are considered viable in biomedical imaging due to their significant tissue penetration and imaging signature relative to background frequencies.

== Patents ==
International patents on the use of heptamethine dyes for use in photographic use have also been approved and instituted. Fuji Film placed a patent titled “Heptamethine cyanine compound, near infrared absorbing ink, near infrared absorbing sheet and silver halide photographic material” in 1999 and a follow-up international patent 6072059 in 2000.

Heptamethine dyes for near infrared fluorescent imaging are manufactured by such companies as Intrace Medical, Lumiprobe, Cyandye, LI-COR Biosciences - GmbH and others.
