= M-Terphenyl =

Organic ligand

m-Terphenyl
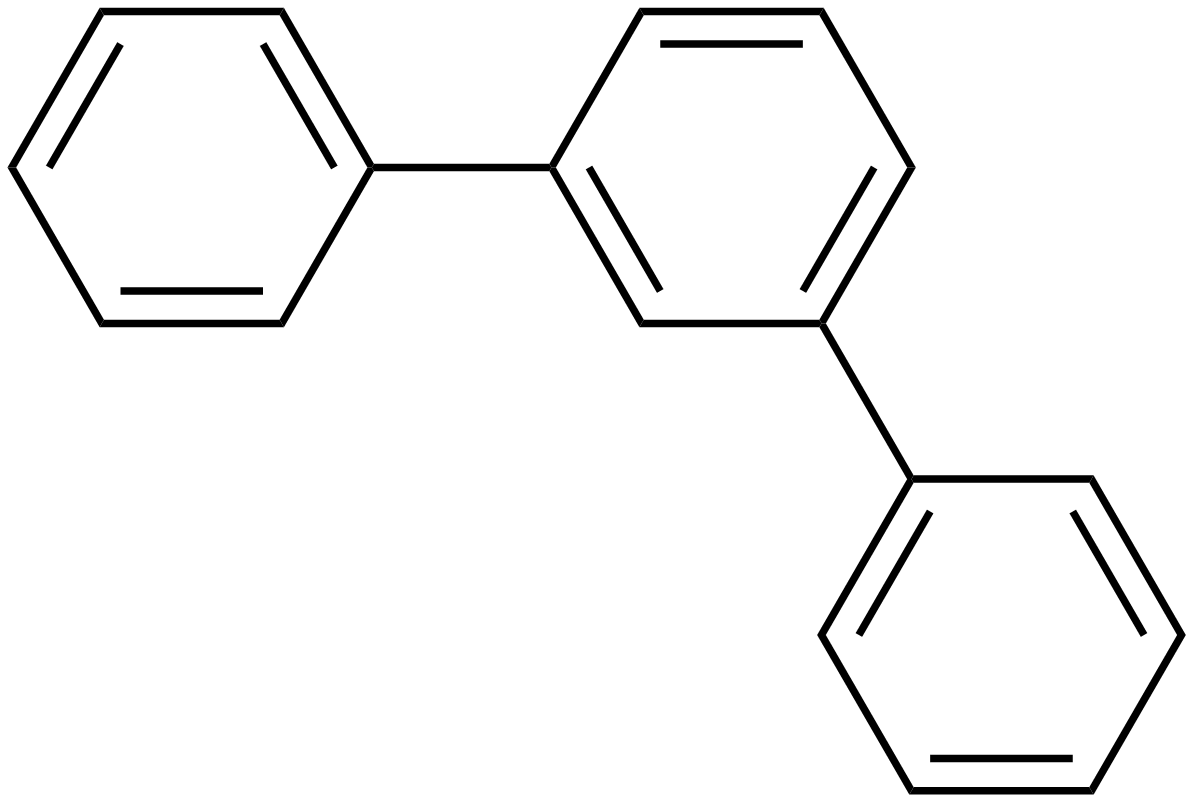

Names
- IUPAC name 1,3-diphenylbenzene
- Other names m-Terphenyl; 1,1'-Biphenyl, 3-phenyl-; 1,1':3',1''-Terphenyl; 1,3-Diphenylbenzene; 1,3-Terphenyl; AI3-00860; CCRIS 1656; EINECS 202–122–1; HSDB 2537; Isodiphenylbenzene; m-Diphenylbenzene; m-Triphenyl; NSC 6808; Santowax M; UNII-WOI2PSS0KX

Identifiers
CAS Number	92–06–8
3D model (JSmol)	Interactive image
ChEMBL	ChEMBL3184163
ChemSpider	6809
ECHA InfoCard	100.001.930
EC Number	202–122–1
PubChem CID	7076
CompTox Dashboard (EPA)	DTXSID2029117
- InChI: InChI=1S/C18H14/c1-3-8-15(9–4–1)17-12-7-13-18(14-17)16-10-5-2-6-11-16/h1-14H Key: YJTKZCDBKVTVBY-UHFFFAOYSA-N
- SMILES: C1=CC=C(C=C1)C2=CC(=CC=C2)C3=CC=CC=C3

Properties
Chemical formula	C_{18}H_{14}
Molar mass	230.310 g·mol^{−1}
Appearance	yellow needles
Density	1.23
Melting point	86–87 °C (187–189 °F; 359–360 K)
Boiling point	365
Solubility in water	1.51 mg/l

Hazards
- GHS labelling
Pictograms	(GHS09: Environmental hazard)
Signal word	Warning
Hazard statements	H410
Precautionary statements	P273, P391, P501
Flash point	191 °C (376 °F; 464 K)
- Except where otherwise noted, data are given for materials in their standard state (at 25 °C [77 °F], 100 kPa). Infobox references

m-Terphenyls (also known as meta-terphenyls, meta-diphenylbenzenes, or meta-triphenyls) are organic molecules composed of two phenyl groups bonded to a benzene ring in the one and three positions. The simplest formula is C_{18}H_{14}, but many different substituents can be added to create a diverse class of molecules. Due to the extensive pi-conjugated system, the molecule it has a range of optical properties and because of its size, it is used to control the sterics in reactions with metals and main group elements. This is because of the disubstituted phenyl rings, which create a pocket for molecules and elements to bond without being connected to anything else. It is a popular choice in ligand, and the most chosen amongst the terphenyls because of its benefits in regards to sterics. Although many commercial methods exist to create m-terphenyl compounds, they can also be found naturally in plants such as mulberry trees.

The basic structure of m-terphenyl with R representing the most common bonding site

== History ==
=== Discovery ===
The earliest known synthesis of meta-terphenyl was completed in 1866 by Pierre Eugène Marcellin Berthelot by heating benzene to high temperatures leading to a mixture of hydrocarbons including a mixture of meta-terphenyl and para-terphenyl. Meta-terphenyl was isolated in 1874 by Gustav Schultz (1851–1928) by taking the mixture of the compounds, mixing them in a solvent and allowing meta-terphenyl to melt off as it has a lower melting and boiling point than para-terphenyl. Meta-terphenyl, and other aromatic compounds, remained of much interest to scientists in throughout the end of the 20th century, with many of the physical properties being measured and compared during this time. This also led to the first alternate form of meta-terphenyl synthesis, which involved passing gaseous benzene and toluene through a hot glass tube.

=== Reactivity ===
By the 1930s, focus had shifted to experimenting with the reactivity of meta-terphenyl and its potential use as a ligand. The first verified modified version of meta-terphenyl was created in 1932 by Arthur Wardner and Alexander Lowy and led to the creation of nitro-substituted meta-terphenyls as well as amino-meta-terphenyls from the oxidation of the nitro-substituted compounds. Walter and Kathryn Cook halogenated meta-terphenyl with chlorine and bromine with further applications such as use in as Grignard reaction, the first such suggestion for meta-terphenyl as a ligand for a main group element. They later confirmed their results using the Stepanow Method. This trend continued with C.K. Breadsher and I. Swerlick publishing a review of all known reactions that meta-terphenyl could undergo. G. R. Ames also wrote an article detailing not only reactions of meta-terphenyls, but also covering all the different experimental methods to obtain meta-terphenyl known at the time.

=== Early synthetic methods ===
During this time, the method of producing meta-terphenyl had remained the same. While people did experiment with other ways to obtain the compound, for the most part the method of heating benzene in a glass tube remained the primary method. In 1948, however, G. Woods and Irwin Tucker put forth an alternative method. Instead of heating benzene, they found that a combination of dihydroresocinol and two equivalents of phenyllithium would create unsymmetrical meta-terphenyl molecules. This was significant as the previous method required the separation of meta-terphenyl from other compounds and this novel synthesis allowed meta-terphenyls to be the major product and much more easily isolatable. This method would remain the most popular form of making meta-terphenyls until the end of the 20th century.

Woods and Tucker mechanism for the creation of m-terphenyl.

It was during this time that it was discovered that meta-terphenyls occurred in nature. In 1975, Karl-Werner Glombitza, Hans-Willi Rauwald, and Gert Eckhardt isolated two meta-terphenyls from the algae Fugus vesiculosus. More naturally occurring meta-terphenyls have been isolated since then and have shown promising applications in the field of biochemistry.

== Synthesis ==
=== Hart Method ===
As the demand for meta-terphenyl and its derivatives grew through the latter half of the 20th century, it became necessary to increase the yield of reactions producing meta-terphenyls as well as have the ability to uniquely create symmetric and unsymmetric meta-terphenyls to investigate their reactivity as well utilize their increased steric control. Such a method was discovered by Akbar Saednya and Harold Hart in 1986. Using an excess of Grignard reagent that had a phenyl group attached, meta-terphenyl was able to be made quickly, in one step, with a relatively high yield. This method also allowed for a variety of meta-terphenyl compounds to be made as so long as it could successfully be made into a Grignard reagent.

Saedyna and Hart's initial proposed mechanism for making m-terphenyl

This method continues to remain very popular in terms of the creation of symmetrical meta-terphenyl compounds, but that has not stopped attempts to quicken synthesis, increase yield, and create more sterically bulky m-terphenyls. The method developed by Saednya and Hart has provided the basis for improved synthesis of meta-terphenyls and has often been used as a comparison when it comes to resulting structures and methods. Saednya and Hart continued their work and provided two alternate paths to create meta-terphenyls in 1996. One involved using a halogenated benzene and three equivalents of the phenyl group attached to the benzene. The second involved a dichloro-substituted benzene and butyl lithium followed by two equivalents of the Grignard reagents mentioned above. This led to increased yields of larger terphenyl compounds, however as the size of the substituents has been hypothesized to have a limit due to the increased steric hindrance of the molecule.

Sadenya and Hart's second proposed process of making m-terphenyl.

=== Other approaches ===
m-Terphenyl compounds can be prepared by reacting anionic diphenyl derivatives with functional ketones in a solution of potassium hydroxide and DMF in an ultrasound bath, a bulky meta-terphenyl molecule can be obtained. The yields are not high but the procedure ccan be completed within an hour. Additionally, meta-terphenyl synthesis has begun to become more focused. As opposed to general routes to produce common meta-terphenyl compounds, the shift has been to improve certain derivatives to accomplish particular goals. Examples of this include a method to produce a very sterically hindered meta-terphenyl with the purpose of forming phosphorus-phosphorus double bonds and a heavily fluorinated meta-terphenyl being produced to help stabilize silylium compounds. Additionally, reaction to add other bulky substituents to the center phenyl group has been shown to discourage rotation of the outer phenyl groups in hopes of stabilizing boron and silicon radicals and bonded complexes.

== Derivatives ==
=== Organometallics ===
Their large size can help to sterically force a certain reaction, however they are mainly used to stabilize compounds that would be unstable otherwise. Bulky meta-terphenyl ligands stabilize newly created bismuthenium and stibenium ions, the first reported carbene analogs that were not in Group 14. Additionally, meta-terphenyl ligands were used to stabilize phosphorus-phosphorus double bonds. This was proven multiple times with a variety of different meta-terphenyl compounds being used to confirm the result and led to the confirmation of the appropriate length of a phosphorus-phosphorus double bond. Organomagnesium compounds have been prepared using meta-terphenyl ligands.

m-Terphenyl ligands being used to stabilize a bismuth analogue of a carbene.

Organoiron, chromium, and manganese derivatives are also known.

M-terphenyls have also been quite helpful in getting preliminary structures of divalent lithium and sodium, although both molecules had substantial stabilization from the electron-rich meta-terphenyl group. M-terphenyls have also helped, along with the electronic support of sodium ions, to stabilize the first gallium-gallium triple bond, although this is contested due to the high coordination of the sodium atoms in the complex. A similar approach meshing the methods to form a phosphorus-phosphorus double bonds and a gallium-gallium triple bond allowed researched to create and isolate the first germanium-germanium double bond. Meta-terphenyl continues to play an important part of organometallic chemistry, as well as main group chemistry, due to its kinetic stabilization of molecules and its thermodynamic influence on the energies between molecules.

Example of m-terphenyl stabilizing an iron complex bonding though to methylene groups.

=== Biochemistry ===
Meta-terphenyl ligands can be used on their own in the field of biochemistry. Due to its composition and shape, meta-terphenyl can be used as the basis for the formation of synthetic proteins that can bind to carbohydrates, lectins. This is due to the large twisted shape of meta-terphenyl, when not hindered by bulkier substituents used in organometallics and main-group chemistry, which may opt to increase the rotational barrier of the molecule. In this way, synthetic receptors for sugars such as disaccharides can be bound temporarily before being used in further experiments. This process, while it continues to be developed, has many promising applications such as the prevention and treatment of bacterial infections.
