= Organic Moderated Reactor Experiment =

Decommissioned nuclear reactor experiment in Idaho

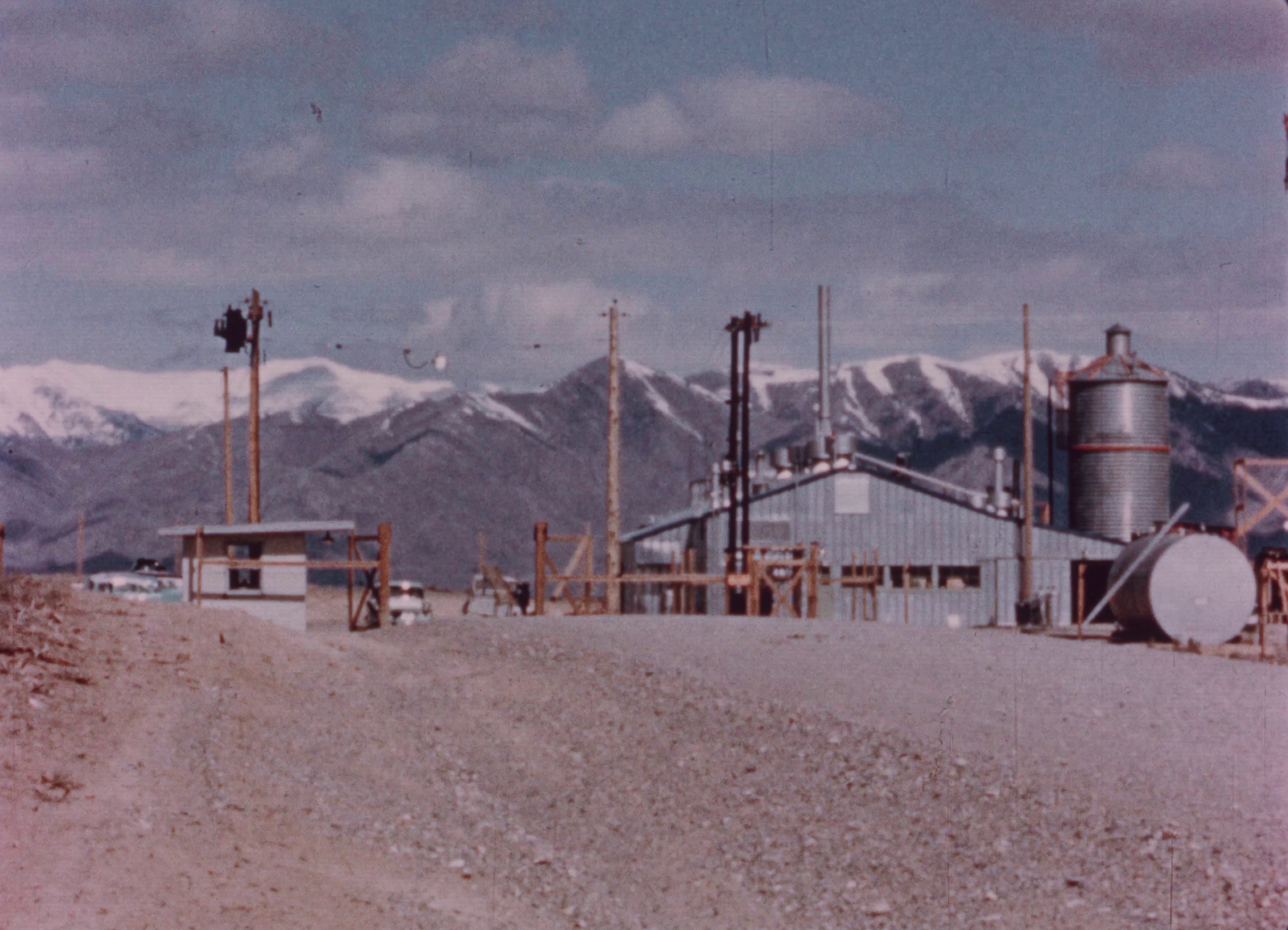
- Country: United States
- Coordinates: 43°31′16″N 112°53′44″W
- Status: Decommissioned
- Construction began: 17 June 1956
- Commission date: 1 February 1958
- Decommission date: 30 June 1963
- Owner: AEC

Nuclear power station
- Reactor supplier: Atomics International
- Cooling source: Liquid

Power generation
- Nameplate capacity: 16 MW

The Organic Moderated Reactor Experiment (OMRE) was a 16 MWt experimental organic nuclear reactor that operated at the National Reactor Testing Station from 1957 to 1963 to explore the use of hydrocarbons as coolant, moderator, and reflector materials in power reactor conditions. Such organic fluids are non-corrosive, do not become highly activated under irradiation, and can operate at low pressure and moderate temperature. These characteristics were considered promising towards the goal of achieving economical commercial nuclear power.

The information provided by OMRE established the credibility of the Organic nuclear reactor concept and led to the commercial demonstration at the Piqua Nuclear Generating Station. More recently, OMRE has been cited as providing key input and motivation for modern designs of such systems, aiming to help improve performance of new and advanced nuclear power plants towards the goals of climate change mitigation.

== Design ==
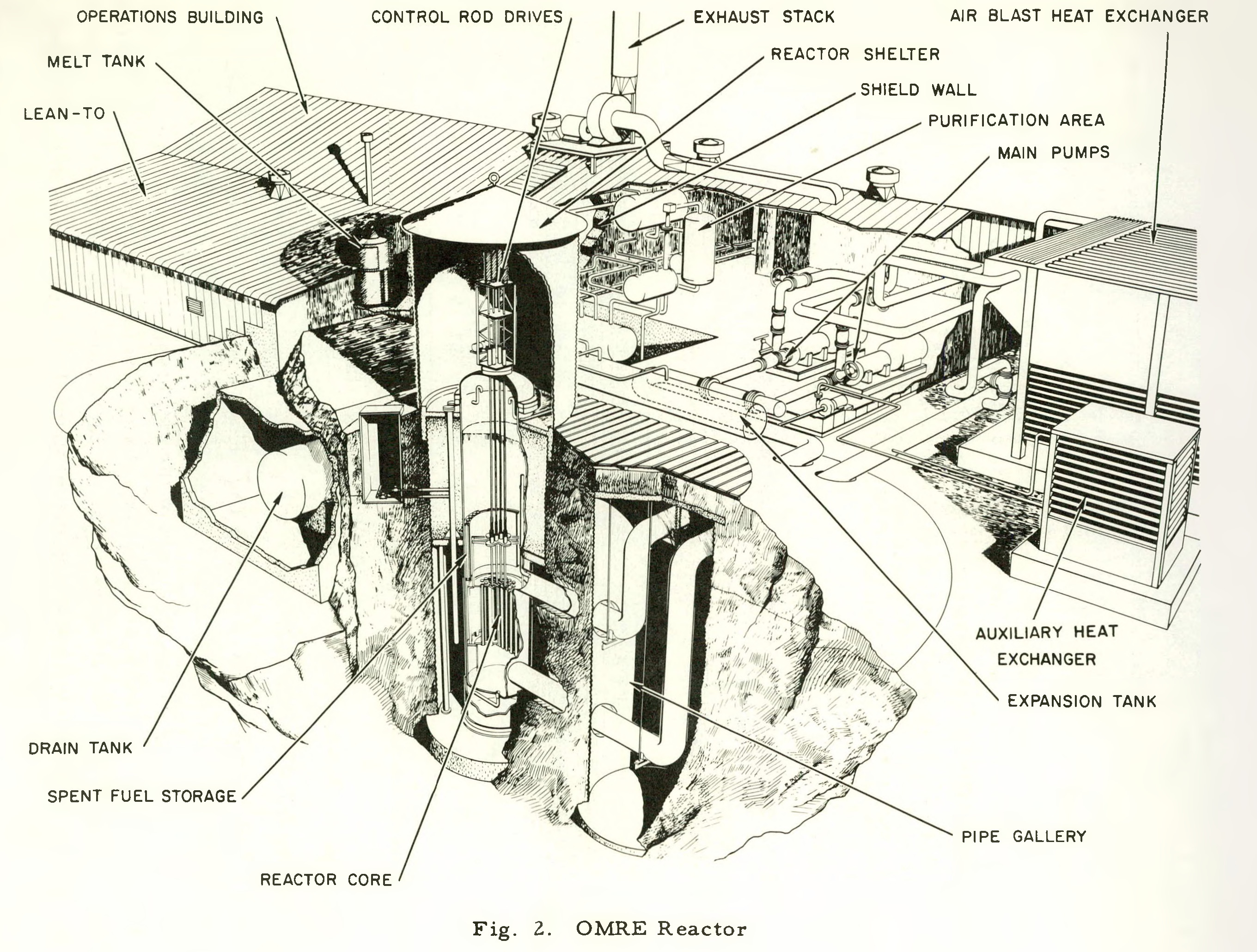
A labeled diagram of the Organic Moderated Reactor Experiment (OMRE)

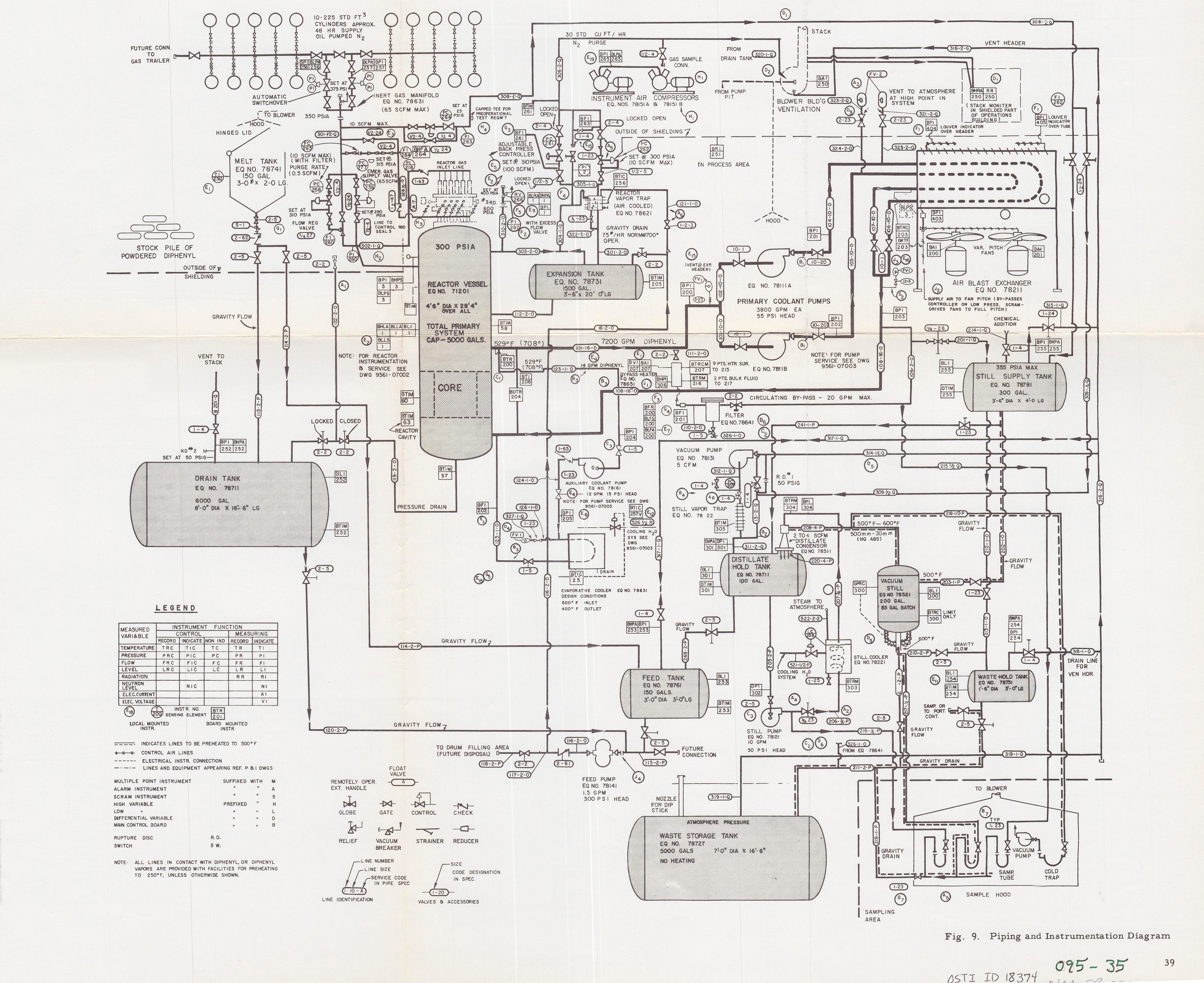
The piping and instrumentation diagram for the Organic Moderated Reactor Experiment (OMRE)

The OMRE design efforts began in July 1955. It was originally intended to operate for 1 year.

The objectives of the OMRE program were to obtain the following experimental information:

1. Rate of radiation and thermal neutron damage to the hydrocarbon in the reactor
2. Effect of this damage upon the operation of the reactor
3. Suitable methods for ensuring satisfactory reactor operation in the presence of damaged hydrocarbon

It was neither a pilot plant nor a prototype, but rather a minimum-cost experimental facility designed to investigate the feasibility of the organic concept to power reactors. It did not have an electric power conversion system.

OMRE was designed to provide operational information on the response of diphenyl to high nuclear radiation and thermal neutron flux, with flexibility to test other polyphenyls such as terphenyl.

The design criteria stated included:

1. Maximum fuel surface temperature between 750 °F (400 °C) and 800 °F (430 °C)
2. Bulk coolant temperature between 500 °F (260 °C) and 700 °F (370 °C)
3. Coolant velocity in fuel plates up to 15 ft/s (4.6 m/s)
4. Heat rejection capacity of 16 MWt
5. 25 fuel elements representing a total of 20.6 kg U^{235}
6. Fuel burnup of 11.2% U^{235}
7. Average thermal neutron flux in fuel of 2 10^{13} n/cm^{2}/s at 500 °F (260 °C)
8. Reactor system pressure of 300 psi (21 bar)

The fuel element was a stainless steel box in which 16 active fuel plates were held in longitudinal grooves. Each fuel plate consisted of a core of highly enriched uranium particles uniformly dispersed in a stainless-steel matrix, clad with 304 stainless steel and rolled into a 0.030 in (0.76 mm) thick, 2.760 in (70 mm) wide and 37 in (940 mm) fuel plate. The dimensions of the rectangular reactor core were 57 centimeters by 69 centimeters by 91 centimeters.

The reactor vessel was filled with diphenyl to obtain 14 feet of radiation shielding above the reactor core at 250 °F (120 °C). It was pressurized up to 300 psi with the inert nitrogen pressurized to 200 psi (14 bar) to prevent boiling of the hydrocarbon. The nitrogen was continuously purged from the system to sweep out any hydrogen and light hydrocarbon gases, like methane or ethane, produced by the decomposition of the coolant-moderator due to pyrolysis and radiolysis and discharge it out the stack.

Coolant was pumped at 7,200 US gal/min (27 cubic metres per minute) through an air-blast heat exchanger to dump the core heat to the atmosphere. A steam system and power conversion system were not used to simplify the construction and operation of the reactor experiment.

At high temperature and under irradiation, the hydrocarbons decompose and form longer chains with increasing molecular weight. This gradually degrades the heat transfer and flow characteristics of the fluid. To mitigate this, a coolant-moderator purification ran continuously to remove any hydrocarbons that had been damaged by heat or radiation. This was accomplished with a low-pressure distillation system.

All systems were constructed with carbon steel, except the reactor vessel. All systems had heaters (including induction heating, resistance heating, and an oil-fired heater on the air-blast heat exchangers) to bring the system above the melting temperature of the coolant-moderator.

== Construction ==
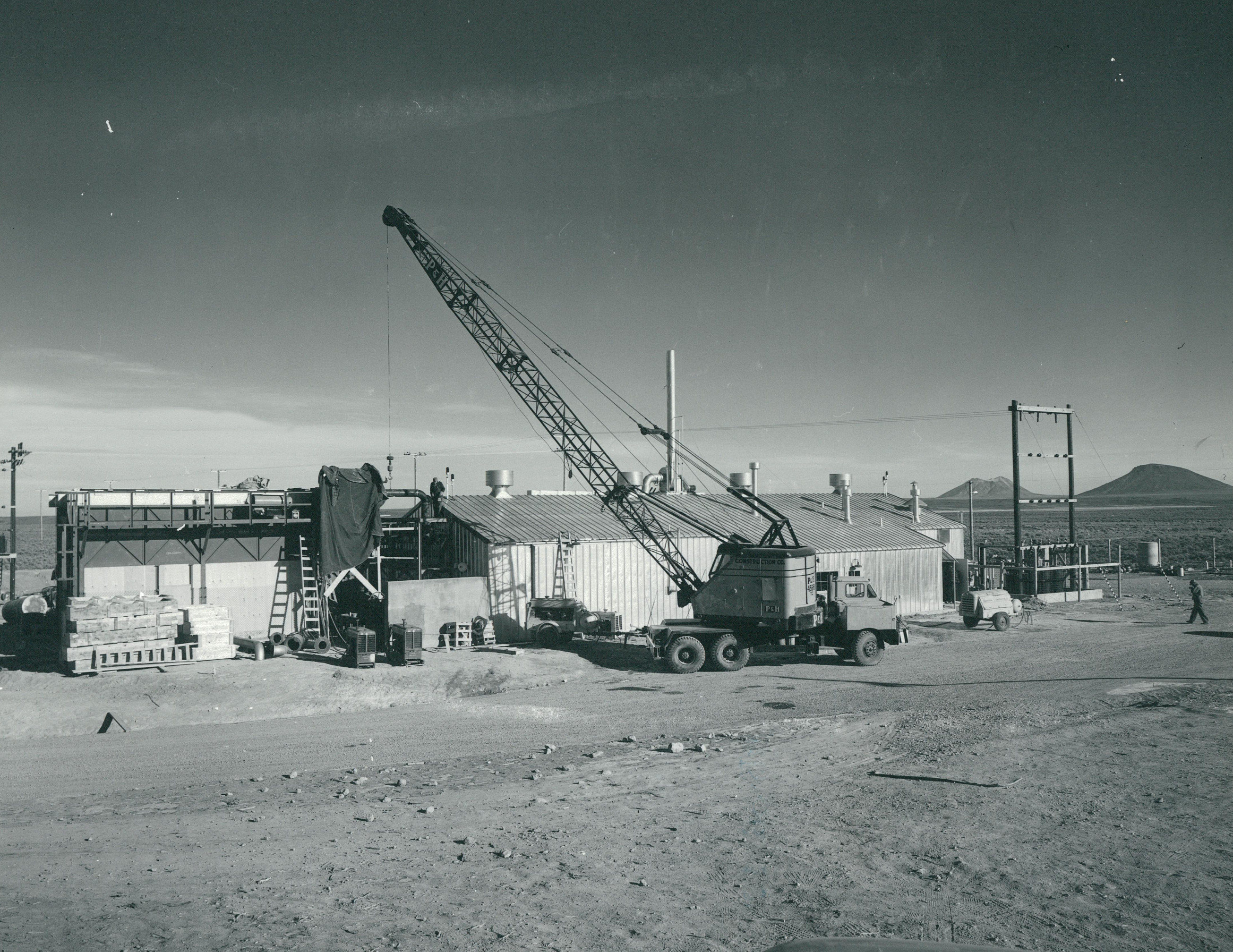
Construction of buildings and utilities at OMRE, view looking northeast of control building showing heat exchanger, main substation to the right

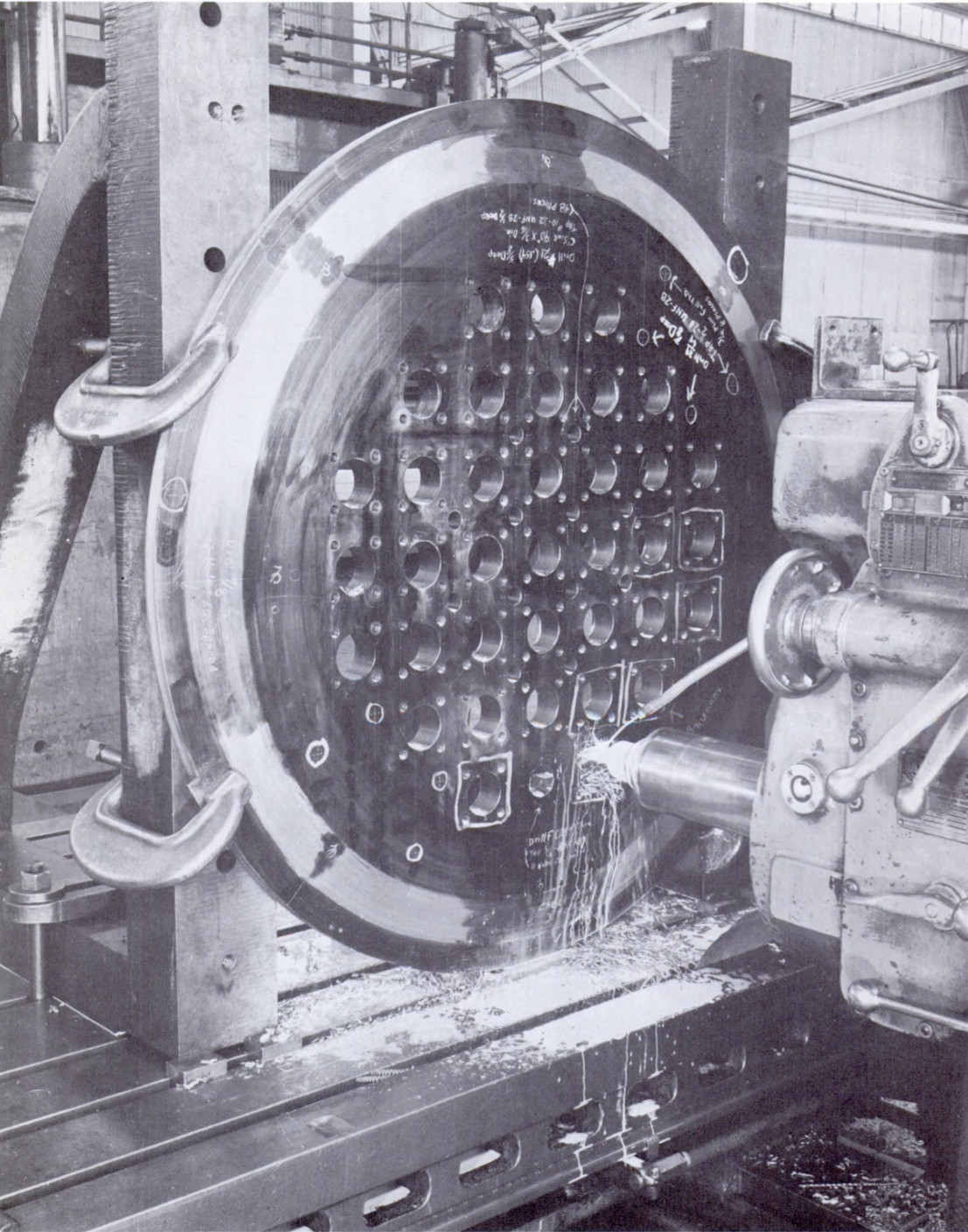
Organic Moderated Reactor Experiment Grid Plate Fabrication

Construction of OMRE began on June 17, 1956, and completed in May 1957. The reactor containment was partially built underground and consisted of a concrete pad and corrugated steel cylinder surrounded by compacted earth for radiation shielding.

Clearing, grading, roads, walks, drainage, water supply, power substation, sanitary and process waste systems, fencing, security lighting, guard station, communications system, control and processing building, and reactor foundation excavation were performed in Phase I of the construction by the Idaho Operations Office and the Atomic Energy Commission. Some delays were encountered due to appropriations delays and a steel strike.

The biggest setback was unsatisfactory performance of the control-rod drive mechanism. During testing, it became apparent that the original design would not work, and a new approach was needed.

Process piping was constructed of Schedule 40 carbon steel.

The buildings and utilities were constructed by Wadsworth & Arrington.

== Operation ==
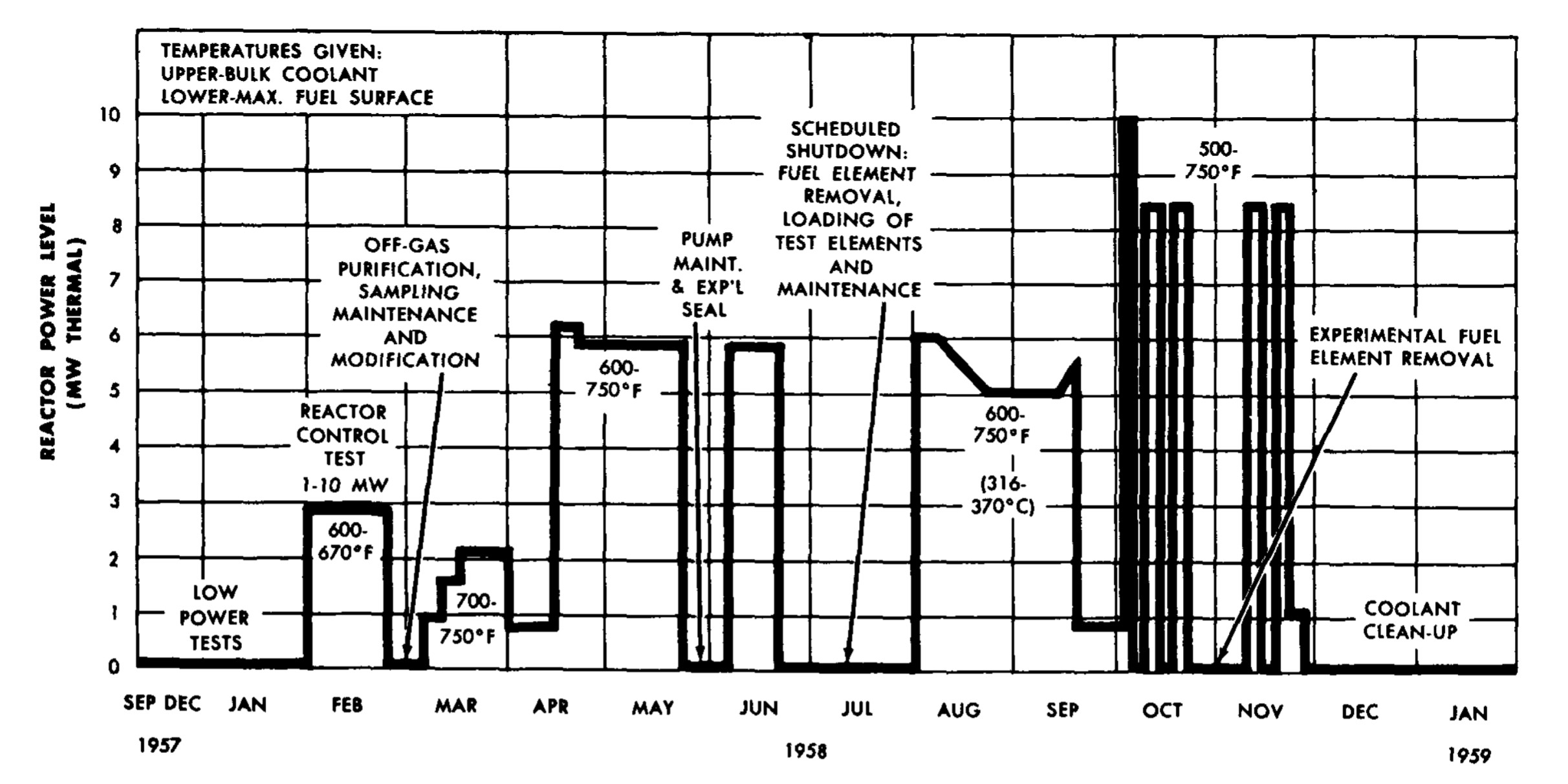
Initial operational history of the Organic Moderated Reactor Experiment (OMRE)

The OMRE first achieved criticality on September 17, 1957, and reached full power at the beginning of February, 1958. The reactor operated in two modes: without the purification system, and with the purification system. Seventeen tests were run with the first OMRE core throughout 1958 with reactor power between 0 and 12 MWt.

The first three tests were system check-out tests, covering all major systems. Subsequent tests simulated the conditions expected to be encountered in the Piqua Nuclear Generating Station. Test 4 demonstrated that pyrolitic decomposition rate in external piping was negligible. Tests 5-11 measured the decomposition rate and the effect of radiation damage on coolant-moderator heat-transfer characteristics. Tests 12 and 13 tested the purification system's ability to reduce the concentration of inorganic particulate matter while also reducing the high-boiler concentration from 40% to 8%.

Three fuel element failures occurred during first core operation. Two occurred in experimental low-enriched assemblies with finned aluminum cladding due to inadequate coolant filtration, and the third was caused by improper element seating.

By the end of the first year, the core had generated 958 MW-day of energy and been in operation for 5,600 hours. An extended shutdown followed to replace the core.

Problems with coolant purification complicated the operation of the OMRE reactor. The polymerization of the terphenyl coolant (Santowax OM, subsequently Santowax R) lead to fouling and blockage of coolant channels and to the installation of an on-line coolant purification system. These complications and the progress of the water-cooled nuclear reactor technology led to the decision of US Atomic Energy Commission to reduce the American organic nuclear reactor program on December 10, 1962, and ultimately to shutdown OMRE on June 30, 1963. The Experimental Organic Cooled Reactor (EOCR) was built next to OMRE in anticipation of further development of the concept. During the final stages of its construction, EOCR was also placed in standby and never operated.

== Decommissioning ==
Immediately following final OMRE shutdown, the nuclear fuel and reactor vessel internals were removed, and the organic coolant Santowax R (a commercial name of a mixture of terphenyl and diphenyl isomers) was drained from all the systems and remained in this deactivated condition until 1977.

The facility was eventually decontaminated and decommissioned between October 1977 and September 1979. The process was complicated by the existence of some remaining toxic and flammable Santowax-R and xylene, a neutron-activated radioactive vessel emitting 350 R/h, and asbestos insulation. Furthermore, due to insufficient neutron shielding being included in the design, "an extraordinary, unexpected amount of activated rock and soil was removed.

The surface radiation of the excavation and backfill material was brought to 20 R/h or less, and the nuclide content of the backfill soil was brought below 0.5 pCi/g.

The decommissioning effort was initially estimated in 1977 to cost $700,000 (equivalent to $3,600,000 in 2024) and take 2 years, and was completed on time and under budget, for a total cost of $500,000 (equivalent to $2,600,000 in 2024).
