= Irradiation =

Exposure of objects or people to radiation

Irradiation is the process by which an object is exposed to radiation. An irradiator is a device used to expose an object to radiation, most often gamma radiation, for a variety of purposes. Irradiators may be used for sterilizing medical and pharmaceutical supplies, preserving foodstuffs, alteration of gemstone colors, studying radiation effects, eradicating insects through sterile male release programs, or calibrating thermoluminescent dosimeters (TLDs).

The exposure can originate from various sources, including natural sources. Most frequently the term refers to ionizing radiation, and to a level of radiation that will serve a specific purpose, rather than radiation exposure to normal levels of background radiation. The term irradiation usually excludes the exposure to non-ionizing radiation, such as infrared, visible light, microwaves from cellular phones or electromagnetic waves emitted by radio and television receivers and power supplies.

== Applications ==
=== Sterilization ===
If administered at appropriate levels, all forms of ionizing radiation can sterilize objects, including medical instruments, disposables such as syringes, and food. Ionizing radiation (electron beams, X-rays and gamma rays) may be used to kill bacteria in food or other organic material, including blood. Food irradiation, while effective, is seldom used due to lack of public acceptance.

=== Medicine ===
Irradiation is used in diagnostic imaging, cancer therapy and blood transfusion.

In 2011 researchers found that irradiation was successful in the novel theranostic technique involving co-treatment with heptamethine dyes to elucidate tumor cells and attenuate their growth with minimal side effects.

=== Ion implantation ===
Ion irradiation is routinely used to implant impurities atoms into materials, especially semiconductors, to modify their properties. This process, usually known as ion implantation, is an important step in the manufacture of silicon integrated circuits.

=== Ion irradiation ===
Ion irradiation means in general using particle accelerators to shoot energetic ions on a material. Ion implantation is a variety of ion irradiation, as is swift heavy ions irradiation from particle accelerators induces ion tracks that can be used for nanotechnology.

=== Industrial chemistry ===
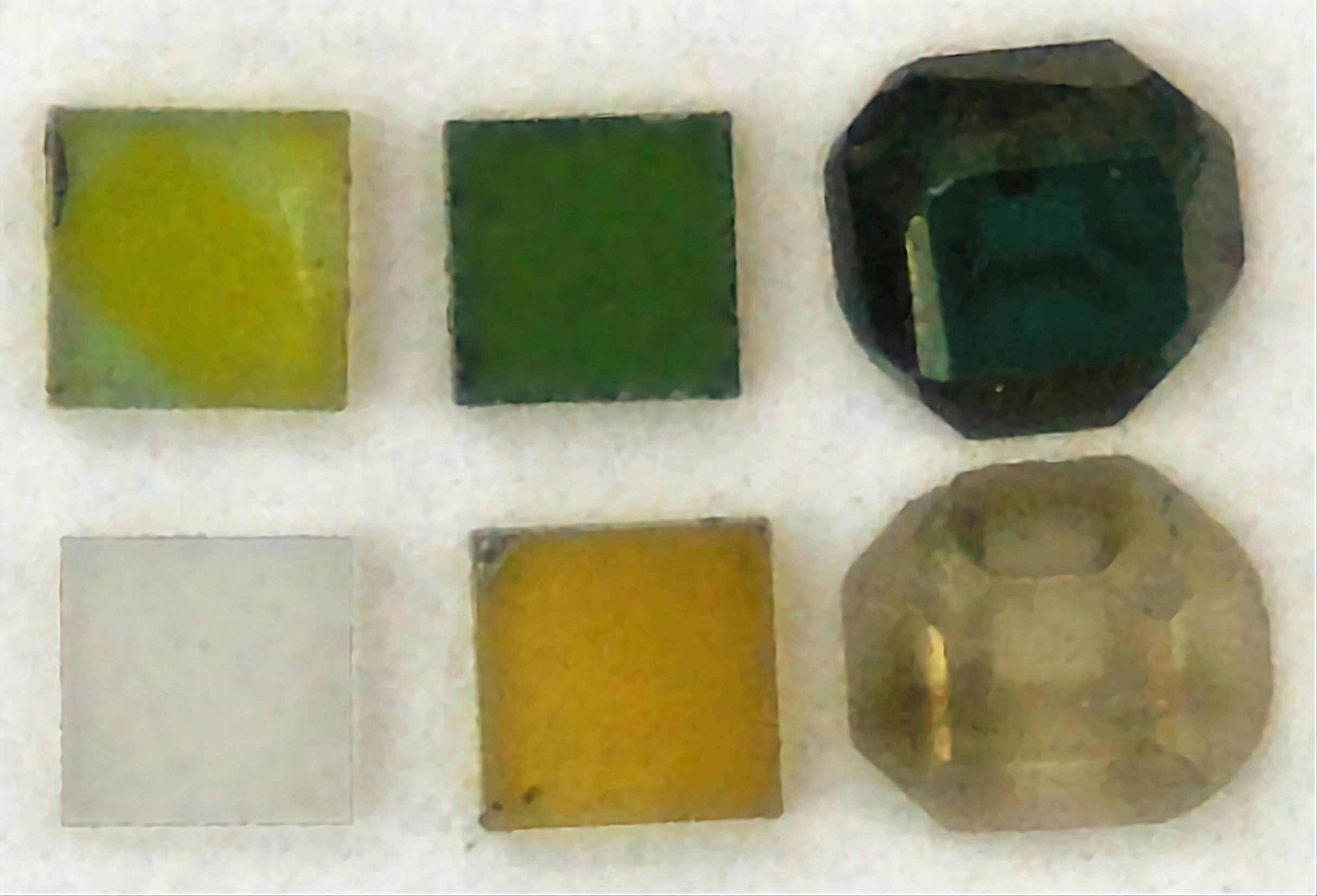
Pure diamonds, before and after irradiation treatment
A Initial (2×2 mm size)
B Irradiated by different doses of 2 MeV electrons
C Irradiated by different doses and then annealed at 800 °C (1,470 °F)

The irradiation process is widely practiced in jewelry industry and enabled the creation of gemstone colors that do not exist or are extremely rare in nature. However, particularly when done in a nuclear reactor, the processes can make gemstones radioactive. Health risks related to the residual radioactivity of the treated gemstones have led to government regulations in many countries.

Irradiation is used to cross-link plastics. Due to its efficiency, electron beam processing is often used in the irradiation treatment of polymer-based products to improve their mechanical, thermal, and chemical properties, and often to add unique properties. Cross-linked polyethylene pipe (PEX), high-temperature products such as tubing and gaskets, wire and cable jacket curing, curing of composite materials, and crosslinking of tires are a few examples.

=== Agriculture ===
After its discovery by Lewis Stadler at the University of Missouri, irradiation of seed and plant germplasm has resulted in creating many widely-grown cultivars of food crops worldwide. The process, which consists of striking plant seeds or germplasm with radiation in the form of X-rays, UV waves, heavy-ion beams, or gamma rays, essentially induce lesions of the DNA, leading to mutations in the genome. The UN has been an active participant through the International Atomic Energy Agency. Irradiation is also employed to prevent the sprouting of certain cereals, onions, potatoes and garlic. Appropriate irradiation doses are also used to produce insects for use in the sterile insect technique of pest control.

The U.S. Department of Agriculture's (USDA) Food Safety and Inspection Service (FSIS) recognizes irradiation as an important technology to protect consumers. Fresh meat and poultry including whole or cut up birds, skinless poultry, pork chops, roasts, stew meat, liver, hamburgers, ground meat, and ground poultry are approved for irradiation.

=== Assassination ===
Gheorghe Gheorghiu-Dej, who died of lung cancer in Bucharest on March 19, 1965, may have been intentionally irradiated during a visit to Moscow, due to his political stance.

In 1999, an article in Der Spiegel alleged that the East German MfS intentionally irradiated political prisoners with high-dose radiation, possibly to provoke cancer.

Alexander Litvinenko, a secret serviceman who was tackling organized crime in Russia, was intentionally poisoned with polonium-210; the very large internal doses of radiation he received caused his death.

=== Nuclear industry ===
In the nuclear industry, irradiation may refer to the phenomenon of exposure of the structure of a nuclear reactor to neutron flux, making the material radioactive and causing irradiation embrittlement, or irradiation of the nuclear fuel.

=== Security ===
During the 2001 anthrax attacks, the US Postal Service irradiated mail to protect members of the US government and other possible targets. This was of some concern to people who send digital media through the mail, including artists. According to the ART in Embassies program, "incoming mail is irradiated, and the process destroys slides, transparencies and disks."

== See also ==
- Dose area product
- Radiolysis
