= Terphenyl =

para-Terphenyl
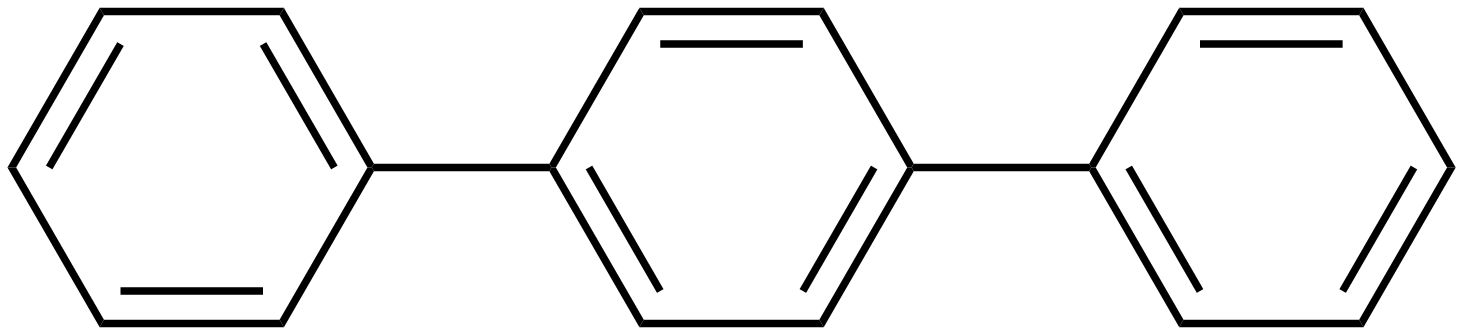
- Skeletal formula of para-terphenyl

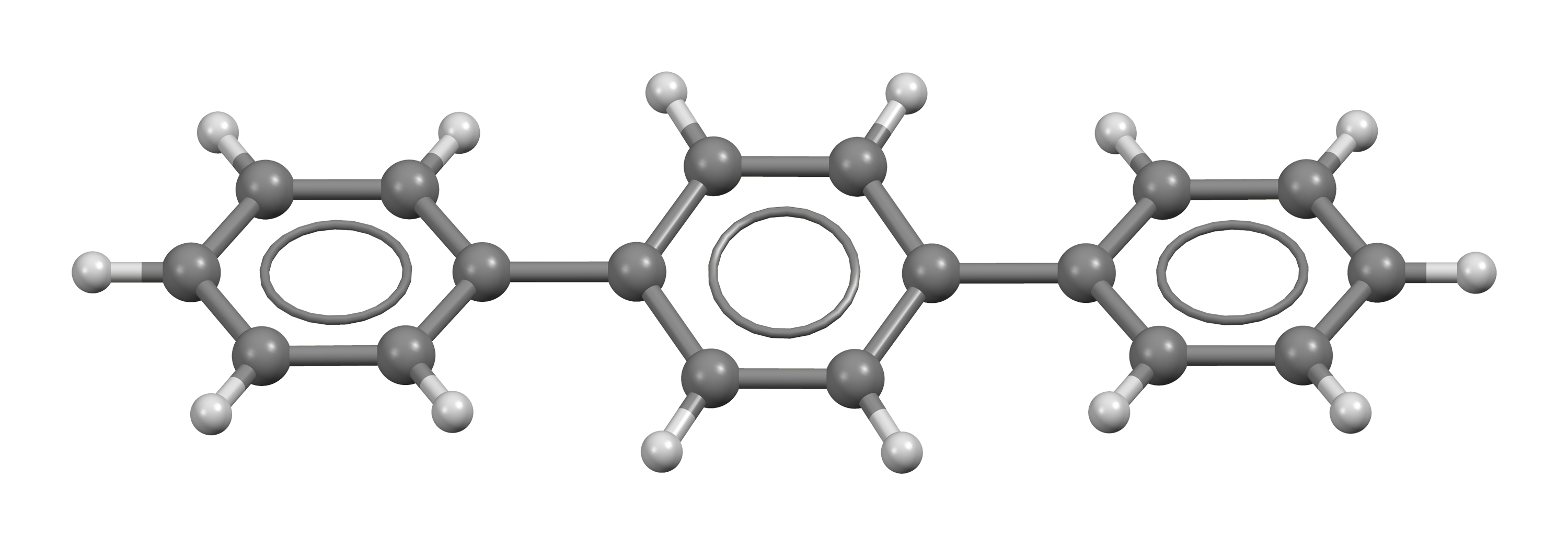
- Ball-and-stick model of para-terphenyl

Names
- Preferred IUPAC name 1^{1},2^{1}:2^{4},3^{1}-Terphenyl
- Other names 1,1′:4′,1″-Terphenyl p-Terphenyl; 1,4-Diphenylbenzene para-Diphenylbenzene p-Diphenylbenzene para-Triphenyl p-Triphenyl

Identifiers
CAS Number	92-94-4 (para); 92-06-8 (meta); 84-15-1 (ortho); 26140-60-3 (unspecified)
3D model (JSmol)	Interactive image; (para): Interactive image
Beilstein Reference	1908447
ChEBI	CHEBI:52242
ChEMBL	ChEMBL491582
ChemSpider	6848 (para)
ECHA InfoCard	100.043.146
EC Number	202-205-2
PubChem CID	7115
RTECS number	WZ6475000
UNII	GWP218ZY6F (para); WOI2PSS0KX (meta); W5675R7KVW (ortho); LFX1C55D2Z (unspecified)
CompTox Dashboard (EPA)	DTXSID2027888
- InChI: InChI=1S/C18H14/c1-3-7-15(8-4-1)17-11-13-18(14-12-17)16-9-5-2-6-10-16/h1-14H Key: XJKSTNDFUHDPQJ-UHFFFAOYSA-N; (para): InChI=1/C18H14/c1-3-7-15(8-4-1)17-11-13-18(14-12-17)16-9-5-2-6-10-16/h1-14H Key: XJKSTNDFUHDPQJ-UHFFFAOYAJ
- SMILES: C1=CC=C(C=C1)C2=CC=C(C=C2)C3=CC=CC=C3; (para): c1ccc(cc1)c2ccc(cc2)c3ccccc3

Properties
Chemical formula	C_{18}H_{14}
Molar mass	230.310 g·mol^{−1}
Appearance	White powder
Density	1.24 g/cm^{3}
Melting point	212 to 214 °C (414 to 417 °F; 485 to 487 K); 212-213 °C
Boiling point	389 °C (732 °F; 662 K)
Solubility in water	Insoluble
Refractive index (n_{D})	1.65

Hazards
- GHS labelling
Pictograms	(GHS07: Exclamation mark) (GHS09: Environmental hazard)
Signal word	Warning
Hazard statements	H315, H319, H335, H400
Precautionary statements	P261, P264, P271, P273, P280, P302+P352, P304+P340, P305+P351+P338, P312, P321, P332+P313, P337+P313, P362, P391, P403+P233, P405, P501
NFPA 704 (fire diamond)	2 1 0
Flash point	207 °C (405 °F; 480 K)
- NIOSH (US health exposure limits)
PEL (Permissible)	C 9 mg/m^{3} (1 ppm)
- Except where otherwise noted, data are given for materials in their standard state (at 25 °C [77 °F], 100 kPa). verify (what is ?) Infobox references

Terphenyls are a group of aromatic hydrocarbons. Also known as diphenylbenzenes or triphenyls, they consist of a central benzene ring substituted with two phenyl groups. There are three substitution patterns: ortho-terphenyl, meta-terphenyl, and para-terphenyl. Commercial grade terphenyl is generally a mixture of the three isomers. This mixture is used in the production of polychlorinated terphenyls, which were formerly used as heat storage and transfer agents.

== Occurrence ==
p-Terphenyl derivatives are found in various fungi and bacteria. One example is atromentin, a pigment found in some mushrooms. These natural p-terphenyls are better described as diphenylquinones or diphenylhydroquinones. Some m-terphenyl compounds occur in plants.

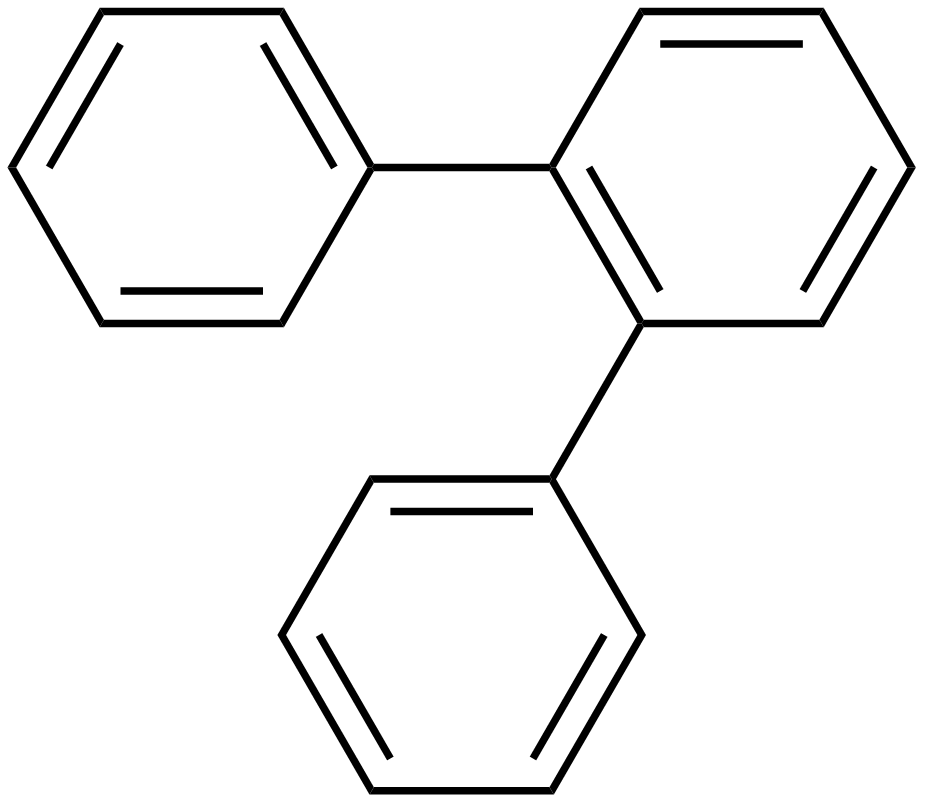
ortho-Terphenyl

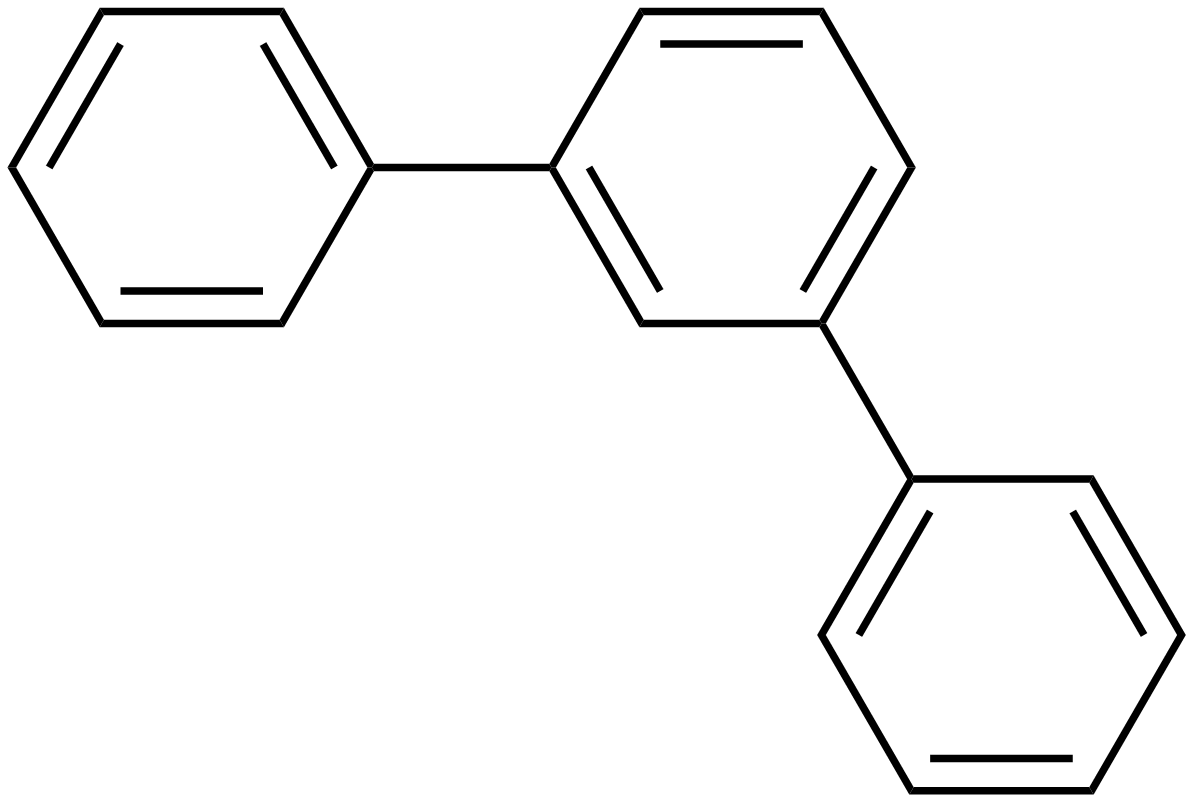
meta-Terphenyl

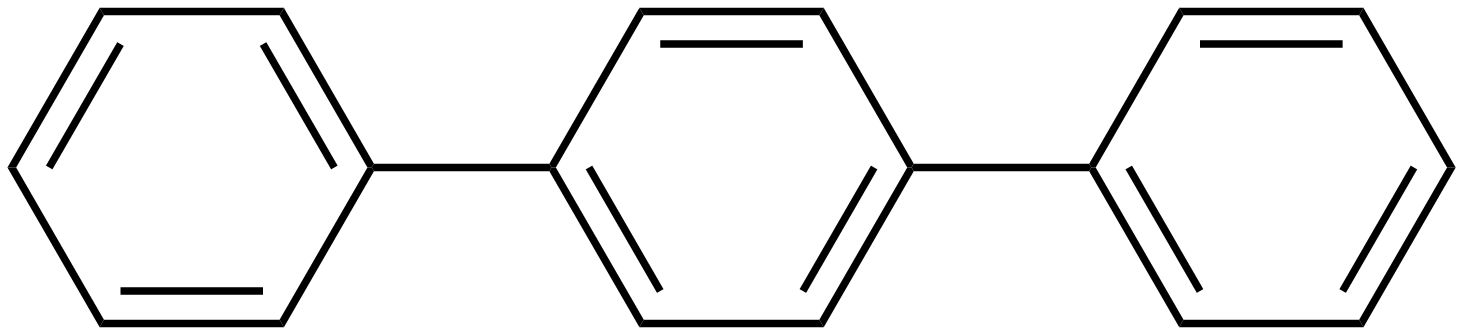
para-Terphenyl

== See also ==
- Biphenyl
- Terpyridine
- Terthiophene
- Triphenylene
- OMRE, experimental organic nuclear reactor that tested terphenyl as reactor coolant
