= Neutron embrittlement =

Neutron embrittlement, sometimes more broadly radiation embrittlement, is the embrittlement of various materials due to the action of neutrons. This is primarily seen in nuclear reactors, where the release of high-energy neutrons causes the long-term degradation of the reactor materials. The embrittlement is caused by the microscopic movement of atoms that are hit by the neutrons; this same action also gives rise to neutron-induced swelling causing materials to grow in size, and the Wigner effect causing energy buildup in certain materials that can lead to sudden releases of energy.

Neutron embrittlement mechanisms include:

- Hardening and dislocation pinning due to nanometer features created by irradiation
- Generation of lattice defects in collision cascades via the high-energy recoil atoms produced in the process of neutron scattering.
- Diffusion of major defects, which leads to higher amounts of solute diffusion, as well as formation of nanoscale defect-solute cluster complexes, solute clusters, and distinct phases.

== Embrittlement in Nuclear Reactors ==
Neutron irradiation embrittlement limits the service life of reactor-pressure vessels (RPV) in nuclear power plants due to the degradation of reactor materials. In order to perform at high efficiency and safely contain coolant water at temperatures around 290°C and pressures of ~7 MPa (for boiling water reactors) to 14 MPa (for pressurized water reactors), the RPV must be heavy-section steel. Due to regulations, RPV failure probabilities must be very low. To achieve sufficient safety, the design of the reactor assumes large cracks and extreme loading conditions. Under such conditions, a probable failure mode is rapid, catastrophic fracture if the vessel steel is brittle. Tough RPV base metals that are typically used are A302B, A533B plates, or A508 forgings; these are quenched and tempered, low-alloy steels with primarily tempered bainitic microstructures. Over the past few decades, RPV embrittlement has been addressed by the use of tougher steels with lower trace impurity contents, the decrease of neutron flux that the vessel is subject to, and the elimination of beltline welds. However, embrittlement remains an issue for older reactors.

Pressurized water reactors are more susceptible to embrittlement than boiling water reactors. This is due to PWRs sustaining more neutron impacts. To counteract this, many PWRs have a specific core design that reduces the number of neutrons hitting the vessel wall. Moreover, PWR designs must be especially mindful of embrittlement because of pressurized thermal shock, an accident scenario that occurs when cold water enters a pressurized reactor vessel, introducing large thermal stress. This thermal stress may cause fracture if the reactor vessel is sufficiently brittle.

== See also ==
- Radiation damage
