= Biphenyl =

- Skeletal formula

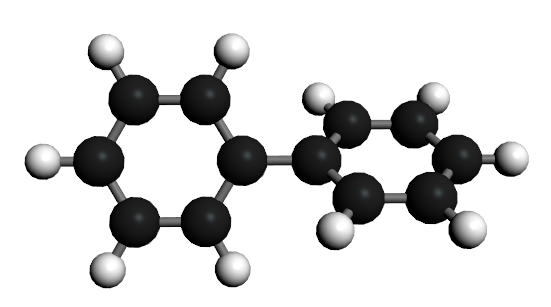
Ball and stick model of biphenyl. Created with MoleditPy program.
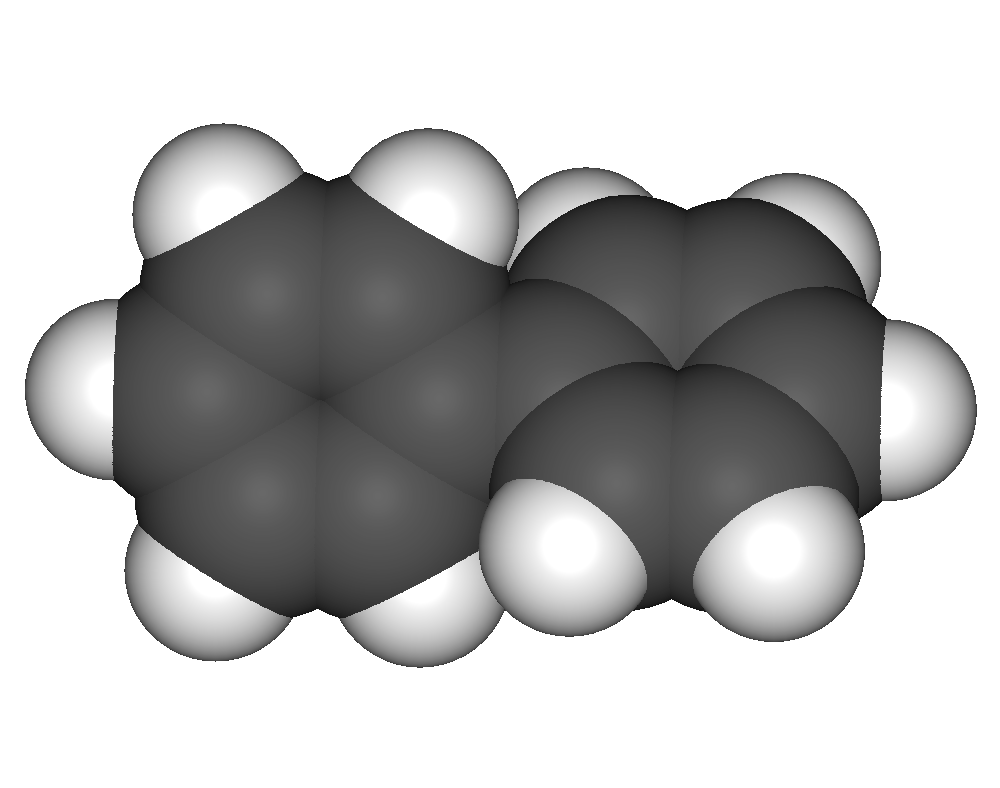
Space filling model showing its twisted conformation
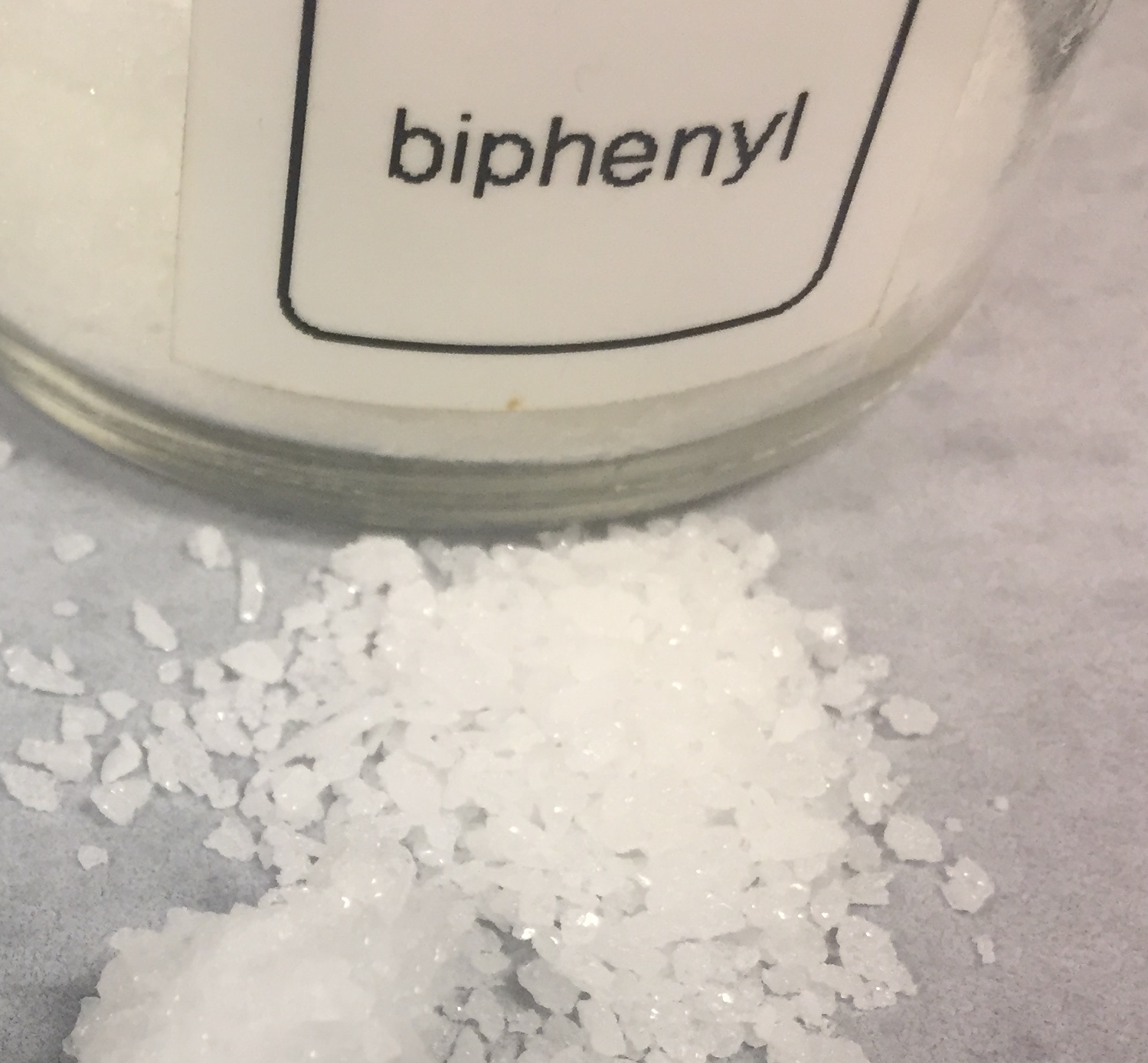
- Biphenyl sample

Names
- Preferred IUPAC name 1,1′-Biphenyl
- Other names: Biphenyl; Phenylbenzene; Xenene

Identifiers
CAS Number	92-52-4
3D model (JSmol)	Interactive image
Abbreviations	Ph_{2}
Beilstein Reference	1634058
ChEBI	CHEBI:17097
ChEMBL	ChEMBL14092
ChemSpider	6828
ECHA InfoCard	100.001.967
EC Number	202-163-5
E number	E230 (preservatives)
Gmelin Reference	3808
KEGG	C06588
PubChem CID	7095
RTECS number	DU8050000
UNII	2L9GJK6MGN
UN number	3077
CompTox Dashboard (EPA)	DTXSID4020161
- InChI: InChI=1S/C12H10/c1-3-7-11(8-4-1)12-9-5-2-6-10-12/h1-10H Key: ZUOUZKKEUPVFJK-UHFFFAOYSA-N; InChI=1/C12H10/c1-3-7-11(8-4-1)12-9-5-2-6-10-12/h1-10H Key: ZUOUZKKEUPVFJK-UHFFFAOYAV
- SMILES: c1ccccc1-c2ccccc2

Properties
Chemical formula	C_{12}H_{10}
Molar mass	154.212 g·mol^{−1}
Appearance	Colorless to pale-yellow crystals
Odor	pleasant
Density	1.04 g/cm^{3}
Melting point	69.2 °C (156.6 °F; 342.3 K)
Boiling point	255 °C (491 °F; 528 K)
Solubility in water	4.45 mg/L
Vapor pressure	0.005 mmHg (20°C)
Magnetic susceptibility (χ)	−103.25·10^{−6} cm^{3}/mol

Hazards
- GHS labelling
Pictograms	(GHS07: Exclamation mark) (GHS09: Environmental hazard)
Signal word	Warning
Hazard statements	H315, H319, H335, H410
Precautionary statements	P261, P264, P271, P273, P280, P302+P352, P304+P340, P305+P351+P338, P312, P321, P332+P313, P337+P313, P362, P391, P403+P233, P405, P501
NFPA 704 (fire diamond)	1 1 0
Flash point	113 °C (235 °F; 386 K)
Autoignition temperature	540 °C (1,004 °F; 813 K)
Explosive limits	0.6–5.8%
- Lethal dose or concentration (LD, LC)
LD_{50} (median dose)	2400 mg/kg (oral, rabbit); 3280 mg/kg (oral, rat); 1900 mg/kg (oral, mouse); 2400 mg/kg (oral, rat)
- NIOSH (US health exposure limits)
PEL (Permissible)	TWA 1 mg/m^{3} (0.2 ppm)
REL (Recommended)	TWA 1 mg/m^{3} (0.2 ppm)
IDLH (Immediate danger)	100 mg/m^{3}
- Except where otherwise noted, data are given for materials in their standard state (at 25 °C [77 °F], 100 kPa). verify (what is ?) Infobox references

Biphenyl (also known as diphenyl, phenylbenzene, 1,1′-biphenyl, lemonene or BP) is an organic compound that forms colorless crystals. Particularly in older literature, compounds containing the functional group consisting of biphenyl less one hydrogen (the site at which it is attached) may use the prefixes xenyl or diphenylyl.

It has a distinctively pleasant smell. Biphenyl is an aromatic hydrocarbon with a molecular formula (C_{6}H_{5})_{2}. It is notable as a starting material for the production of polychlorinated biphenyls (PCBs), which were once widely used as dielectric fluids and heat transfer agents.

Biphenyl is also an intermediate for the production of a host of other organic compounds such as emulsifiers, optical brighteners, crop protection products, and plastics. Biphenyl is insoluble in water, but soluble in typical organic solvents. The biphenyl molecule consists of two connected phenyl rings.

== Properties and occurrence ==
Biphenyl is a solid at room temperature, with a melting point of 69.2 °C (156.6 °F). In the gas phase the molecule exists in two enantiomorphic twisted forms with an angle between the planes of the two rings of 44.4(2)°. In the room-temperature solid, biphenyl is crystalline with space group P2_{1}/c, which does not allow for chiral crystals. In the first structure determination in the solid state the molecule was described as perfectly planar within the limits of error. The planar arrangement in the crystalline phase I is assumed to result from dynamic disorder, i.e. it represents an average of two twisted structures. The lower temperature solid phases II and III have been described as modulated structures with the biphenyl molecules being locked in one of the two non-planar conformations with torsion angles ranging from 9 to 21°. A study from 2021 concludes that in the crystalline phase at 100 K there is no double-well potential associated with the two twisted conformations, but the potential energy is minimized to zero twist. Relative to the free molecule it represents therefore a transition state of inversion stabilized by the intermolecular interactions in a molecular crystal.

Biphenyl occurs naturally in coal tar, crude oil, and natural gas and can be isolated from these sources via distillation. It is produced industrially as a byproduct of the dealkylation of toluene to produce methane:

C_{6}H_{5}CH_{3} + C_{6}H_{6} → C_{6}H_{5}−C_{6}H_{5} + CH_{4}

The other principal route is by the oxidative dehydrogenation of benzene:

2 C_{6}H_{6} + 1/2 O_{2} → C_{6}H_{5}−C_{6}H_{5} + H_{2}O

Annually 40,000,000 kg are produced by these routes.

In the laboratory, biphenyl can also be synthesized by treating phenylmagnesium bromide with copper(II) salts.

It can also be prepared using diazonium salts. When aniline is treated with NaNO_{2}+dilute HCl at 5 °C, it yields benzene diazonium chloride. When this is further reacted with benzene, biphenyl is formed. This is known as the Gomberg–Bachmann reaction.

$\ce{Ph-NH2->[\text{NaNO}_2\text{(aq), HCl}][T\;=\;273-278\;\mathrm{K}] Ph-N2+ ->[\text{Ph-H, Δ}] Ph-Ph}$

== Reactions and uses ==
Lacking functional groups, biphenyl is fairly non-reactive, which is the basis of its main application: in a eutectic mixture with diphenyl ether, as a heat transfer agent. This mixture is stable to 400 °C.

Biphenyl does undergo sulfonation which, followed by base hydrolysis, produces p-hydroxybiphenyl and p,p′-dihydroxybiphenyl, which are useful fungicides. In other substitution reactions, it undergoes halogenation. Polychlorinated biphenyls were once popular pesticides.

=== Li biphenyl radical ===
Lithium biphenyl contains the radical anion, which is highly reducing (−3.1 V vs Fc^{+/0}). Several solvates of alkali metal salts of biphenyl anion have been characterized by X-ray crystallography. These salts, usually prepared in situ, are versatile reducing agents. Lithium biphenyl offers some advantages relative to the related lithium naphthene. Related to Li/biphenyl is the derivative with tert-butyl groups on the biphenyl.

== Stereochemistry ==
Rotation about the single bond in biphenyl, and especially its ortho-substituted derivatives, is sterically hindered. For this reason, some substituted biphenyls show atropisomerism; that is, the individual C_{2}-symmetric-isomers are optically stable. Some derivatives, as well as related molecules such as BINAP, find application as ligands in asymmetric synthesis. In the case of unsubstituted biphenyl, the equilibrium torsional angle is 44.4° and the torsional barriers are quite small, 6.0 kJ/mol at 0° and 6.5 kJ/mol at 90°. Adding ortho substituents greatly increases the barrier: in the case of the 2,2'-dimethyl derivative, the barrier is 17.4 kcal/mol (72.8 kJ/mol).

== Biphenyl compounds ==
Substituted biphenyls have many uses. They are prepared by various coupling reactions including the Suzuki-Miyaura reaction and the Ullmann reaction. Polychlorinated biphenyls were once used as cooling and insulating fluids and polybrominated biphenyls are flame retardants. The biphenyl motif also appears in drugs such as diflunisal and telmisartan. The abbreviation E7 stands for a liquid crystal mixture consisting of several cyanobiphenyls with long aliphatic tails used commercially in liquid crystal displays (5CB, 7CB, 8OCB and 5CT). A variety of benzidine derivatives are used in dyes and polymers. Research into biphenyl liquid crystal candidates mainly focuses on molecules with highly polar heads (for example cyano or halide groups) and aliphatic tails. It is part of the active group in the antibiotic oritavancin.

== Safety and bioactivity ==
Biphenyl prevents the growth of molds and fungus, and is therefore used as a preservative (E230, in combination with E231, E232 and E233), particularly in the preservation of citrus fruits during transportation. It is no longer approved as a food additive in the European Union.

Biphenyl is mildly toxic, but can be degraded biologically by conversion into nontoxic compounds. Some bacteria are able to hydroxylate biphenyl and its polychlorinated biphenyls (PCBs).

== See also ==
- Naphthalene, where the rings are fused
- Terphenyl, three ringed analog
- Bithiophene
- Polypyrrole
- OMRE, experimental organic nuclear reactor that tested biphenyl as reactor coolant
