= Nuclear power plant =

Thermal power station where the heat source is a nuclear reactor

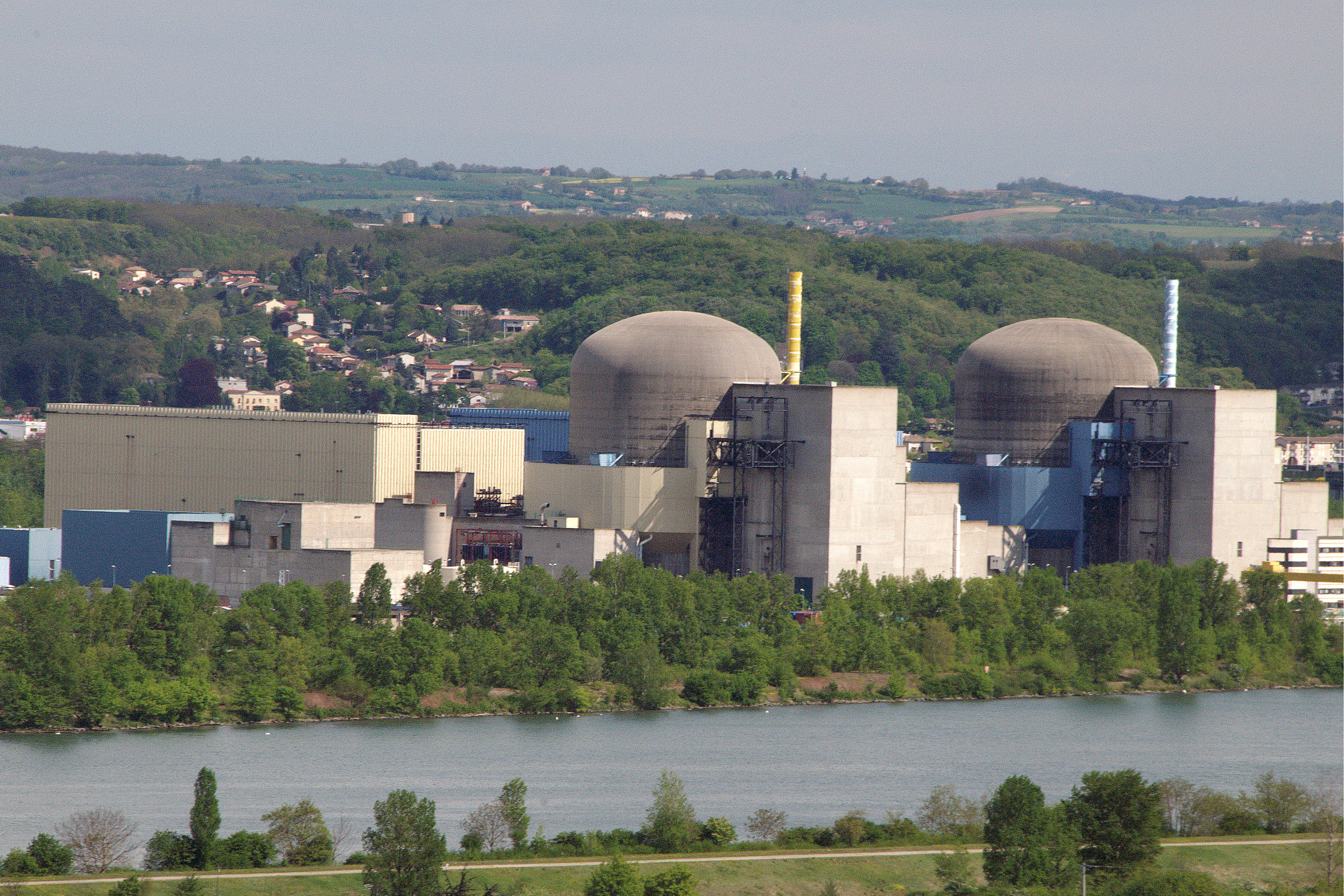
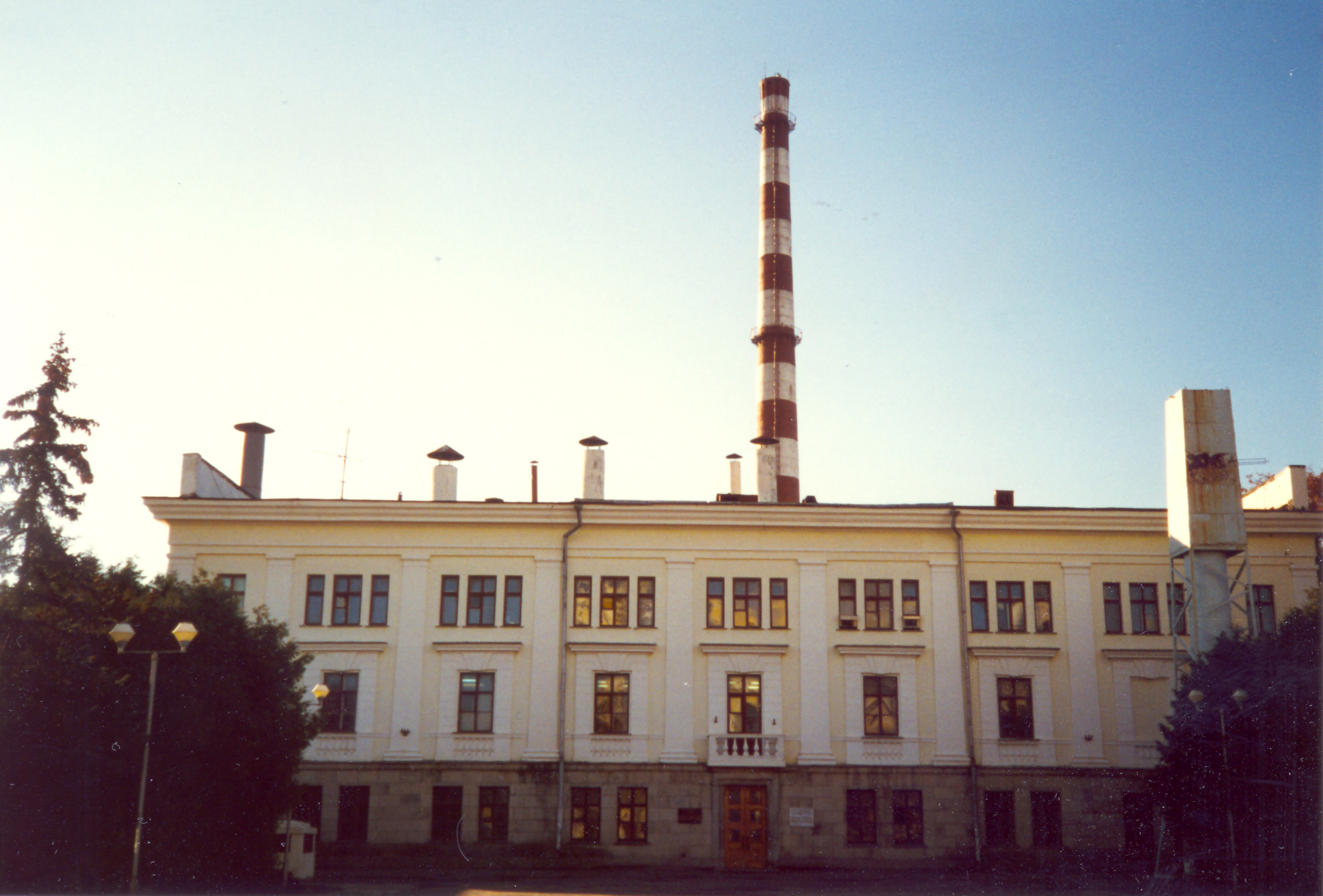
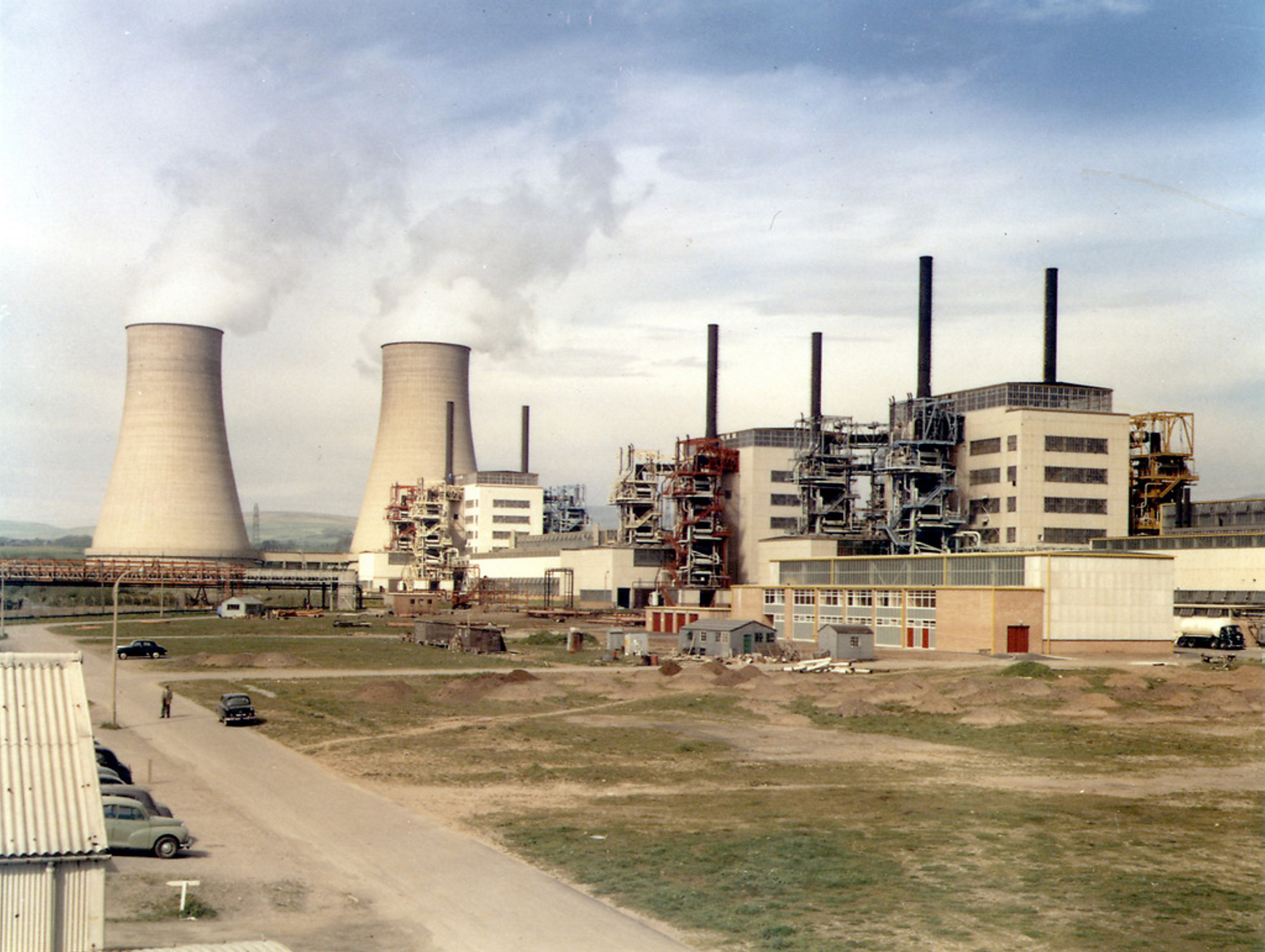
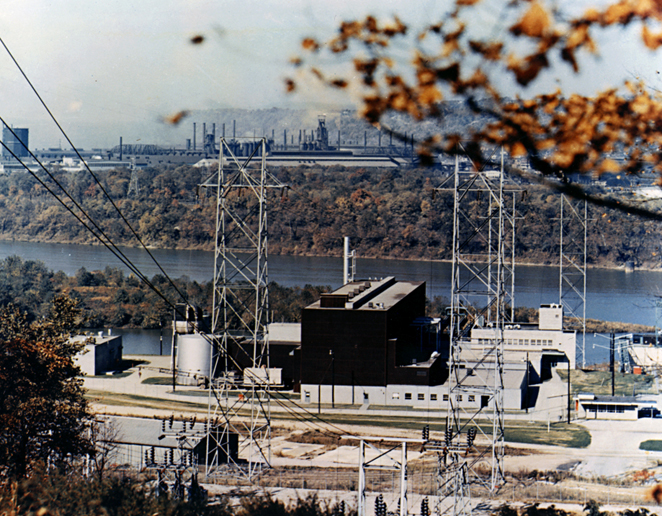
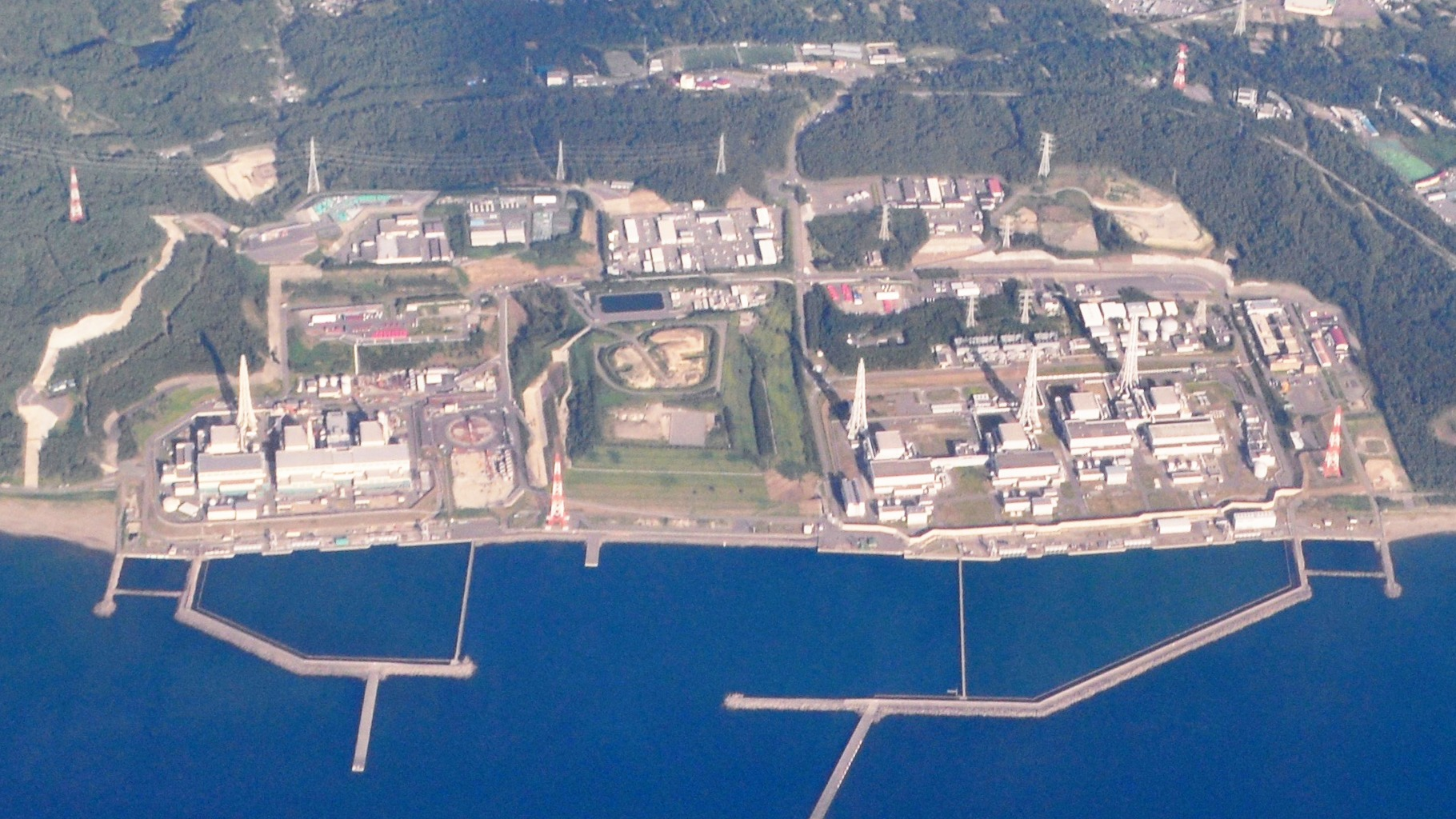
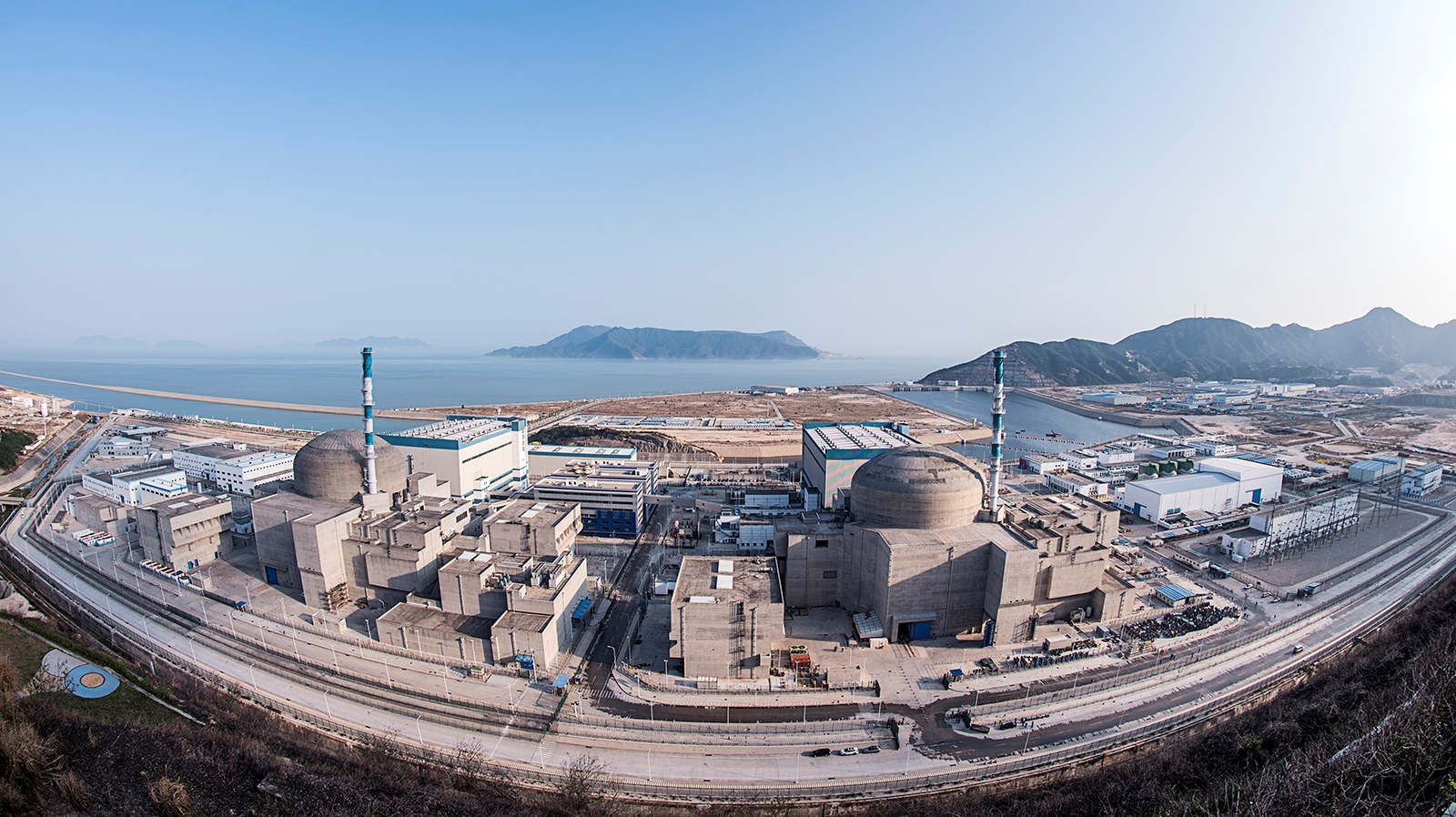
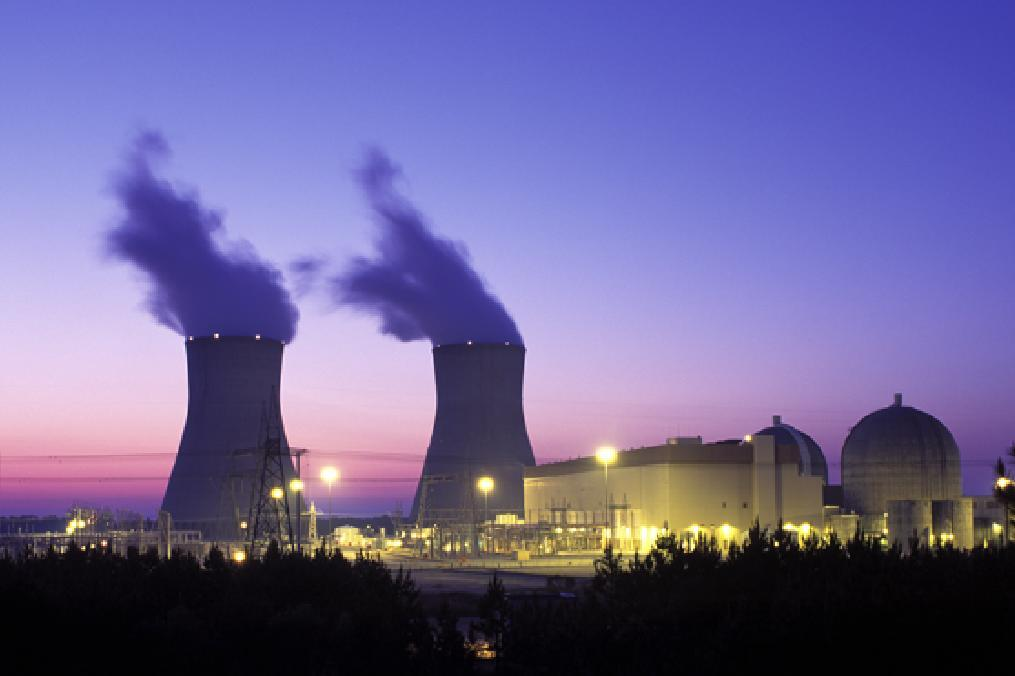
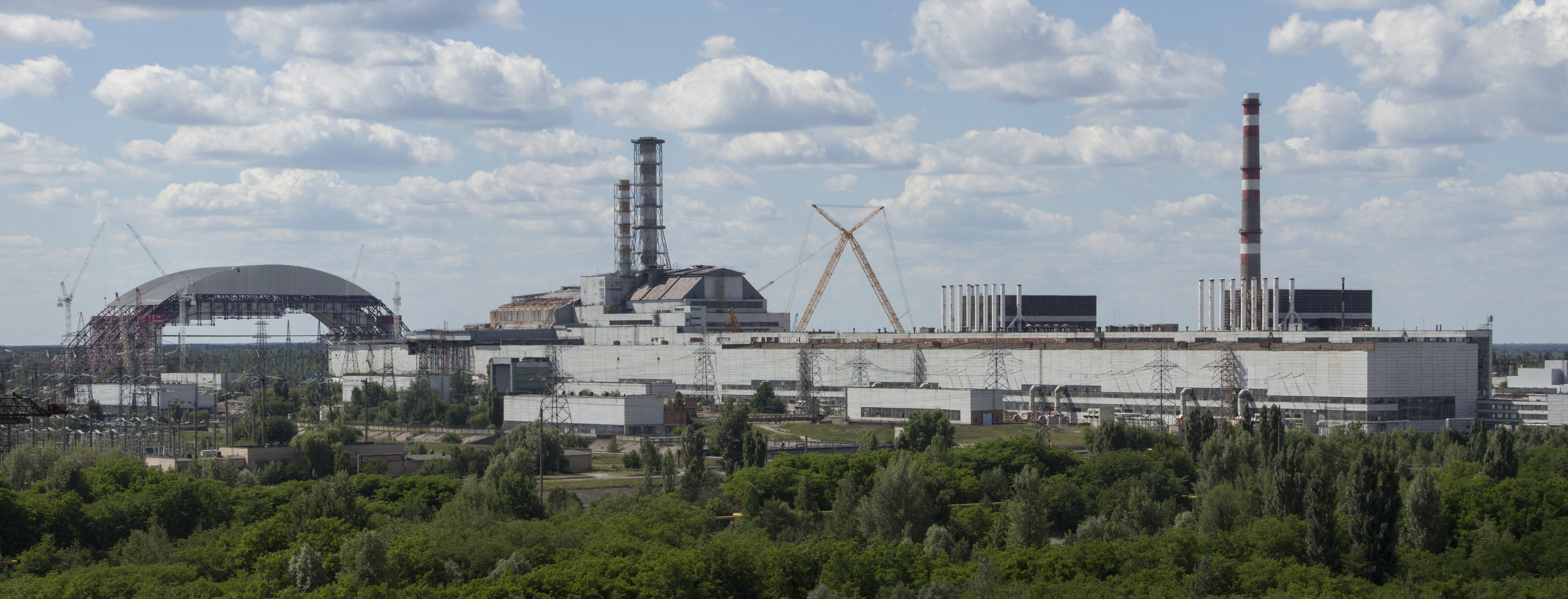
From top, left to right
1. Saint-Alban Nuclear Power Plant in France
2. Obninsk, the world's first nuclear power plant
3. Calder Hall, the first large-scale plant
4. Shippingport Atomic Power Station, the US' first plant
5. Kashiwazaki-Kariwa, formerly the world's largest plant
6. Taishan, containing the world's largest individual reactor cores
7. Vogtle, the only US plant with reactors built in the 21st century
8. The Chernobyl sarcophagus, built to contain the effects of the 1986 disaster

A nuclear power plant (NPP), also known as a nuclear power station (NPS), nuclear generating station (NGS) or atomic power station (APS) is a thermal power station in which the heat source is a nuclear reactor. As is typical of thermal power stations, heat is used to generate steam that drives a steam turbine connected to a generator that produces electricity. As of October 2025, the International Atomic Energy Agency reported that there were 416 nuclear power reactors in operation in 31 countries around the world, and 62 nuclear power reactors under construction.

Most nuclear power plants use thermal reactors with enriched uranium in a once-through fuel cycle. Fuel is removed when the percentage of neutron absorbing atoms becomes so large that a chain reaction can no longer be sustained, typically three years. It is then cooled for several years in on-site spent fuel pools before being transferred to long-term storage. The spent fuel, though low in volume, is high-level radioactive waste. While its radioactivity decreases exponentially, it must be isolated from the biosphere for hundreds of thousands of years, though newer technologies (like fast reactors) have the potential to significantly reduce this. Because the spent fuel is still mostly fissionable material, some countries (e.g. France and Russia) reprocess their spent fuel by extracting fissile and fertile elements for fabrication into new fuel, although this process is more expensive than producing new fuel from mined uranium. All reactors breed some plutonium-239, which is found in the spent fuel, and because Pu-239 is the preferred material for nuclear weapons, reprocessing is seen as a weapon proliferation risk.

Building a nuclear power plant often spans five to ten years, which can accrue significant financial costs, depending on how the initial investments are financed. Because of this high construction cost and lower operations, maintenance, and fuel costs, nuclear plants are usually used for base load generation, because this maximizes the hours over which the fixed cost of construction can be amortized.

Nuclear power plants have a carbon footprint comparable to that of renewable energy such as solar farms and wind farms, and much lower than fossil fuels such as natural gas and coal. Nuclear power plants are among the safest modes of electricity generation, comparable to solar and wind power plants in terms of deaths from accidents and air pollution per terawatt-hour of electricity.

== History ==
The first time that heat from a nuclear reactor was used to generate electricity was on 21 December 1951, at the Experimental Breeder Reactor I, powering four light bulbs.

On 27 June 1954, the world's first nuclear power station to generate electricity for a power grid, the Obninsk Nuclear Power Plant, commenced operations in Obninsk, in the Soviet Union. The world's first full scale power station, Calder Hall in the United Kingdom, opened on 17 October 1956 and was also meant to produce plutonium. The world's first full scale power station solely devoted to electricity production was the Shippingport Atomic Power Station in Pennsylvania, United States, which was connected to the grid on 18 December 1957.

== Basic components ==
Fuel handling
Radioactive waste system
Refueling floor
Spent fuel pool
Online refueling machine(s) in some designs such as RBMK and CANDU

Power generation
Condenser
Cooling tower
Electrical generator
Steam turbine

Reactor assembly
Control rod drives
Instrumentation such as ion chambers
Control rods
Coolant
Neutron howitzer
Neutron moderator
Neutron poison
Nuclear fuel
Nuclear reactor core
Reactor pressure vessel (In most reactors)
Startup neutron source

Safety systems
Containment building
Emergency core cooling system
Emergency power system
Essential service water system
Reactor protection system
Standby liquid control system

Steam generation
Boiler feedwater pump
Steam generators (in PWR reactors, which also have pressurizers)

=== Systems ===
Boiling water reactor (BWR)

The conversion to electrical energy takes place indirectly, as in conventional thermal power stations. The fission in a nuclear reactor heats the reactor coolant. The coolant may be water or gas, or even liquid metal, depending on the type of reactor. The reactor coolant then goes to a steam generator and heats water to produce steam (in the case of pressurized water reactors, PWRs), or may be converted to steam directly in the reactor (in the case of boiling water reactors, BWRs). The pressurized steam is then usually fed to a multi-stage steam turbine. After the steam turbine has expanded and partially condensed the steam, the remaining vapor is condensed in a condenser. The condenser is a heat exchanger which is connected to a secondary side such as a river or a cooling tower. The water is then pumped back into the steam generator and the cycle begins again. The water-steam cycle corresponds to the Rankine cycle.

The nuclear reactor is the heart of the station. In its central part, the reactor's core produces heat due to nuclear fission. With this heat, a coolant is heated as it is pumped through the reactor and thereby removes the energy from the reactor. The heat from nuclear fission is used to raise steam, which runs through turbines, which in turn power the electrical generators.

Nuclear reactors usually rely on uranium to fuel the chain reaction. Uranium is a very heavy metal that is abundant on Earth and is found in sea water as well as most rocks. Naturally occurring uranium is found in two different isotopes: uranium-238 (U-238), accounting for 99.3% and uranium-235 (U-235) accounting for about 0.7%. U-238 has 146 neutrons and U-235 has 143 neutrons.

Different isotopes have different behaviors. For instance, U-235 is fissile which means that it is easily split and gives off a lot of energy making it ideal for nuclear energy. On the other hand, U-238 does not have that property despite it being the same element. Different isotopes also have different half-lives. U-238 has a longer half-life than U-235, so it takes longer to decay over time. This also means that U-238 is less radioactive than U-235.

Since nuclear fission creates radioactivity, the reactor core is surrounded by a protective shield. This containment absorbs radiation and prevents radioactive material from being released into the environment. In addition, many reactors are equipped with a dome of concrete to protect the reactor against both internal casualties and external impacts.

Pressurized water reactor (PWR)

The purpose of the steam turbine is to convert the heat contained in steam into mechanical energy. The engine house with the steam turbine is usually structurally separated from the main reactor building. It is aligned so as to prevent debris from the destruction of a turbine in operation from flying towards the reactor and important safety systems.

In the case of a pressurized water reactor, the steam turbine is separated from the nuclear system. To detect a leak in the steam generator and thus the passage of radioactive water at an early stage, an activity meter is mounted to track the outlet steam of the steam generator. In contrast, boiling water reactors pass radioactive water through the steam turbine, so the turbine is kept as part of the radiologically controlled area of the nuclear power station.

The electric generator converts mechanical power supplied by the turbine into electrical power. Low-pole AC synchronous generators of high rated power are used. A cooling system removes heat from the reactor core and transports it to another area of the station, where the thermal energy can be harnessed to produce electricity or to do other useful work. Typically the hot coolant is used as a heat source for a boiler, and the pressurized steam from that drives one or more steam turbine driven electrical generators.

In the event of an emergency, safety valves can be used to prevent pipes from bursting or the reactor from exploding. The valves are designed so that they will open automatically and maintain pressure under the reactor's safety limits. In the case of the BWR, the steam is directed into the suppression chamber and condenses there. The chambers on a heat exchanger are connected to the intermediate cooling circuit.

The main condenser is a large cross-flow shell and tube heat exchanger that takes wet vapor, a mixture of liquid water and steam at saturation conditions, from the turbine-generator exhaust and condenses it back into sub-cooled liquid water so it can be pumped back to the reactor by the condensate and feedwater pumps.

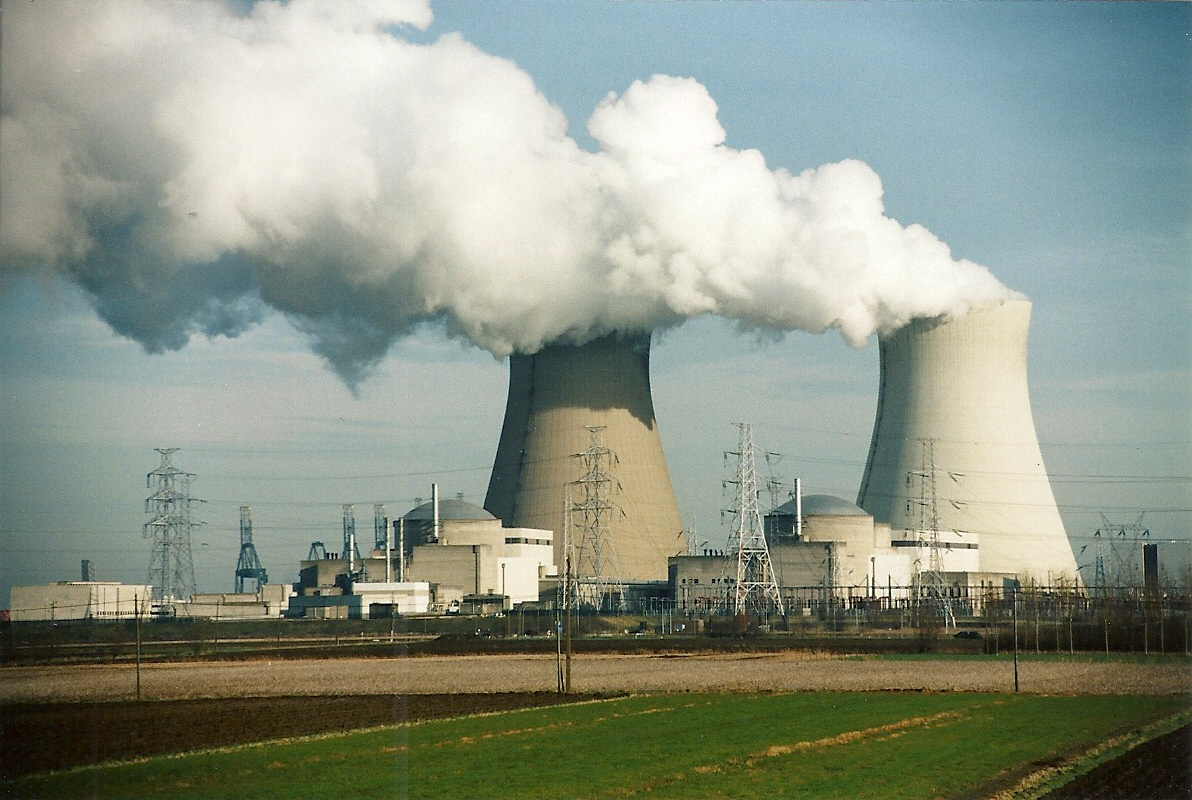
Some nuclear reactors make use of cooling towers to condense the steam exiting the turbines. All steam released is never in contact with radioactivity.

In the main condenser, the wet vapor turbine exhaust come into contact with thousands of tubes that have much colder water flowing through them on the other side. The cooling water typically come from a natural body of water such as a river or lake. Palo Verde Nuclear Generating Station, located in the desert about 97 kilometres (60 mi) west of Phoenix, Arizona, is the only nuclear facility that does not use a natural body of water for cooling, instead using treated sewage from the greater Phoenix metropolitan area. The water coming from the cooling body of water is either pumped back to the water source at a warmer temperature or returns to a cooling tower where it either cools for more uses or evaporates into water vapor that rises out the top of the tower.

The water level in the steam generator and the nuclear reactor is controlled using the feedwater system. The feedwater pump has the task of taking the water from the condensate system, increasing the pressure and forcing it into either the steam generators—in the case of a pressurized water reactor — or directly into the reactor, for boiling water reactors.

Continuous power supply to the plant is critical to ensure safe operation. Most nuclear stations require at least two distinct sources of offsite power for redundancy. These are usually provided by multiple transformers that are sufficiently separated and can receive power from multiple transmission lines. In addition, in some nuclear stations, the turbine generator can power the station's loads while the station is online, without requiring external power. This is achieved via station service transformers which tap power from the generator output before they reach the step-up transformer.

== World operating status ==
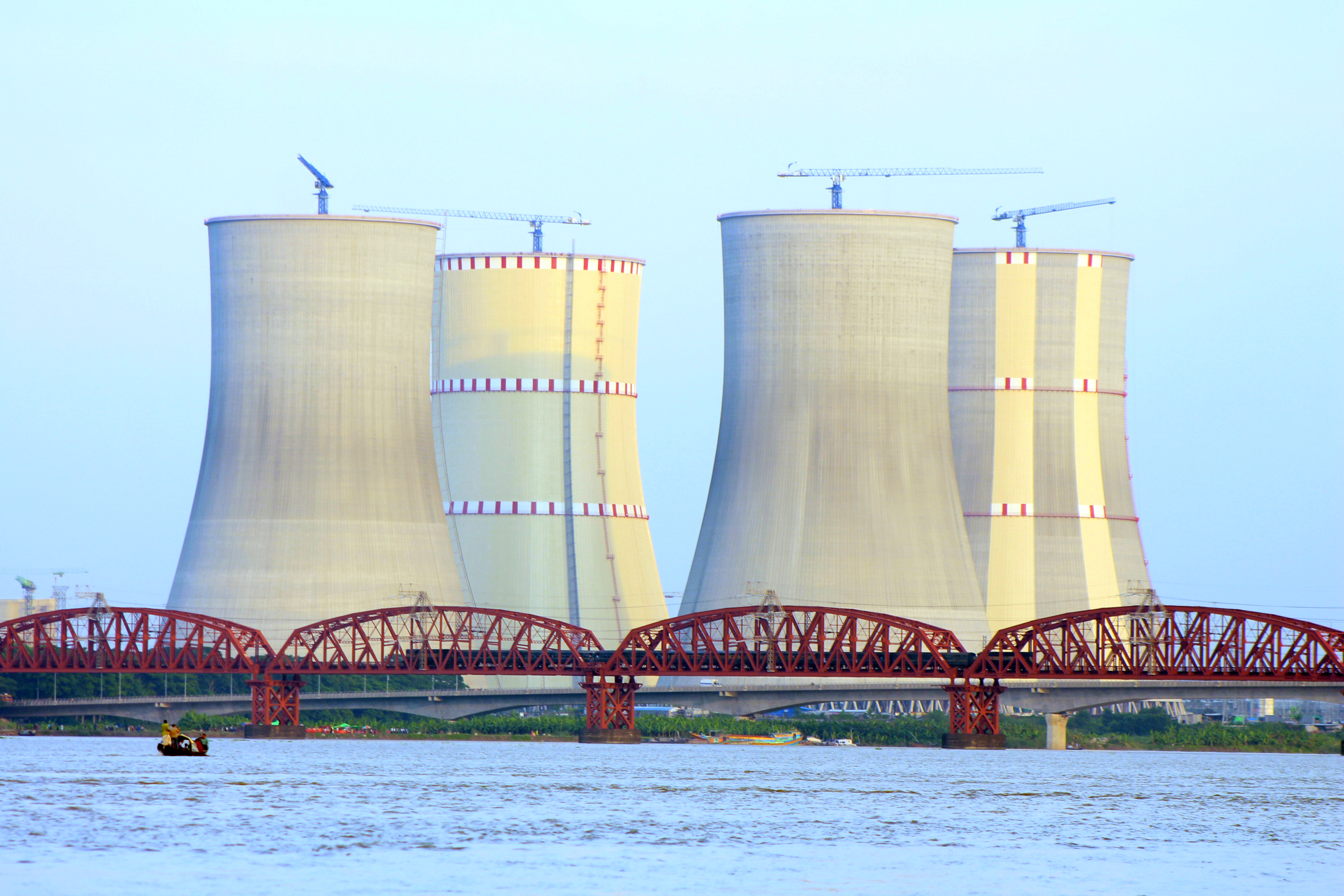
Rooppur Nuclear Power Plant in Bangladesh

Nuclear power plants generate approximately 10% of global electricity, sourced from around 440 reactors worldwide. They are recognized as a significant provider of low-carbon electricity, accounting for about one-quarter of the world's supply in this category. As of 2020, nuclear power stood as the second-largest source of low-carbon energy, making up 26% of the total. Nuclear power facilities are active in 32 countries or regions, and their influence extends beyond these nations through regional transmission grids, especially in Europe.

In 2022, nuclear power plants generated 2545 terawatt-hours (TWh) of electricity, a slight decrease from the 2653 TWh produced in 2021. Thirteen countries generated at least one-quarter of their electricity from nuclear sources. Notably, France relies on nuclear energy for about 70% of its electricity needs, while Ukraine, Slovakia, Belgium, and Hungary source around half their power from nuclear. Japan, which previously depended on nuclear for over a quarter of its electricity, is anticipated to resume similar levels of nuclear energy utilization.

Over the last 15 years, the United States has seen a significant improvement in the operational performance of its nuclear power plants, enhancing their utilization and efficiency, adding the output equivalent to 19 new 1000 MWe reactors without actual construction. In France, nuclear power plants still produce over sixty percent of this country's total power generation in 2022. While a previous goal aimed to reduce nuclear electricity generation share to lower than fifty percent by 2025, this target was postponed to 2035 in 2019 and ultimately discarded in 2023. Russia continues to export the most nuclear power plants in the world, with projects across various countries: as of July 2023, Russia was constructing 19 out of 22 reactors constructed by foreign vendors; however, some exporting projects were canceled due to the Russian invasion of Ukraine. Meanwhile, China continues to advance in nuclear energy: having 25 reactors under construction by late 2023, China is the country with the most reactors being built at one time in the world.

=== Decommissioning ===
Nuclear decommissioning is the dismantling of a nuclear power station and decontamination of the site to a state no longer requiring protection from radiation for the general public. The main difference from the dismantling of other power stations is the presence of radioactive material that requires special precautions to remove and safely relocate to a waste repository.

Decommissioning involves many administrative and technical actions. It includes all clean-up of radioactivity and progressive demolition of the station. Once a facility is decommissioned, there should no longer be any danger of a radioactive accident or to any persons visiting it. After a facility has been completely decommissioned it is released from regulatory control, and the licensee of the station no longer has responsibility for its nuclear safety.

==== Timing and deferral of decommissioning ====
Generally speaking, nuclear stations were originally designed for a life of about 30 years. Newer stations are designed for a 40 to 60-year operating life. The Centurion Reactor is a future class of nuclear reactor that is being designed to last 100 years.

One of the major limiting wear factors is the deterioration of the reactor's pressure vessel under the action of neutron bombardment, however in 2018 Rosatom announced it had developed a thermal annealing technique for reactor pressure vessels which ameliorates radiation damage and extends service life by between 15 and 30 years.

=== Flexibility ===
Nuclear stations are used primarily for base load because of economic considerations. The fuel cost of operations for a nuclear station is smaller than the fuel cost for operation of coal or gas plants. Since most of the cost of nuclear power plants is capital cost, there is almost no cost saved by running it at less than full capacity.

Nuclear power plants are routinely used in load following mode on a large scale in France, although "it is generally accepted that this is not an ideal economic situation for nuclear stations". Unit A at the now decommissioned German Biblis Nuclear Power Plant was designed to modulate its output 15% per minute between 40% and 100% of its nominal power.

Russia has led in the practical development of floating nuclear power stations, which can be transported to the desired location and occasionally relocated or moved for easier decommissioning. In 2022, the United States Department of Energy funded a three-year research study of offshore floating nuclear power generation. In October 2022, NuScale Power and Canadian company Prodigy announced a joint project to bring a North American small modular reactor based floating plant to market.

== Economics ==
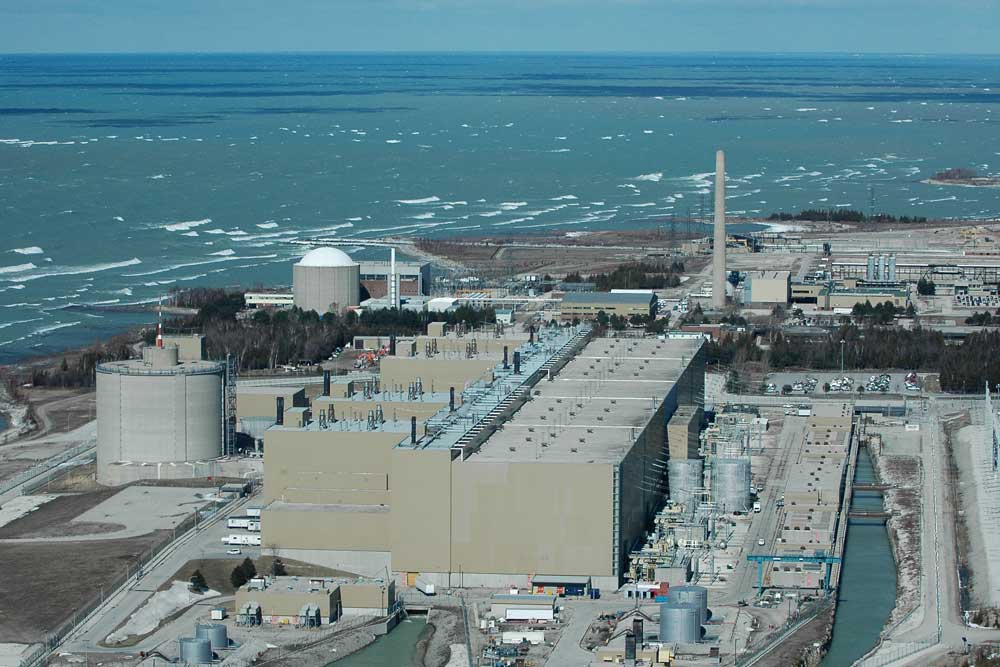
Bruce Nuclear Generating Station (Canada), one of the largest operational nuclear power facilities in the world.

Nuclear power stations typically have high capital costs, but low direct fuel costs, with the costs of fuel extraction, processing, use and spent fuel storage internalized costs. Therefore, comparison with other power generation methods is strongly dependent on assumptions about construction timescales and capital financing for nuclear stations. Cost estimates take into account station decommissioning and nuclear waste storage or recycling costs.

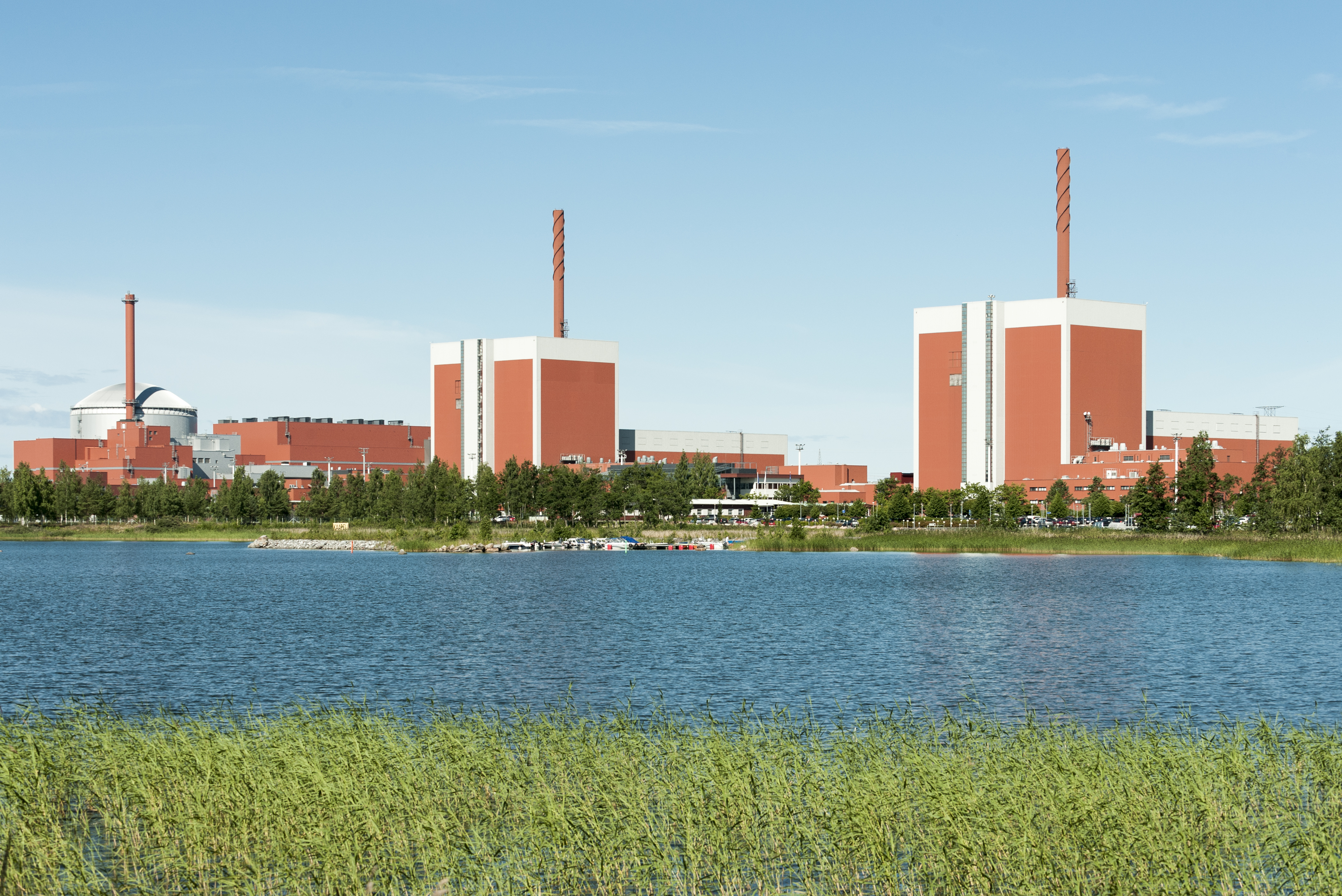
Olkiluoto Nuclear Power Plant in Eurajoki, Finland. The site houses of one of the most powerful reactors known as EPR.

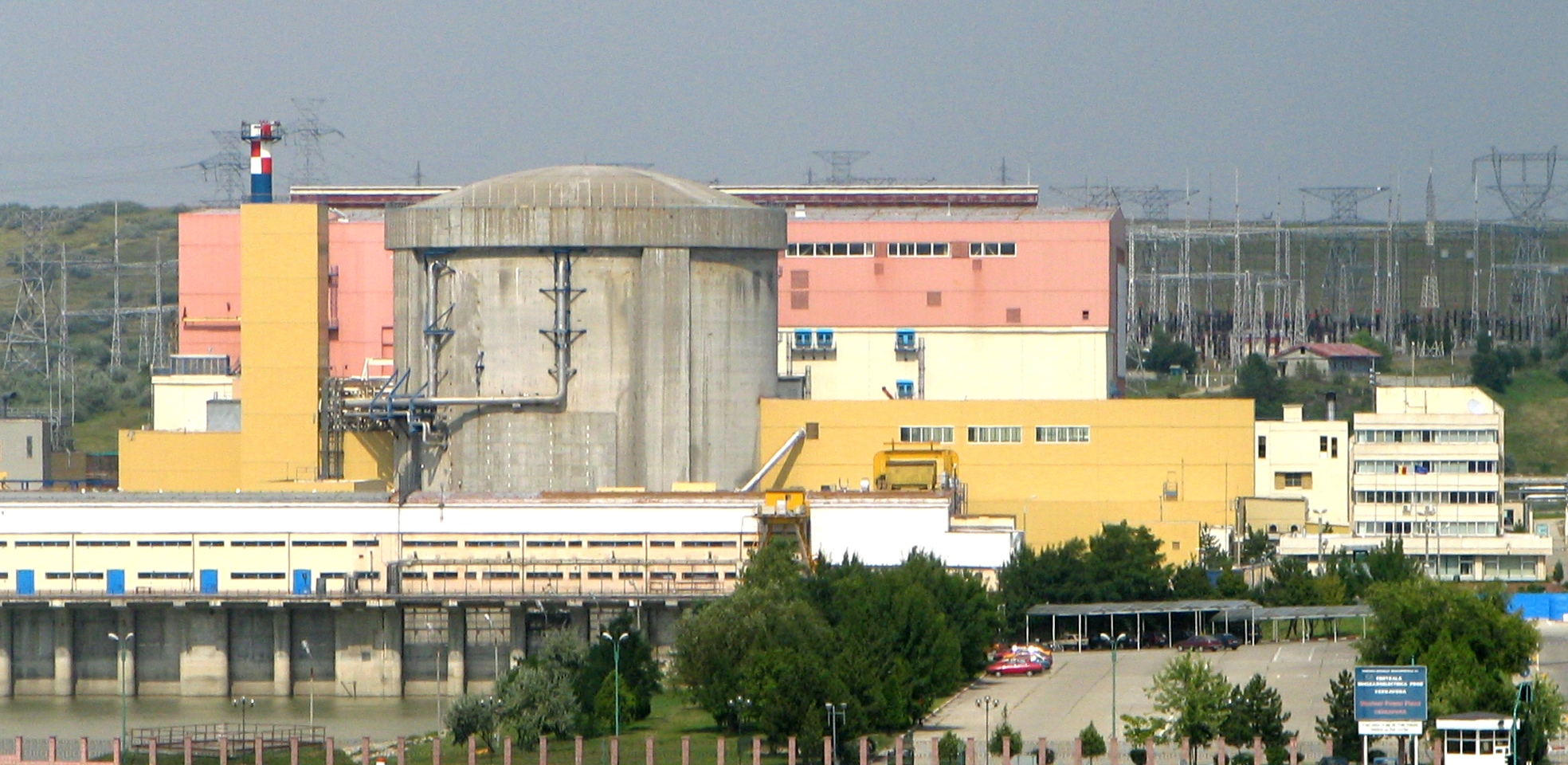
Unit 1 of the Cernavodă Nuclear Power Plant in Romania

Analysis of the economics of nuclear power must take into account who bears the risks of future uncertainties. To date all operating nuclear power stations were developed by state-owned or regulated utilities where many of the risks associated with construction costs, operating performance, fuel price, and other factors were borne by consumers rather than suppliers. Many countries have now liberalized the electricity market where these risks and the risk of cheaper competitors emerging before capital costs are recovered, are borne by station suppliers and operators rather than consumers, which leads to a significantly different evaluation of the economics of new nuclear power stations. Where cheap gas is available and its future supply relatively secure, this also poses a major problem for nuclear projects.

== Safety and security ==
Hypothetical number of global deaths which would have resulted from energy production if the world's energy production was met through a single source, in 2014.

Modern nuclear reactor designs have had numerous safety improvements since the first-generation nuclear reactors. A nuclear power plant cannot explode like a nuclear weapon because the fuel for uranium reactors is not enriched enough, and nuclear weapons require precision explosives to force nuclear material into a small enough volume to become supercritical. Most reactors require continuous temperature control to prevent a core meltdown, which has occurred on a few occasions through accident or natural disaster, releasing radiation and making the surrounding area uninhabitable. Plants must be defended against theft of nuclear material and attack by enemy military planes or missiles.

The most serious accidents to date have been the 1979 Three Mile Island accident, the 1986 Chernobyl disaster, and the 2011 Fukushima Daiichi nuclear disaster, corresponding to the beginning of the operation of generation II reactors.

Professor of sociology Charles Perrow states that multiple and unexpected failures are built into society's complex and tightly coupled nuclear reactor systems. Such accidents are unavoidable and cannot be designed around. An interdisciplinary team from MIT has estimated that given the expected growth of nuclear power from 2005 to 2055, at least four serious nuclear accidents would be expected in that period. The MIT study does not take into account improvements in safety since 1970.

== Regulation and oversight ==
Nuclear power works under an insurance framework that limits or structures accident liabilities in accordance with the Paris Convention on Third Party Liability in the Field of Nuclear Energy, the Brussels supplementary convention, and the Vienna Convention on Civil Liability for Nuclear Damage. However states with a majority of the world's nuclear power stations, including the U.S., Russia, China and Japan, are not party to international nuclear liability conventions.

United States
In the United States, insurance for nuclear or radiological incidents is covered (for facilities licensed through 2025) by the Price-Anderson Nuclear Industries Indemnity Act.

United Kingdom
Under the energy policy of the United Kingdom through its 1965 Nuclear Installations Act, liability is governed for nuclear damage for which a UK nuclear licensee is responsible. The Act requires compensation to be paid for damage up to a limit of £150 million by the liable operator for ten years after the incident. Between ten and thirty years afterwards, the Government meets this obligation. The Government is also liable for additional limited cross-border liability (about £300 million) under international conventions (Paris Convention on Third Party Liability in the Field of Nuclear Energy and Brussels Convention supplementary to the Paris Convention).

== Controversy ==
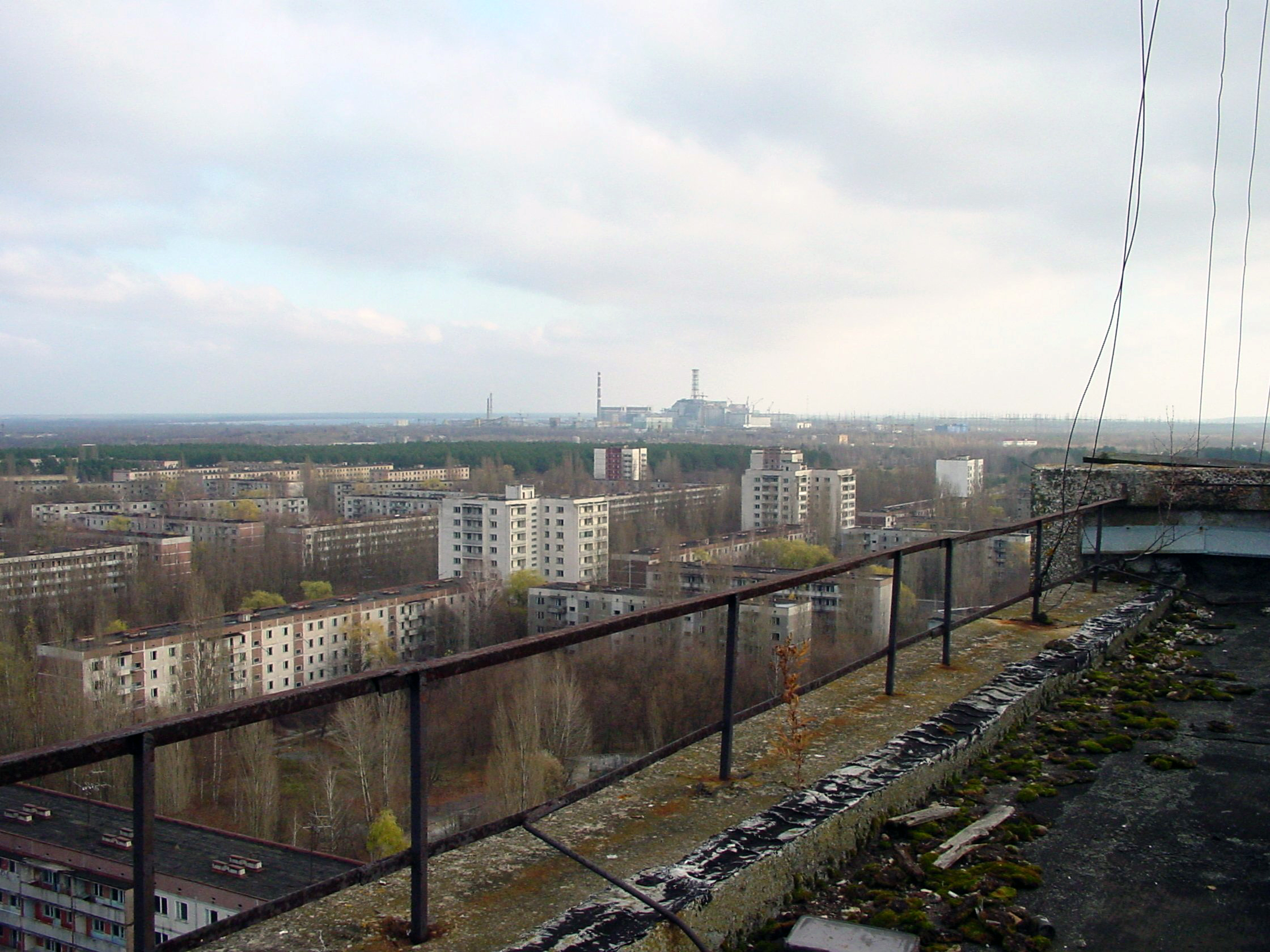
The Ukrainian city of Pripyat abandoned due to a nuclear accident, which took place at Chernobyl Nuclear Power Plant on 26 April 1986, seen in the background.

The nuclear power debate about the deployment and use of nuclear fission reactors to generate electricity from nuclear fuel for civilian purposes peaked during the 1970s and 1980s, when it "reached an intensity unprecedented in the history of technology controversies," in some countries.

Proponents argue that nuclear power is a sustainable energy source which reduces carbon emissions and can increase energy security if its use supplants a dependence on imported fuels. Proponents advance the notion that nuclear power produces virtually no air pollution, in contrast to the chief viable alternative of fossil fuel. Proponents also believe that nuclear power is the only viable course to achieve energy independence for most Western countries. They emphasize that the risks of storing waste are small and can be further reduced by using the latest technology in newer reactors, and the operational safety record in the Western world is excellent when compared to the other major kinds of power plants.

Opponents say that nuclear power poses many threats to people and the environment, and that costs do not justify benefits. Threats include health risks and environmental damage from uranium mining, processing and transport, the risk of nuclear weapons proliferation or sabotage, and the problem of radioactive nuclear waste. Another environmental issue from many plants is discharge of hot water into bodies of water. The hot water modifies the environmental conditions for marine flora and fauna. They also contend that reactors themselves are enormously complex machines where many things can and do go wrong, and there have been many serious nuclear accidents.

Opponents argue that when all the energy-intensive stages of the nuclear fuel chain are considered, from uranium mining to nuclear decommissioning, nuclear power is not a low-carbon electricity source despite the possibility of refinement and long-term storage being powered by a nuclear facility. Those countries that do not contain uranium mines cannot achieve energy independence through existing nuclear power technologies. Actual construction costs often exceed estimates, and spent fuel management costs are difficult to define.

On 1 August 2020, the UAE launched the Arab region's first-ever nuclear energy plant. Unit 1 of the Barakah plant in the Al Dhafrah region of Abu Dhabi commenced generating heat on the first day of its launch, while the remaining 3 Units are being built. However, Nuclear Consulting Group head, Paul Dorfman, warned the Gulf nation's investment into the plant as a risk "further destabilizing the volatile Gulf region, damaging the environment and raising the possibility of nuclear proliferation."

== Environmental impact ==
Nuclear power plants do not produce greenhouse gases during operation. Older nuclear power plants, like ones using second-generation reactors, produce approximately the same amount of carbon dioxide during the whole life cycle of nuclear power plants for an average of about 11g/kWh, as much power generated by wind, which is about 1/3 of solar and 1/45 of natural gas and 1/75 of coal. Newer models, like HPR1000, produce even less carbon dioxide during the whole operating life, as little as 1/8 of power plants using gen II reactors for 1.31g/kWh.

However, there are other environmental impacts for nuclear power plants, such as radioactive waste, ionizing radiation, and waste heat. Large-scale atomic power plants might emit waste heat into natural bodies of water, affecting waterborne organisms. Mining nuclear fuel, including uranium or thorium, might negatively influence the environment near the mining site. Although the current method of disposing of nuclear waste from nuclear power plants in deep burials is generally considered safe, accidents during the transportation of nuclear waste can still result in the leakage of nuclear contaminants.

Large-scale nuclear accidents, like Chernobyl or Fukushima, release large quantities of radioactive material into nature, harming creatures and people. Solutions include enhanced regulatory and operational training, reducing radioactivity to surface organisms by deep burial or other treatment of radioactive contaminants at the accident site and creating permanent exclusion zones.

== Future development ==
=== Ongoing projects ===
As for March 2024, there are approximately 60 nuclear reactors for power plants being built worldwide, with a total capacity of 64 GW, with an additional 110 in the planning stages. The majority of these reactors, either under construction or planned, are located in Asia. In recent years, the commissioning of new reactors has been roughly offset by the decommissioning of older ones. Over the last two decades, while 100 reactors began operations, 107 were retired.

As of 2026, there are approximately 80 nuclear reactors under construction worldwide across 15 countries, representing a total capacity of roughly 80 GW, with an additional 120 reactors in the planning stages. The vast majority of these new construction projects remain heavily concentrated in Asia, led extensively by China, which accounts for a substantial share of global construction starts (such as multiple units initiated through 2025 and ongoing approvals in 2026). Other nations are also building their first commercial nuclear power plants.

=== Next generation nuclear power plant ===
An international coalition is advancing research and development on six Generation IV nuclear reactor technologies. The Generation IV International Forum (GIF), initiated by the US Department of Energy in 2000 and formally established in 2001, is a collaborative platform for 13 countries where nuclear energy is significant or crucial for future energy needs. This collective, which includes founding members like Argentina, Brazil, Canada, France, Japan, South Korea, South Africa, the UK, and the USA, along with newer members like Switzerland, China, Russia, Australia, and the European Union through Euratom, focuses on sharing research and development insights rather than constructing reactors, aiming to set multinational regulatory standards for these next-generation nuclear technologies.

In 2002, GIF selected six reactor technologies after two years of reviewing about 100 concepts, representing the future of nuclear energy. Among these six designs, three of them are fast neutron reactors, all operating at higher temperatures than current models. These reactors are designed to be more sustainable, economical, safe, and reliable, and also to resist nuclear proliferation. Four designs have been thoroughly tested in design aspects, providing a basis for further research and potential commercial operation before 2030.

The world's first and only nuclear power plant that put Gen IV reactors into commercial use is Shidao Bay Nuclear Power Plant. The reactor is a high-temperature gas-cooled reactor, started its building process on 21 September 2014, started to generate power 20 December 2021, and was put into commercial operation in 12 December 2023.

=== Fusion power plant ===
Another developing direction for nuclear power plants is nuclear fusion. Nuclear fusion and plasma physics research has made significant strides, with over 50 countries contributing to the field and recently achieving the first-ever scientific energy gain in a fusion experiment. Various designs and methodologies are being explored, including magnet-based machines like stellarators and tokamaks, as well as laser, linear device, and advanced fuel approaches; the timeline for the successful deployment of fusion energy hinges on global collaboration, the pace of industry development, and the establishment of the necessary nuclear infrastructure to support this future energy source.

The assembly of ITER, the largest international fusion facility, began in 2020 in France, marking a crucial step toward demonstrating fusion energy's viability. With experiments set to start in the latter half of this decade and full-power experiments slated for 2036, ITER aims to pave the way for DEMO power plants, which experts believe could be operational by 2050. Concurrently, private ventures are leveraging decades of publicly funded research to advance fusion technology, suggesting that commercial fusion power could become a reality even before the mid-21st century. Many countries involving the ITER project are also developing their own fusion reactor and power plants models. In China, researchers are developing a new reactor called China Fusion Engineering Test Reactor (CFETR) aimed to build a commercial practical fusion power plant by 2050.

== See also ==
- List of commercial nuclear reactors
- List of nuclear power stations
