= Jan Gunneweg =

Jan Gunneweg was born in Schiedam in the Netherlands in 1939 on March 2. He is a member of the Archaeometry Task-force Unit at the Institute of Archaeology of the Humanities Faculty of the Hebrew University, Jerusalem. He began research at the university in 1973 completing his Ph.D. in the Archaeometry Unit of the institution in 1981. He became a lecturer in 1983, and senior lecturer in 1988.

His major research interest is in discovering the place of manufacture of pottery and parchment through the use of neutron activation analysis and synchrotron radiation. He has been particularly interested in finding the place of origin of the Dead Sea Scrolls and the jars that contained them in Gunneweg and Balla 2003, 2006,2010 & 2012 in. Other interests include research into the ancient preparation of parchment and ink as used in the Dead Sea scrolls. Gunneweg organized three workshops, two at the Hebrew University Science Campus in 2005 and 2010, and the third in 2008 at the Lorentz Centre for Physics and Mathematics at Leiden University (Netherlands) as a NIAS and Lorentz fellow for 2007-2008.

During two Sabbaticals in 1989 and 1996 at Lawrence Berkeley National Laboratory In Berkeley, California, he worked on the digitizing of neutron activation data obtained at LBL in the 1960s and 70s. More research was focused on the place of origin of Iron Age pottery associated with the first Iron Age settlements in the Israel highlands, the Philistines and the Mycenaean IA Chariot Krater and other Mycenaean pottery, found at Akko and Tel Dan. Also, the origin of Nabatean and Eastern Terra Sigillata pottery have been studied and published
