= Refueling floor =

Overview of the nuclear power plant refuelling floor and its operations

The nuclear power plant refueling floor is a specialized area within a nuclear power plant dedicated to the handling, replacement, and management of nuclear fuel assemblies during scheduled refuelling outages. This area is critical to reactor safety and efficiency, as it enables the controlled exchange of spent fuel for fresh fuel assemblies.

== Design and Location ==
The refuelling floor is generally located within the reactor building and is positioned above the reactor vessel to allow direct access to the reactor core during outages. Its design varies with the type of reactor installed.

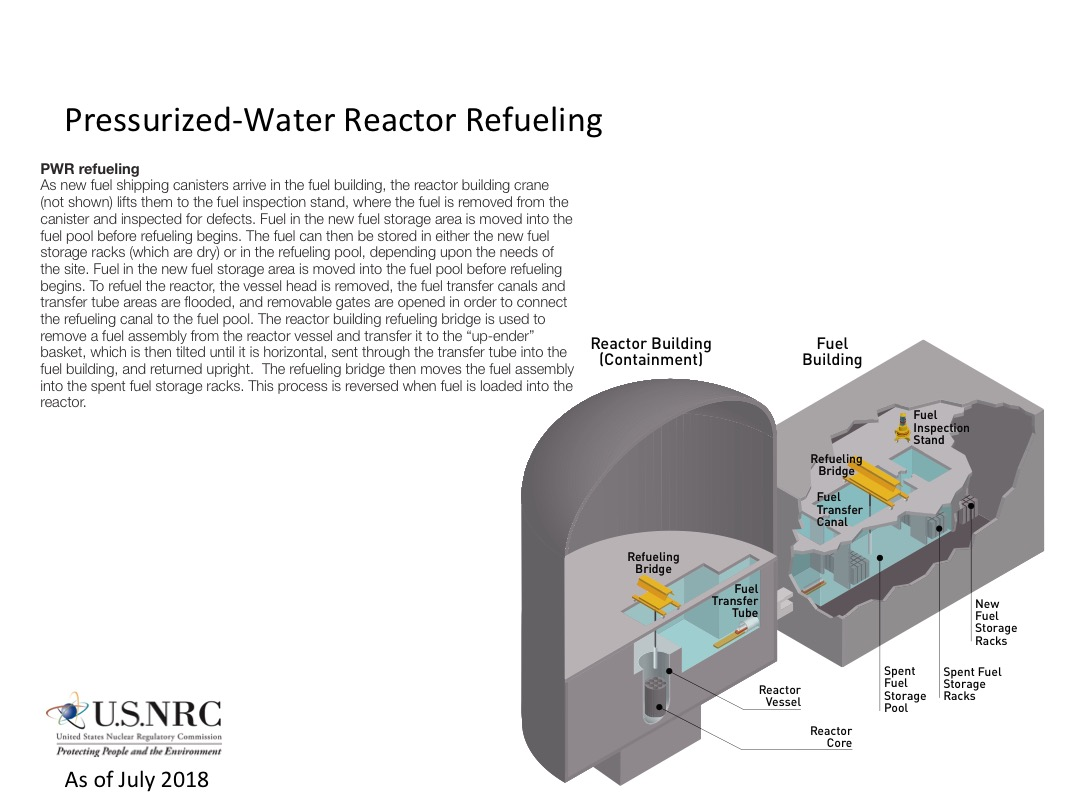
PWR Refueling Process

=== Pressurized Water Reactors (PWRs) ===
In Pressurized Water Reactors, the refuelling floor is equipped with heavy lifting equipment such as reactor building cranes. These cranes transport fuel shipping casks onto the refuelling floor, where new fuel assemblies are unloaded and prepared for insertion into the reactor core. Detailed information on PWR refuelling procedures is provided by the Nuclear Regulatory Commission.

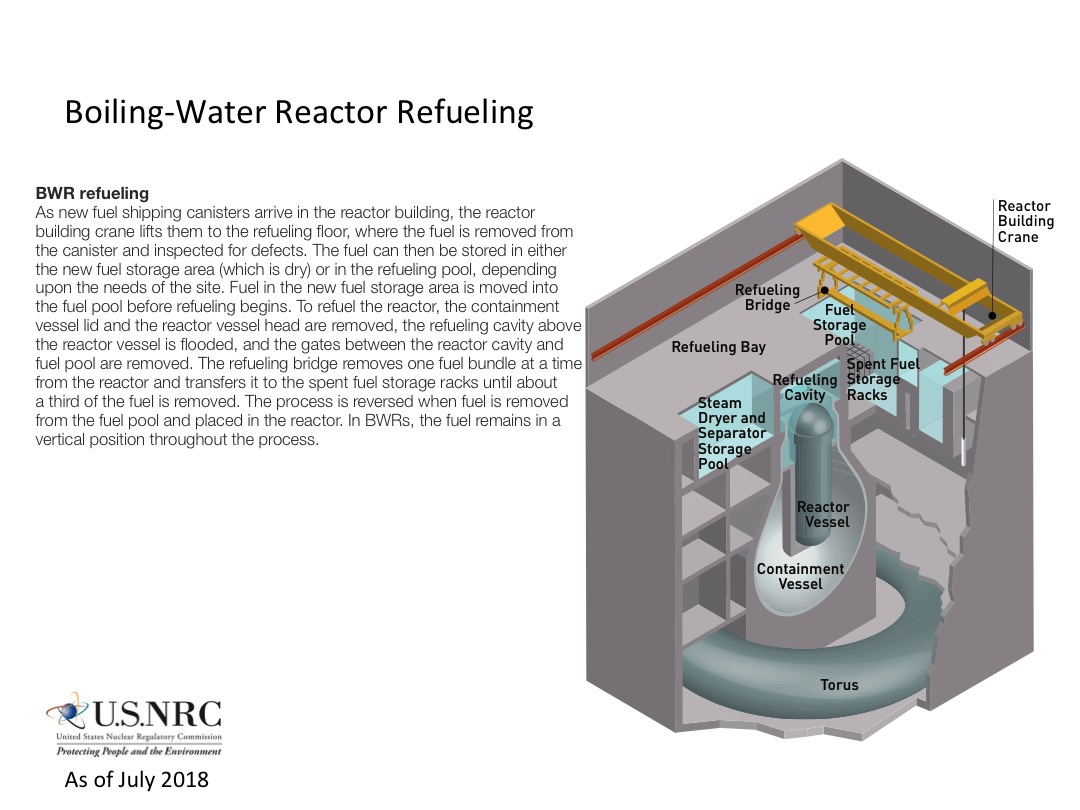
BWR Refueling Process

=== Boiling Water Reactors (BWRs) ===
In Boiling Water Reactors, the refuelling floor typically incorporates a flooded reactor well to facilitate the safe movement of fuel assemblies. In addition, storage pools and containment systems are used to manage both fuel assemblies and reactor hardware during the refuelling process. More information on BWR operations is available from the NRC.

== Key Components ==
A PWR Power Plant with Fuel Storage (9) and a Refueling Machine (10)

The refuelling floor incorporates several critical components to support safe and efficient operations:

- Spent fuel pool: A deep pool of water that provides cooling and radiation shielding for spent fuel assemblies awaiting further handling. The NRC offers guidelines on spent fuel storage.
- Fuel Handling Equipment: Specialized machinery—including cranes, robotic arms, and transfer systems—that safely moves fuel assemblies between the reactor core, storage pools, and transportation casks.
- Storage Racks: Structures within the spent fuel pool that securely organize fuel assemblies, maintaining appropriate spacing to prevent criticality concerns.

== Refuelling Process ==
During a scheduled refuelling outage, typically occurring every 18 to 24 months, the following steps are undertaken on the refuelling floor:

1. Reactor Cooldown: The reactor is cooled and depressurized to create a safe environment for fuel handling.
2. Reactor Disassembly: Removal of components, such as the reactor vessel head, to allow access to the core.
3. Fuel Removal: Extraction of spent fuel assemblies from the core using specialized handling equipment, followed by their transfer to the spent fuel pool.
4. Inspection and Maintenance: With the reactor core accessible, thorough inspections and maintenance procedures are conducted on reactor internals.
5. Fuel Loading: Installation of fresh fuel assemblies into the reactor core in a carefully planned pattern to optimize reactor performance.
6. Reactor Reassembly: Reassembly of reactor components, system testing, and restart of the reactor to resume power generation.

== Safety Considerations ==
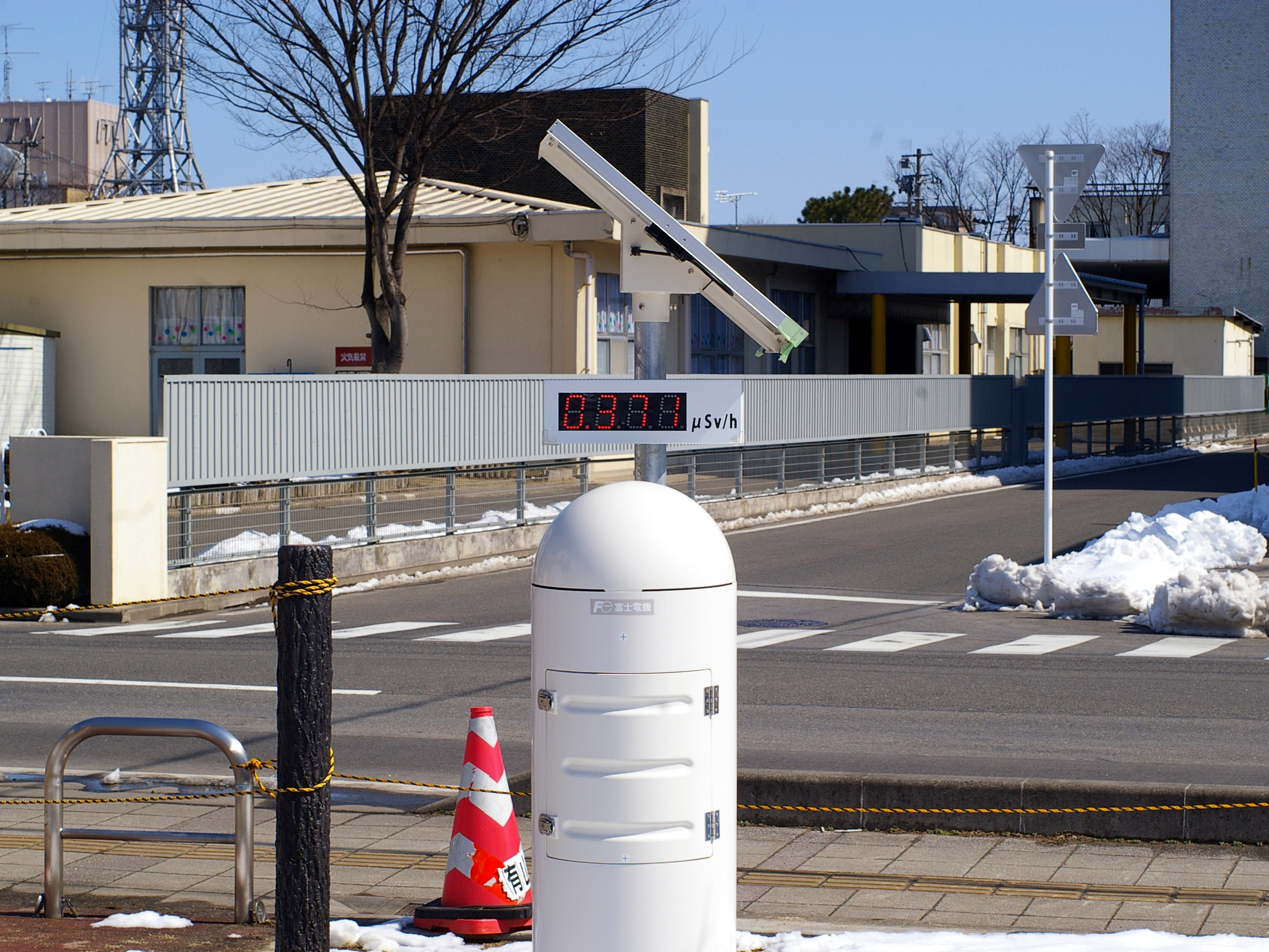
Radiation monitoring in Fukushima

Due to high radiation levels and the use of heavy equipment, safety on the refuelling floor is paramount. Nuclear facilities employ rigorous protocols that include:

- The use of remote handling systems to minimize personnel exposure.
- Continuous radiation monitoring and strict contamination controls.
- Robust physical barriers and containment measures to protect both workers and the environment.

== See also ==
- Nuclear reactor
- Nuclear power
- Spent fuel pool
- Nuclear safety
- Refueling
