= Refueling =

Refueling or Refuelling may refer to:

- Filling station, for refueling motor vehicles
- Refueling and Overhaul in the United States Navy
- Reactor refueling
- Aerial refueling
- Bunkering, the refueling of ships
- Refueling aircraft at airports
- Pit stop refueling in motorsport

== See also ==
- Nuclear reprocessing
- Spent nuclear fuel
