= Neutron howitzer =

Single directional neutron source

A neutron howitzer is a neutron source that emits neutrons in a single direction. It was discovered in the 1930s that alpha radiation that strikes the beryllium nucleus would release neutrons. The high speed of the alpha is sufficient to overcome the relatively low Coulomb barrier of the beryllium nucleus, the repulsive force due to the positive charge of the nucleus, which contains only four protons, allowing for fusion of the two particles, releasing energetic neutrons.

In 1930 Walther Bothe and Herbert Becker in Germany found that alpha particles striking light elements such as beryllium, boron, or lithium would release a highly penetrating radiation, at first believed to be gamma radiation, although it was more penetrating than any gamma rays known. The next important contribution was reported in 1932 by Irène Joliot-Curie and Frédéric Joliot in Paris, who showed that if this unknown radiation fell on paraffin wax or any other hydrogen-containing compound it ejected protons of very high energy. Finally, in 1932 the physicist James Chadwick in England performed a series of experiments showing that the gamma ray hypothesis was untenable, and suggested that the new radiation consisted of uncharged particles of approximately the mass of the proton. He performed a series of experiments to verify this, these uncharged particles were eventually called "neutrons", and Chadwick is credited with this discovery.

Any alpha-emitting radioisotope will suffice, but usually a high specific activity alpha-emitter is chosen. Historically a variety of isotopes such as radium (Ra-226) were used, but in modern times the transuranic isotopes Am-241 and Pu-239 are almost exclusively used in AmBe and PuBe neutron sources, respectively. The alpha emitter and the beryllium are pulverized and mixed together in close intimate contact to ensure a high percentage of alpha-emitter and beryllium nuclei in close contact, since the alpha particle has a very short range through material, and would lose energy preventing reaction if sufficiently far away. This mixture of material is then packed into a suitable carrier with radiation shielding, with one end open to allow the neutrons to shoot out in the direction of the open end, thus acting like a howitzer.

Neutron howitzers were used by Otto Hahn, Fritz Strassman, and Lise Meitner in 1938 to bombard uranium nuclei with neutrons in the hopes of making transuranic elements. To their surprise, they found barium residue, a clear indication that they had instead fissioned uranium nuclei. This discovery led to the development of the first nuclear reactor in 1942, and ultimately nuclear weapons in 1945.
